= Prisoner of war =

Military term for a captive of the enemy

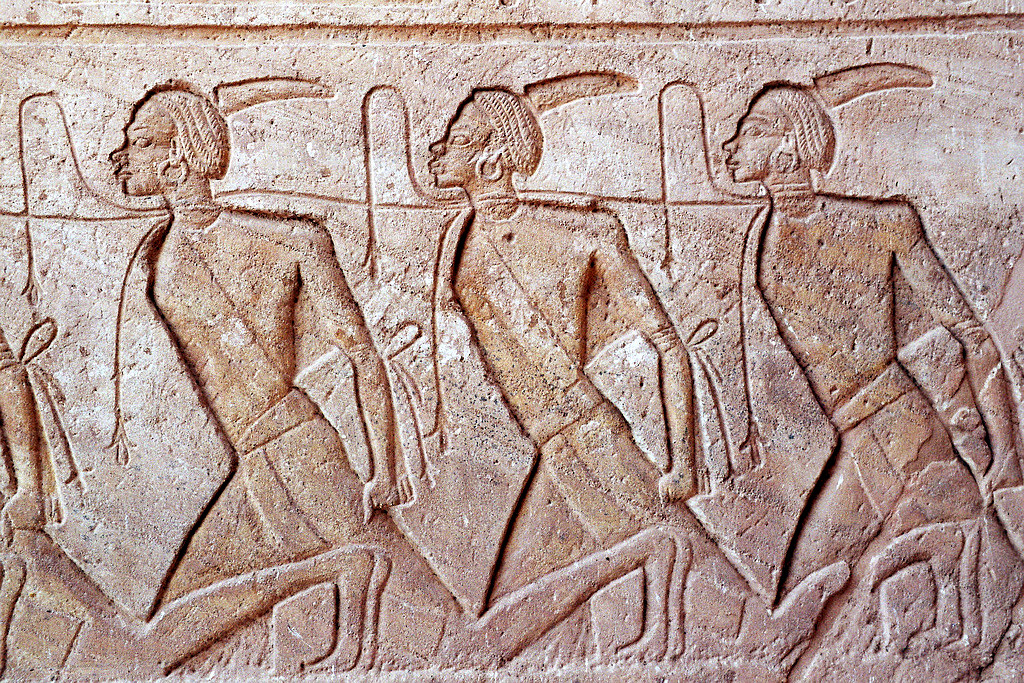
Engraving of Kushite prisoners, Abu Simbel, Egypt, 13th century BC

A prisoner of war (POW) is a person held captive by a belligerent power during or immediately after an armed conflict. The earliest recorded usage of the phrase "prisoner of war" dates back to 1610. (Note: Compare Harper, Douglas. "prisoner". Online Etymology Dictionary. – "Captives taken in war have been called prisoners since mid-14c.; phrase prisoner of war dates from 1630s".)

Belligerents hold prisoners of war for a range of reasons. These may include isolating them from enemy combatants still in the field (releasing and repatriating them in an orderly manner after hostilities), demonstrating military victory, punishment, prosecution of war crimes, labour exploitation, recruiting or even conscripting them as combatants, extracting or collecting military and political intelligence, and political or religious indoctrination.

== Ancient times ==
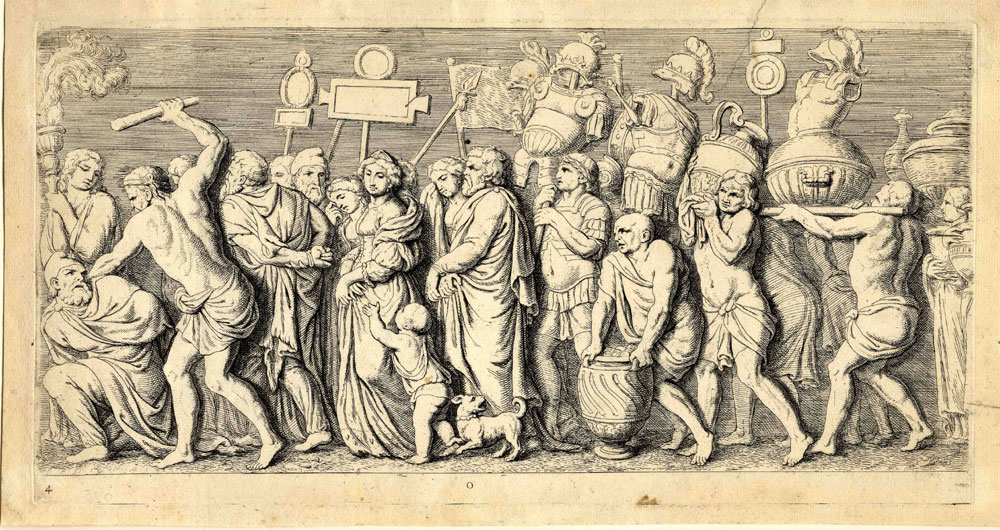
Engraving of prisoners in a Roman Triumph, 19th century

For much of history, prisoners of war would often be slaughtered or enslaved. Early Roman gladiators could be prisoners of war, categorised according to their ethnic roots as Samnites, Thracians, and Gauls (Galli). Homer's Iliad describes Trojan and Greek soldiers offering rewards of wealth to opposing forces who have defeated them on the battlefield in exchange for mercy, but such offers were not always accepted.

Typically, victors made little distinction between enemy combatants and enemy civilians, although they were more likely to spare women and children. Sometimes the purpose of a battle, if not of a war, was to capture women, a practice known as raptio; the Rape of the Sabines involved, according to tradition, a large mass-abduction by the founders of Rome. Typically women had no rights, and were held legally as chattels.

In the fourth century AD, St Acacius of Amida, touched by the plight of Persian prisoners captured in a recent war with the Roman Empire, who were held in his town under appalling conditions and destined for a life of slavery, took the initiative in ransoming them by selling his church's precious gold and silver vessels and letting them return to their country. For this he was later canonised.

== Middle Ages and Renaissance ==
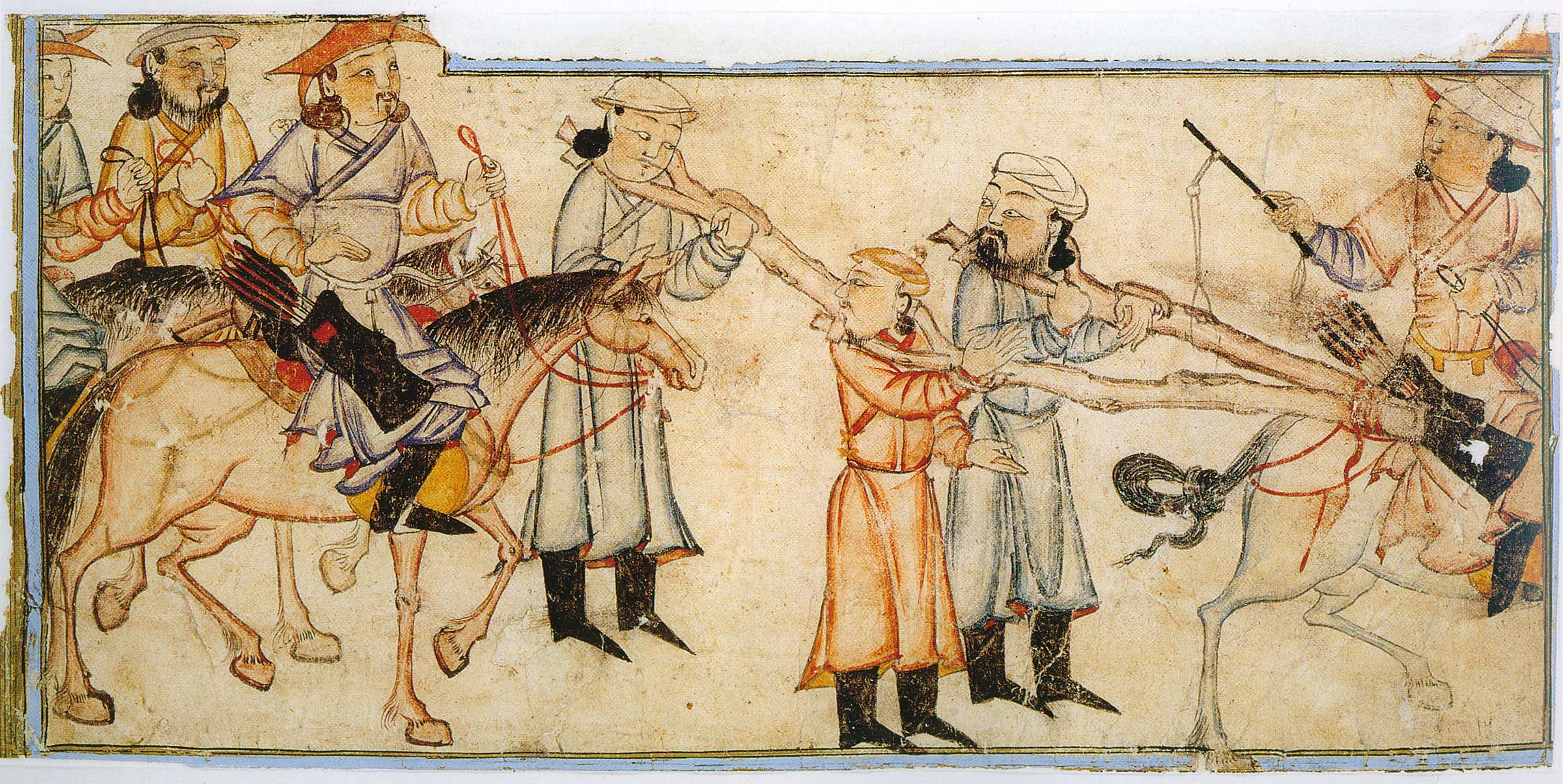
Mongol riders with prisoners, 14th century

According to legend, during Childeric's siege and blockade of Paris in 464 the nun Geneviève (later canonised as the city's patron saint) pleaded with the Frankish king for the welfare of prisoners of war and met with a favourable response. Later, Clovis I (r. 481–511) liberated captives after Genevieve urged him to do so.

King Henry V's English army killed many French prisoners of war at the Battle of Agincourt in 1415. This was done after a French raiding party returned to the main army after looting the English camp, Henry misinterpreted this as the French receiving reinforcements, and was afraid that the prisoners would rejoin the fight against the English.

In the later Middle Ages a number of religious wars aimed to not only defeat but also to eliminate enemies. Authorities in Christian Europe often considered the extermination of heretics and heathens desirable. Examples of such wars include the 13th-century Albigensian Crusade in Languedoc and the Northern Crusades in the Baltic region. When asked by a crusader how to distinguish between the Catholics and Cathars following the projected capture (1209) of the city of Béziers, the papal legate Arnaud Amalric allegedly replied, "Kill them all, God will know His own." (Note: According to the Dialogus Miraculorum by Caesarius of Heisterbach, Arnaud Amalric was only reported to have said that.)

Likewise, the inhabitants of conquered cities were frequently massacred during crusades in the 11th and 12th centuries. Noblemen could hope to be ransomed; their families would have to send to their captors large sums of wealth commensurate with the social status of the captive.

Feudal Japan had no custom of ransoming prisoners of war, who could expect for the most part summary execution.

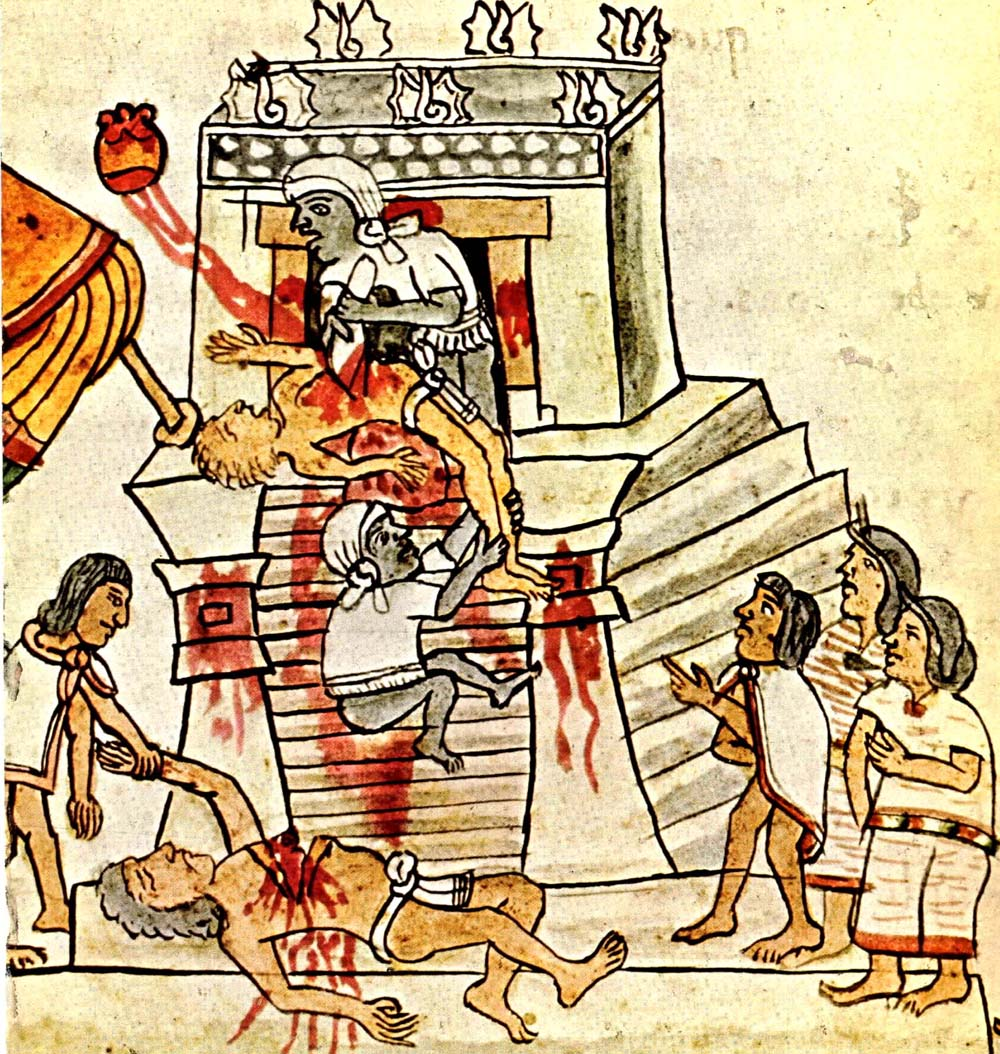
Aztec sacrifices, as depicted in the Codex Mendoza (c. 1541)

In the 13th century the expanding Mongol Empire famously distinguished between cities or towns that surrendered (where the population was spared but required to support the conquering Mongol army) and those that resisted (in which case the city was ransacked and destroyed, and all the population killed). In Termez, on the Oxus: "all the people, both men and women, were driven out onto the plain, and divided in accordance with their usual custom, then they were all slain."

The Aztecs warred constantly with neighbouring tribes and groups, aiming to collect live prisoners for sacrifice. For the re-consecration of Great Pyramid of Tenochtitlan in 1487, "between 10,000 and 80,400 persons" were sacrificed.

During the early Muslim conquests of 622–750, Muslims routinely captured large numbers of prisoners. Aside from those who converted, most were ransomed or enslaved. Christians captured during the Crusades were usually either killed or sold into slavery if they could not pay a ransom. During his lifetime (c. 570 – 632), Muhammad made it the responsibility of the Islamic government to provide food and clothing, on a reasonable basis, to captives, regardless of their religion; however, if the prisoners were in the custody of a person, then the responsibility was on the individual. On certain occasions where Muhammad felt the enemy had broken a treaty with the Muslims he endorsed the mass execution of male prisoners who participated in battles, as in the case of the Banu Qurayza in 627. The Muslims divided up the females and children of those executed as ghanima (spoils of war).

Naval forces from both Christian and Muslim countries often turned prisoners of war into galley slaves. Thus, at the Battle of Lepanto in 1571, 12,000 Christian galley slaves were freed from the Ottoman Turks.

== Modern times ==
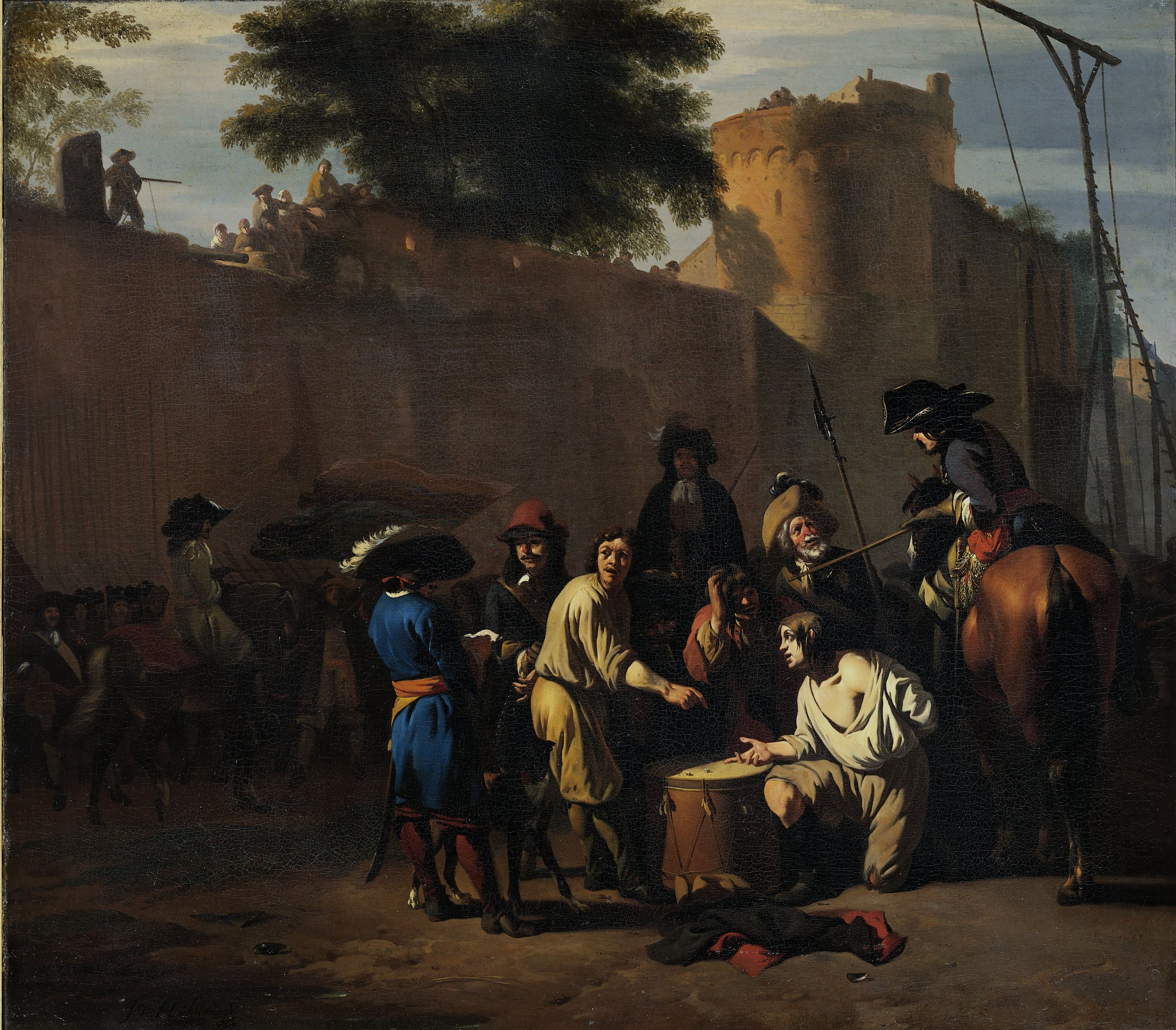
Casting the dice for life or death, by Jan van Huchtenburg

In Europe the treatment of prisoners of war became increasingly centralised in the time period between the 16th and late 18th century. Whereas prisoners of war had previously been regarded as the private property of the captor, captured enemy soldiers were increasingly regarded as state property. The European states strove to exert increasing control over all stages of captivity, from the question of who would be attributed the status of prisoner of war to their eventual release. The act of surrender was regulated so that it, ideally, should be legitimised by officers, who negotiated the surrender of their whole unit. Soldiers whose style of fighting did not conform to the battle line tactics of regular European armies, such as Cossacks and Croats, were often denied the status of prisoners of war.

In line with this development the treatment of prisoners of war was increasingly regulated by international treaties, particularly the so-called cartel system, which regulated how warring states would exchange prisoners. The 1648 Peace of Westphalia, which ended the Thirty Years' War, established the rule that prisoners of war should be released and allowed to return to their homelands without ransom after hostilities ended.

There also evolved the right of parole, French for "discourse", in which a captured officer surrendered his sword and gave his word as a gentleman in exchange for privileges. If he swore not to escape, he could gain better accommodations and the freedom of the prison. If he swore to cease hostilities against the nation that held him captive, he could be repatriated or exchanged but could not serve against his former captors in a military capacity.

=== European settlers captured in North America ===
Early historical narratives of captured European settlers and the perspectives of literate women captured by the indigenous peoples of North America, exist. The writings of Mary Rowlandson, captured in 1676 in the chaotic fighting of King Philip's War, provide an early example. Such narratives enjoyed some popularity, spawning a genre of the captivity narrative, and had lasting influence on the body of early American literature, most notably through the legacy of James Fenimore Cooper's The Last of the Mohicans (1826). Some Native Americans continued to capture Europeans and use them both as labourers and as bargaining chips into the 19th century; see for example the case of John R. Jewitt, a sailor who wrote a memoir about his years as a captive of the Nootka people on the Pacific Northwest coast from 1802 to 1805.

=== Great Northern War ===
During the Great Northern War of 1700 to 1721, Russian authorities sent many Swedish prisoners-of-war, especially those who surrendered after the Battle of Poltava in 1709, to Siberia.

=== French Revolutionary wars and Napoleonic wars ===
The earliest known purpose-built prisoner-of-war camp was established at Norman Cross in Huntingdonshire, England in 1797 to house the increasing number of prisoners from the French Revolutionary Wars and Napoleonic Wars. The average prison population was about 5,500 men. The lowest number recorded was 3,300 in October 1804. On 10 April 1810, the highest number recorded in any official document was 6,272. Norman Cross Prison was intended to be a model depot providing the most humane treatment of prisoners of war. The British government went to great lengths to provide food of a quality at least equal to that available to locals. The senior officer from each quadrangle was permitted to inspect the food as it was delivered to the prison to ensure it was of sufficient quality. Despite the generous supply and quality of food, some prisoners died of starvation after gambling away their rations. Most of the men held in the prison were low-ranking soldiers and sailors, including midshipmen and junior officers, with a small number of privateers. About 100 senior officers and some civilians "of good social standing", mainly passengers on captured ships and the wives of some officers, were given parole outside the prison, mainly in Peterborough although some further afield. They were afforded the courtesy of their rank within English society.

During the Battle of Leipzig, both sides used the city's cemetery as a lazaret and prisoner camp for around 6,000 POWs who lived in burial vaults and used coffins for firewood. Food was scarce and prisoners resorted to eating horses, cats, dogs or even human flesh. The bad conditions inside the graveyard contributed to a city-wide epidemic after the battle.

=== Prisoner exchanges ===
The extensive period of conflict during the American Revolutionary War and Napoleonic Wars (1793–1815), followed by the Anglo-American War of 1812, led to the emergence of a cartel system for the exchange of prisoners, even while the belligerents were at war. A cartel was usually arranged by the respective armed service for the exchange of like-ranked personnel. The aim was to achieve a reduction in the number of prisoners held, while at the same time alleviating shortages of skilled personnel in the home country.

=== American Civil War ===
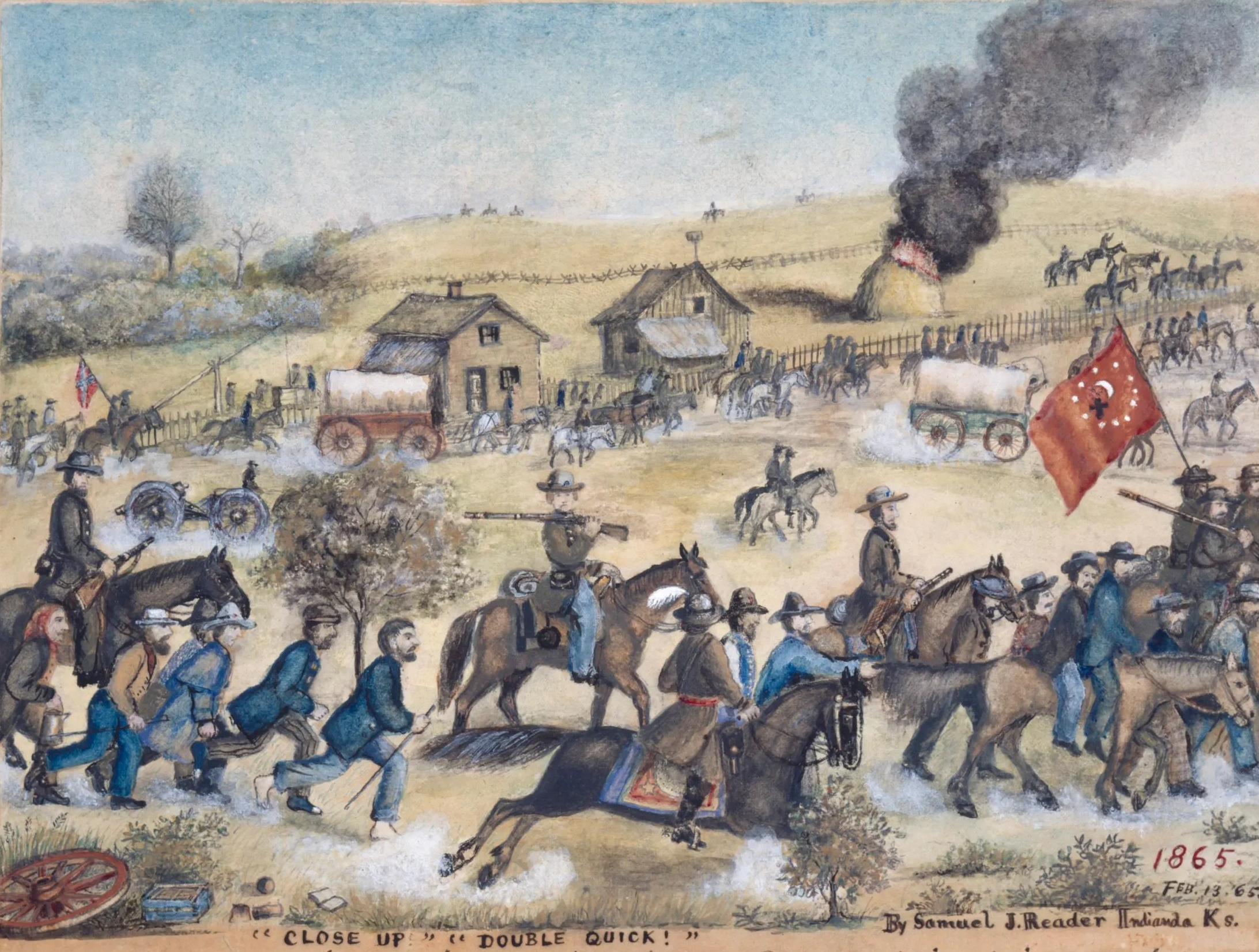
Union prisoners of war on the way to Camp Ford prison in October 1864

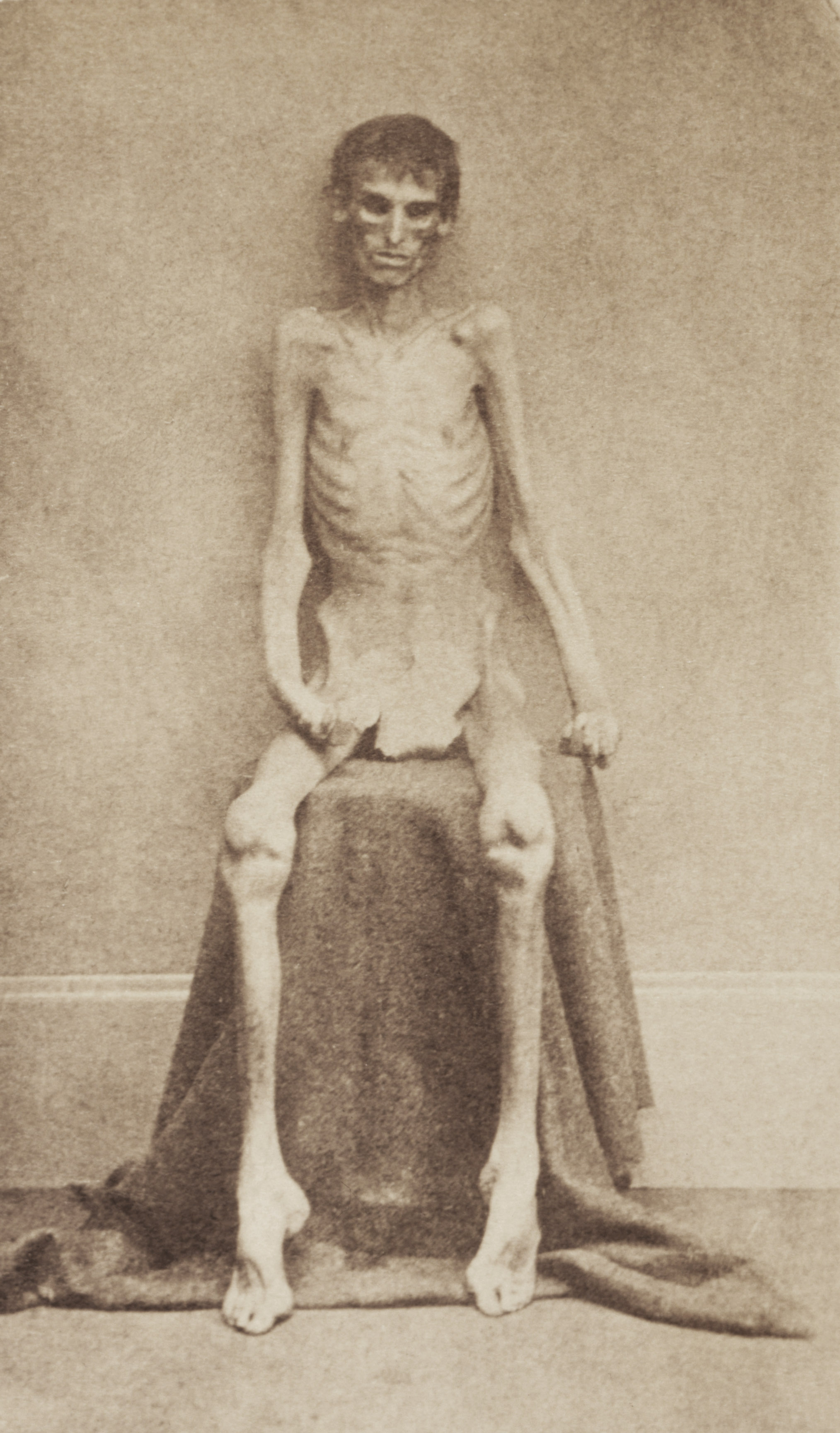
Union Army soldier on his release from a Confederate POW camp, c. 1865

At the start of the American Civil War a system of paroles operated. Captives agreed not to fight until they were officially exchanged. Meanwhile, they were held in camps run by their own army where they were paid but not allowed to perform any military duties. The system of exchanges collapsed in 1863 when the Confederacy refused to exchange black prisoners.

In the late summer of 1864, a year after the Dix–Hill Cartel was suspended, Confederate officials approached Union General Benjamin Butler, Union Commissioner of Exchange, about resuming the cartel and including the black prisoners. Butler contacted Grant for guidance on the issue, and Grant responded to Butler on 18 August 1864 with his now famous statement. He rejected the offer, stating in essence, that the Union could afford to leave their men in captivity, the Confederacy could not. After that about 56,000 of the 409,000 POWs died in prisons during the American Civil War, accounting for nearly 10% of the conflict's fatalities. Of the 45,000 Union prisoners of war confined in Camp Sumter, located near Andersonville, Georgia, 13,000 (28%) died. At Camp Douglas in Chicago, Illinois, 10% of its Confederate prisoners died during one cold winter month; and Elmira Prison in New York state, with a death rate of 25% (2,963), nearly equalled that of Andersonville.

=== Amelioration ===
During the 19th century there were increased efforts to improve the treatment and processing of prisoners. As a result of these emerging conventions, a number of international conferences were held, starting with the Brussels Conference of 1874, with nations agreeing that it was necessary to prevent inhumane treatment of prisoners and the use of weapons causing unnecessary harm. Although no agreements were immediately ratified by the participating nations, work was continued that resulted in new conventions being adopted and becoming recognised as international law that specified that prisoners of war be treated humanely and diplomatically.

=== Hague and Geneva Conventions ===
Chapter II of the Annex to the 1907 Hague Convention IV – The Laws and Customs of War on Land covered the treatment of prisoners of war in detail. These provisions were further expanded in the 1929 Geneva Convention on the Prisoners of War and were largely revised in the Third Geneva Convention in 1949.

Article 4 of the Third Geneva Convention protects captured military personnel, some guerrilla fighters, and certain civilians. It applies from the moment of capture until release or repatriation. Under the 1949 Geneva Conventions, POWs are protected persons, meaning their deprivation of rights afforded by the Third Convention could amount to a war crime. Article 17 of the Third Geneva Convention states that POWs can only be required to give their name, date of birth, rank and service number.

The ICRC has a special role to play, with regards to international humanitarian law, in restoring and maintaining family contact in times of war, in particular concerning the right of prisoners of war and internees to send and receive letters and cards (Geneva Convention (GC) III, art. 71 and GC IV, art. 107).

However, nations vary in their dedication to following these laws, and historically the treatment of POWs has varied greatly. During World War II, Imperial Japan and Nazi Germany were notorious for atrocities against prisoners of war. The German military used the Soviet Union's refusal to sign the Geneva Convention as a reason for not providing the necessities of life to Soviet POWs; the Soviets also used Axis prisoners as forced labour. The Germans routinely executed Allied commandos captured behind German lines per the Commando Order.

==== Qualifications ====
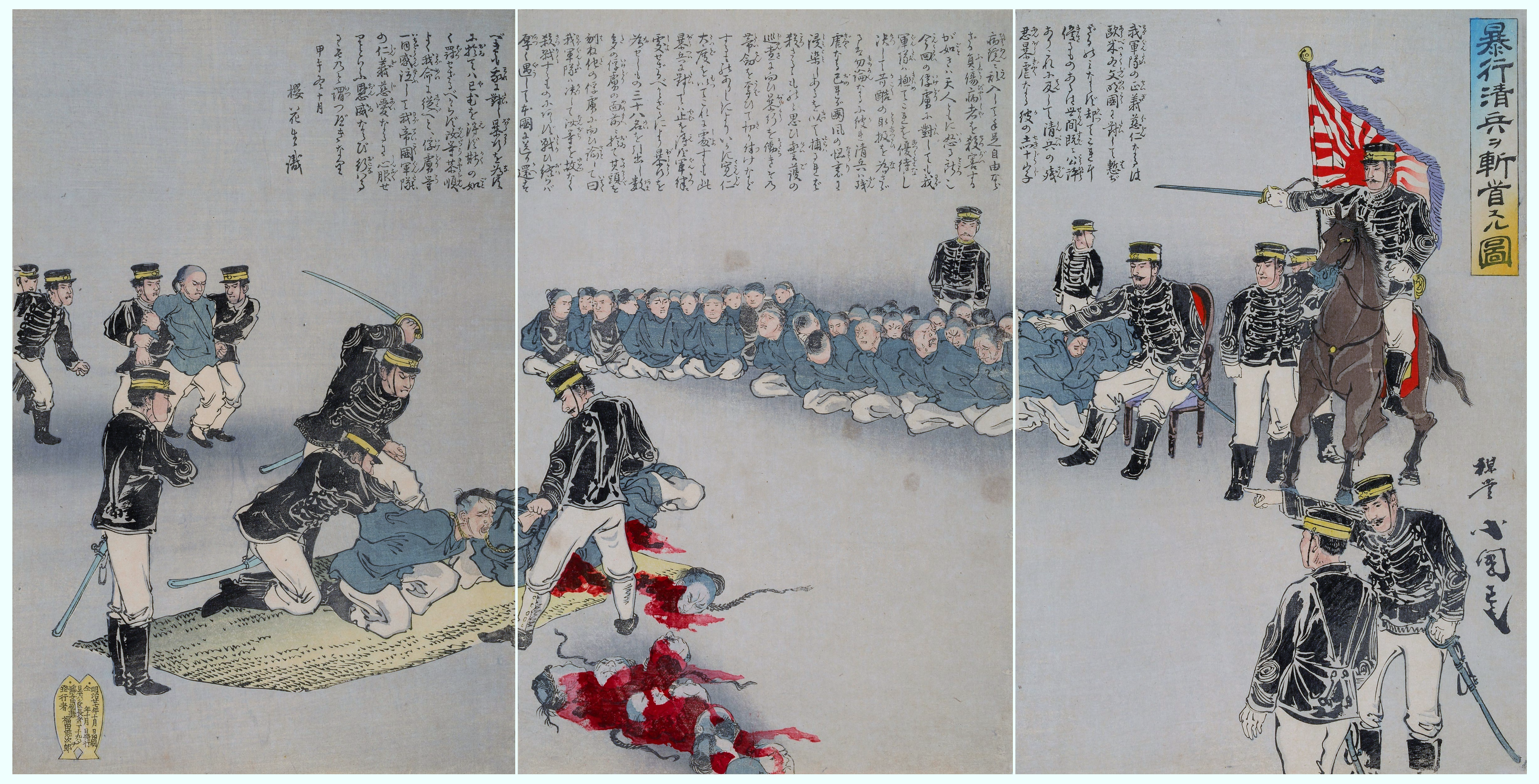
Japanese illustration depicting the beheading of Chinese captives during the First Sino-Japanese War of 1894–95

To be entitled to POW status, captured persons must be lawful combatants entitled to combatant's privilege—which provides immunity from punishment for lawful acts of war, such as killing enemy combatants. To qualify under the Third Geneva Convention, a combatant must be part of a chain of command, wear a "fixed distinctive marking, visible from a distance", bear arms openly, and have conducted military operations according to the laws and customs of war. The Convention recognises a few other groups as well, such as "Inhabitants of a non-occupied territory, who on the approach of the enemy spontaneously take up arms to resist the invading forces, without having had time to form themselves into regular armed units".

Under Additional Protocol I, the requirement of a distinctive marking is waived. Francs-tireurs, militias, insurgents, terrorists, saboteurs, mercenaries, and spies generally do not qualify because they do not fulfill the criteria of Additional Protocol I and are therefore unlawful combatants. Captured soldiers who do not get POW status are still protected like civilians under the Fourth Geneva Convention.

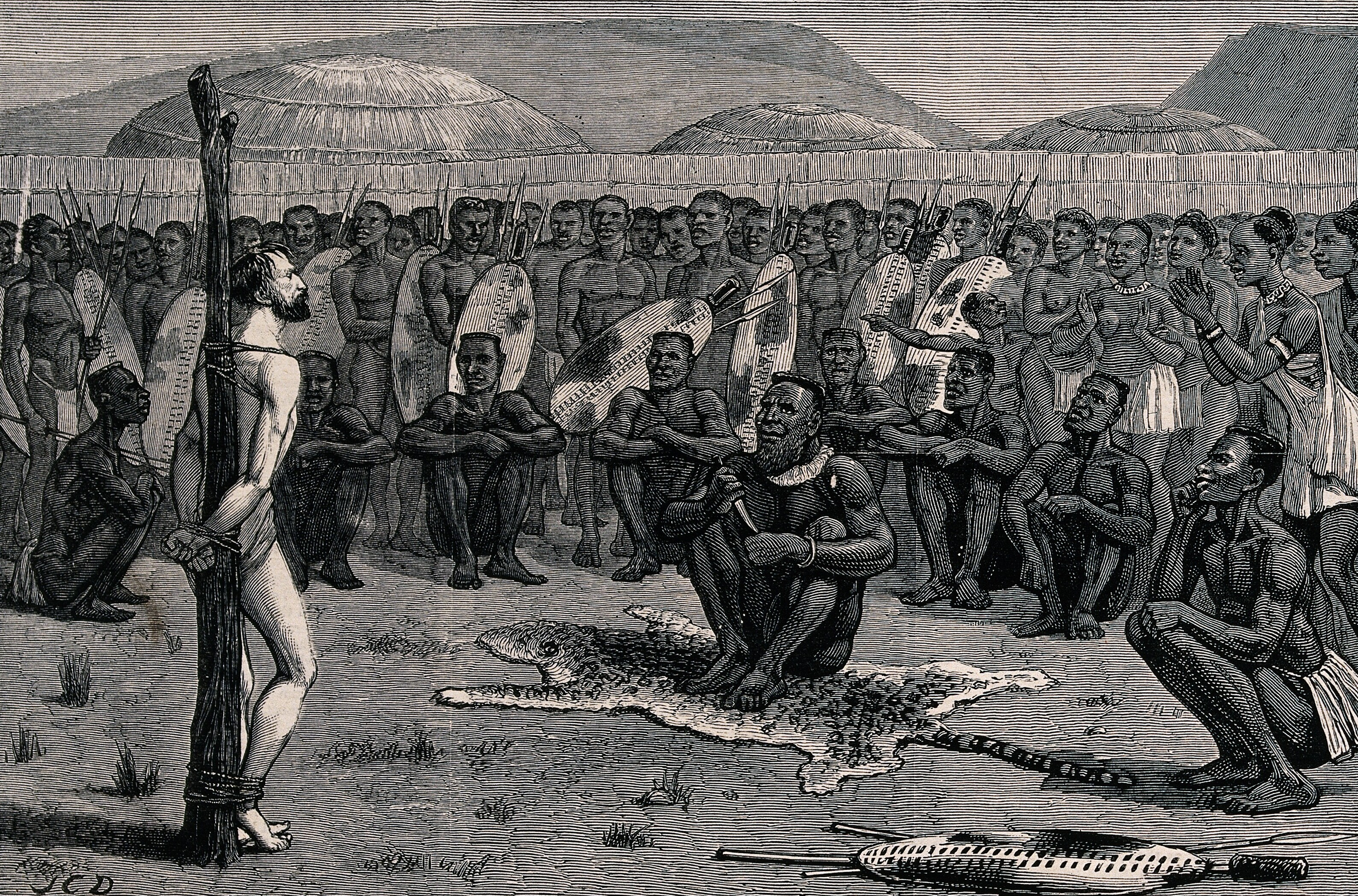
Ernest Grandier captured during the Anglo-Zulu War

The criteria are applied primarily to international armed conflicts. The application of prisoner of war status in non-international armed conflicts like civil wars is guided by Additional Protocol II, but insurgents are often treated as traitors, terrorists, or criminals by government forces and are sometimes executed on spot or tortured. Guerrillas and other irregular combatants generally cannot expect to receive benefits from both civilian and military status simultaneously.

=== Rights ===
Under the Third Geneva Convention, prisoners of war (POW) must be:

- Treated humanely with respect for their persons and their honour
- Able to inform their next of kin and the International Committee of the Red Cross of their capture
- Allowed to communicate regularly with relatives and receive packages
- Given adequate food, clothing, housing, and medical attention
- Paid for work done and not forced to do work that is dangerous, unhealthy, or degrading
- Released quickly after conflicts end
- Not compelled to give any information except for name, age, rank, and service number

In addition, if wounded or sick on the battlefield, the prisoner will receive help from the International Committee of the Red Cross.

When a country is responsible for breaches of prisoner of war rights, those accountable will be punished accordingly. An example of this is the Nuremberg and Tokyo Trials. German and Japanese military commanders were prosecuted for preparing and initiating a war of aggression, murder, ill treatment, and deportation of individuals, and genocide during World War II. Most were executed or sentenced to life in prison for their crimes.

=== U.S. Code of Conduct and terminology ===
The United States Military Code of Conduct was promulgated in 1955 via Executive Order 10631 under President Dwight D. Eisenhower to serve as a moral code for United States service members who have been taken prisoner. It was created primarily in response to the breakdown of leadership and organisation, specifically when U.S. forces were POWs during the Korean War.

When a military member is taken prisoner, the Code of Conduct reminds them that the chain of command is still in effect (the highest ranking service member eligible for command, regardless of service branch, is in command), and requires them to support their leadership. The Code of Conduct also requires service members to resist giving information to the enemy (beyond identifying themselves, that is, "name, rank, serial number"), receiving special favours or parole, or otherwise providing their enemy captors aid and comfort.

Since the Vietnam War, the official U.S. military term for enemy POWs is EPW (Enemy Prisoner of War). This name change was introduced to distinguish between enemy and U.S. captives.

In 2000 the U.S. military replaced the designation "Prisoner of War" for captured American personnel with "Missing-Captured". A January 2008 directive states that the reasoning behind this is since "Prisoner of War" is the international legal recognised status for such people there is no need for any individual country to follow suit. This change remains relatively unknown even among experts in the field and "Prisoner of War" remains widely used in the Pentagon which has a "POW/Missing Personnel Office" and awards the Prisoner of War Medal.

== World War I ==
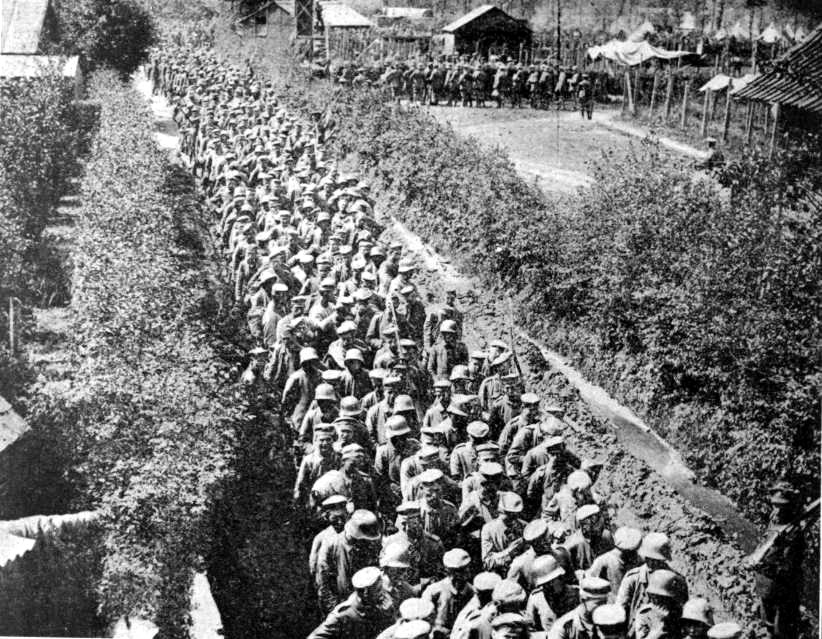
German soldiers captured by the British in Flanders

During World War I, about eight million men surrendered and were held in POW camps until the war ended. All nations pledged to follow the Hague rules on fair treatment of prisoners of war, and in general the POWs had a much higher survival rate than their peers who were not captured. Individual surrenders were uncommon; usually a large unit surrendered all its men. At Tannenberg 92,000 Russians surrendered during the battle. When the besieged garrison of Kaunas surrendered in 1915, 20,000 Russians became prisoners. Over half the Russian losses were prisoners as a proportion of those captured, wounded or killed. About 3.3 million men became prisoners.

The German Empire held 2.5 million prisoners; Russia held 2.9 million, and Britain and France held about 720,000, mostly gained in the period just before the Armistice in 1918. The US held 48,000. The most dangerous moment for POWs was the act of surrender, when helpless soldiers were sometimes killed or mistakenly shot down. Once prisoners reached a POW camp conditions were better (and often much better than in World War II), thanks in part to the efforts of the International Red Cross and inspections by neutral nations.

There was much harsh treatment of POWs in Germany, as recorded by the American ambassador (prior to America's entry into the war), James W. Gerard, who published his findings in My Four Years in Germany. Even worse conditions are reported in the book Escape of a Princess Pat by the Canadian George Pearson. It was particularly bad in Russia, where starvation was common for prisoners and civilians alike; a quarter of the over 2 million POWs held there died. Nearly 375,000 of the 500,000 Austro-Hungarian prisoners of war taken by Russians perished in Siberia from smallpox and typhus. In Germany, food was short, but only 5 per cent died.

The Ottoman Empire often treated prisoners of war poorly. Some 11,800 British soldiers, most from the British Indian Army, became prisoners after the five-month Siege of Kut, in Mesopotamia, in April 1916. Many were weak and starved when they surrendered and 4,250 died in captivity.

During the Sinai and Palestine campaign 217 Australian and unknown numbers of British, New Zealand and Indian soldiers were captured by Ottoman forces. About 50 per cent of the Australian prisoners were light horsemen including 48 missing believed captured on 1 May 1918 in the Jordan Valley. Australian Flying Corps pilots and observers were captured in the Sinai Peninsula, Palestine and the Levant. One third of all Australian prisoners were captured on Gallipoli including the crew of the submarine AE2 which made a passage through the Dardanelles in 1915. Forced marches and crowded railway journeys preceded years in camps where disease, poor diet and inadequate medical facilities prevailed. About 25 per cent of other ranks died, many from malnutrition, while only one officer died. The most curious case came in Russia where the Czechoslovak Legion of Czechoslovak prisoners (from the Austro-Hungarian army) who were released and armed to fight on the side of the Entente, who briefly served as a military and diplomatic force during the Russian Civil War.

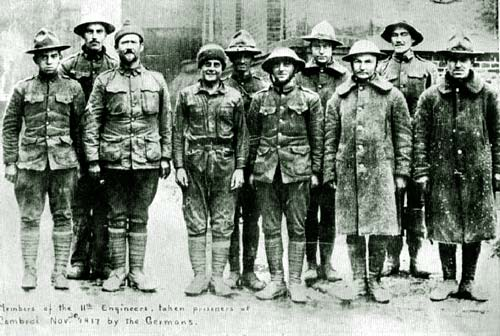
American soldiers of the 11th Engineer Regiment taken as prisoners of war by Germany in 1917

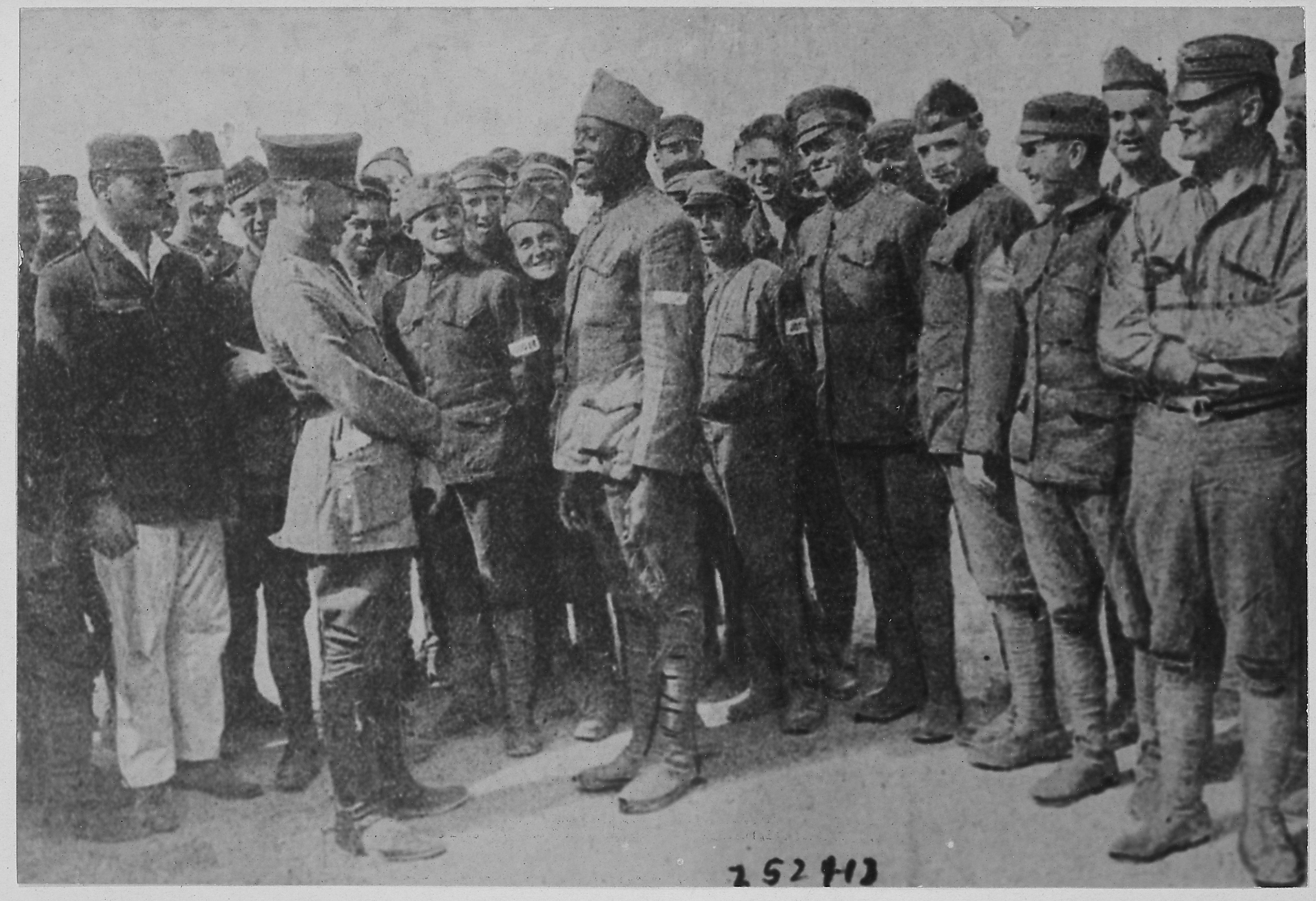
US POWs at German prison camp Rastatt, Germany 1918

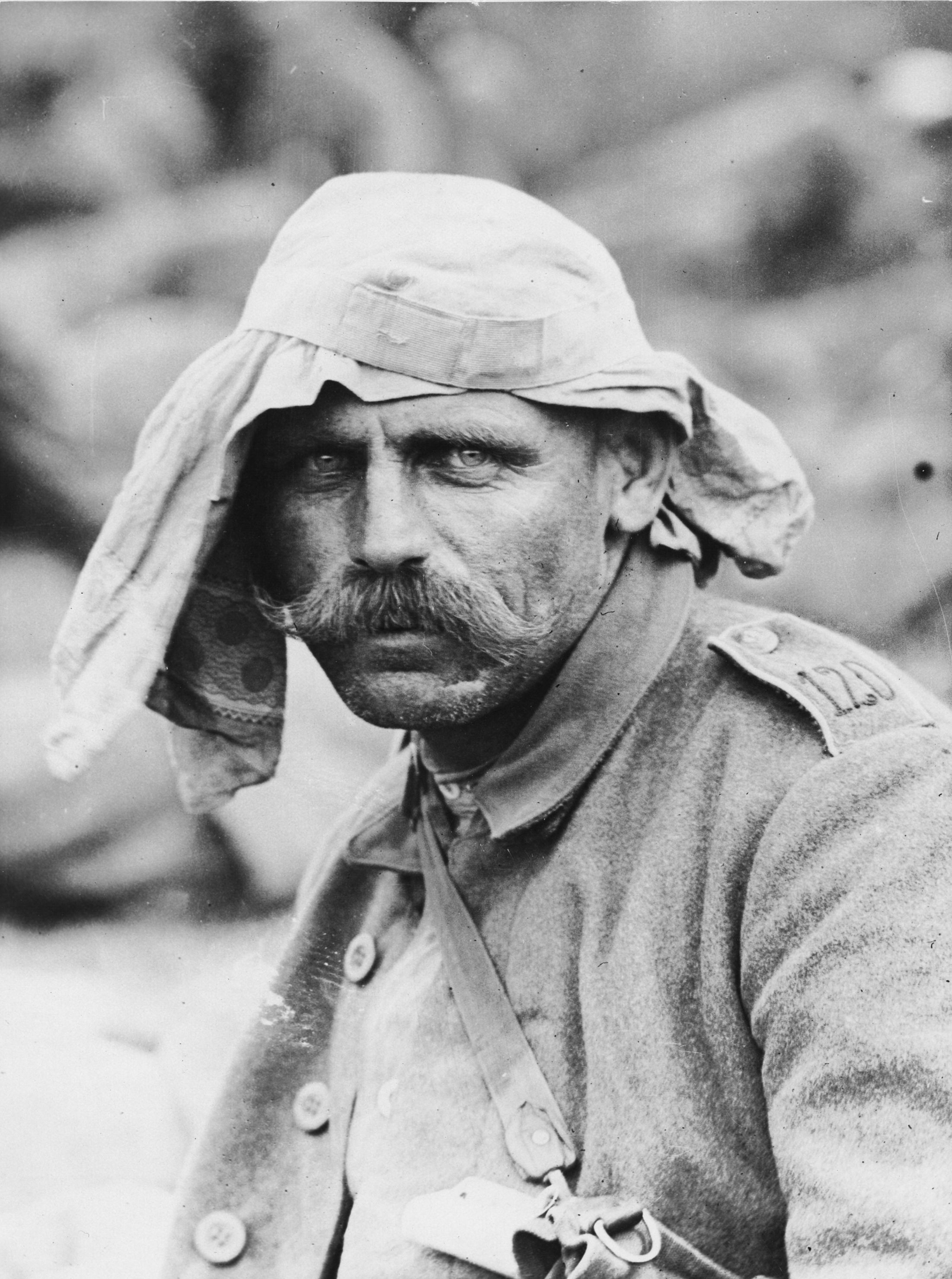
German soldier of Infantry Regiment 120, POW 1 January 1918

=== Release of prisoners ===
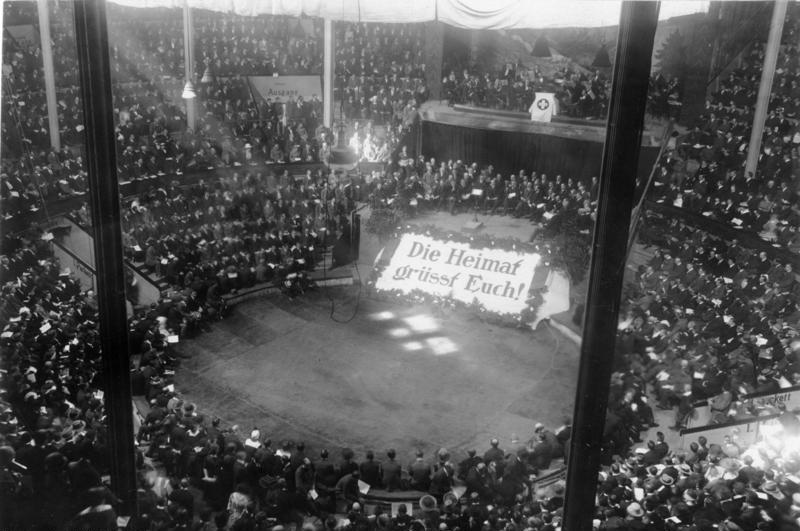
Celebration for returning POWs, Berlin 1920

At the end of the war in 1918 there were believed to be 140,000 British prisoners of war in Germany, including thousands of internees held in neutral Switzerland. The first British prisoners were released and reached Calais on 15 November. Plans were made for them to be sent via Dunkirk to Dover and a large reception camp was established at Dover capable of housing 40,000 men, which could later be used for demobilisation.

On 13 December 1918, the armistice was extended and the Allies reported that by 9 December 264,000 prisoners had been repatriated. A very large number of these had been released en masse and sent across Allied lines without any food or shelter. This created difficulties for the receiving Allies and many ex-prisoners died from exhaustion. The released POWs were met by cavalry troops and sent back through the lines in lorries to reception centres where they were refitted with boots and clothing and dispatched to the ports in trains.

Upon arrival at the receiving camp the POWs were registered and "boarded" before being dispatched to their own homes. All commissioned officers had to write a report on the circumstances of their capture and to ensure that they had done all they could to avoid capture. Each returning officer and man was given a message from King George V, written in his own hand and reproduced on a lithograph.

The Queen joins me in welcoming you on your release from the miseries & hardships, which you have endured with so much patience and courage.

During these many months of trial, the early rescue of our gallant Officers & Men from the cruelties of their captivity has been uppermost in our thoughts.

We are thankful that this longed for day has arrived, & that back in the old Country you will be able once more to enjoy the happiness of a home & to see good days among those who anxiously look for your return.

— George R.I.

While the Allied prisoners were sent home at the end of the war, the same treatment was not granted to Central Powers prisoners of the Allies and Russia, many of whom had to serve as forced labour, e.g. in France, until 1920. They were released after many approaches by the ICRC to the Allied Supreme Council.

== World War II ==
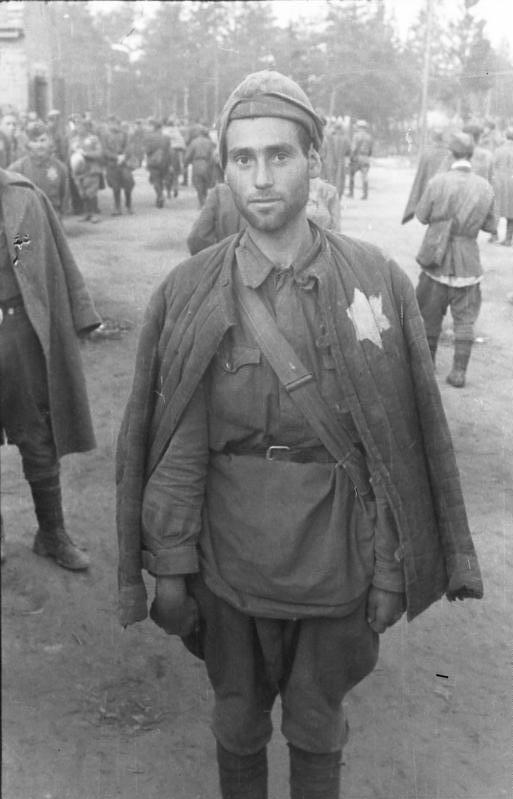
Jewish USSR POW captured by German Army, August 1941. At least 50,000 Jewish soldiers were executed after selection.

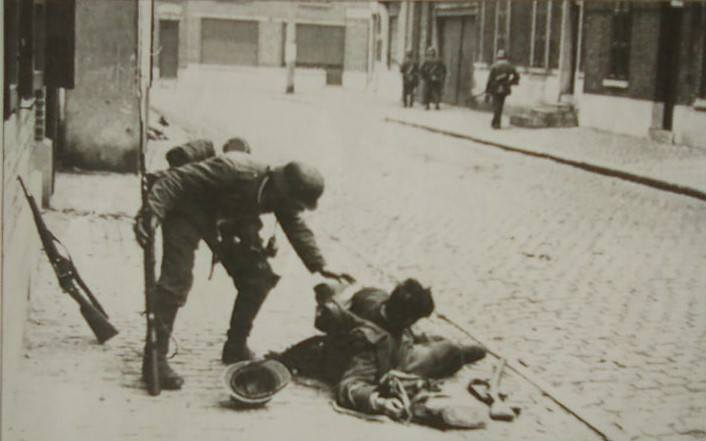
A German soldier assisting a wounded French soldier in Thulin, Belgium, May 1940

Historian Niall Ferguson, in addition to figures from Keith Lowe, tabulated the total death rate for POWs in World War II as follows:

Category		Percentage of POWs that died
Captives	Captors	Percentage of POWs that died
Chinese	Japanese	60% (Note: Including captured soldiers massacred in the battlefield like in the Nanjing Massacre)
USSR	Germans	62%
Germans	Yugoslavs	41.2%
Germans	USSR	18%
Americans	Japanese	33.0%
Germans	Eastern Europeans	32.9%
British	Japanese	24.8%
French	Germans	4.1%
British	Germans	3.5%
Germans	French	2.6%
Americans	Germans	1.2%
Germans	Americans	0.2%
Germans	British	<0.1%

=== Treatment of POWs by the Axis ===
==== Empire of Japan ====
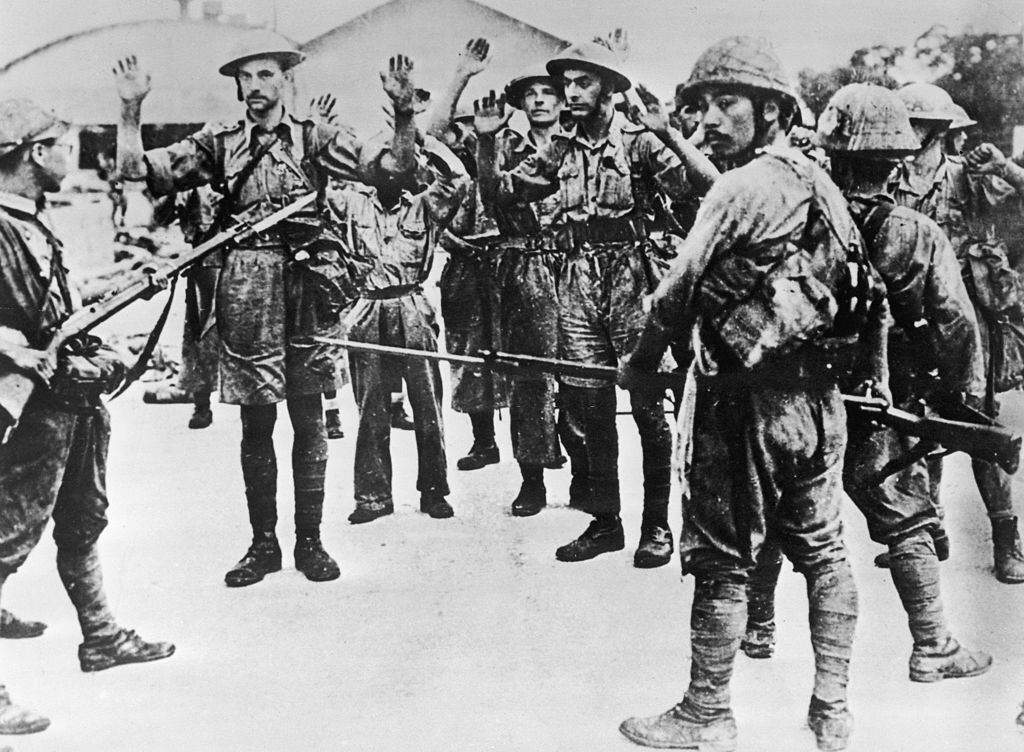
Troops of the Suffolk Regiment surrendering to the Japanese after the Battle of Singapore, 1942

The Empire of Japan, which had signed but never ratified the 1929 Geneva Convention on Prisoners of War, did not treat prisoners of war in accordance with international agreements, including provisions of the Hague Conventions, either during the Second Sino-Japanese War or during the Pacific War, because the Japanese viewed surrender as dishonorable. Moreover, according to a directive ratified on 5 August 1937 by Emperor Hirohito, the constraints of the Hague Conventions were explicitly removed on Chinese prisoners of war.

Prisoners of war from China, the United States, Australia, Britain, Canada, India, the Netherlands, New Zealand, the Philippines, and Japanese-occupied Asia, held by Japanese imperial armed forces were subject to murder, torture (both physical and psychological), beatings, extrajudicial punishment, slavery, medical experiments, starvation rations, poor medical treatment and even cannibalism. The most notorious use of forced labour was in the construction of the Burma–Thailand Death Railway. After 20 March 1943, the Imperial Navy was ordered to kill prisoners of war taken at sea. After the Armistice of Cassibile, Italian soldiers and civilians in East Asia were taken as prisoners of war by Japanese armed forces and subject to the same conditions as other POWs.

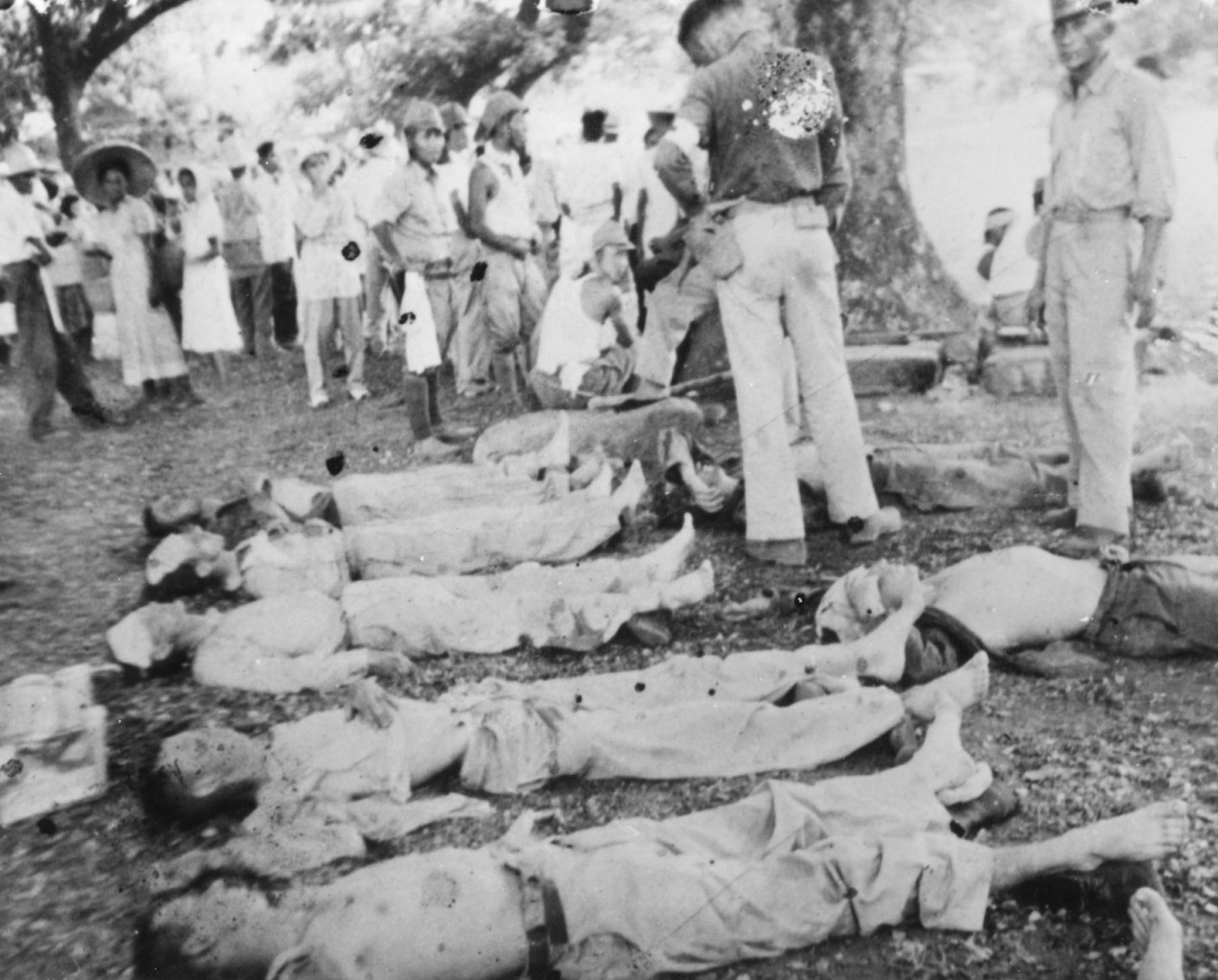
Thousands of US and Filipino POWs died on the Bataan Death March, April 1942

According to the findings of the Tokyo Tribunal, the Japanese captured 350,000 POWs, of which 131,134 came from Britain, the Netherlands, Australia, the United States, Canada, and New Zealand. Of these 131,134 POWs, 35,756 died while detained, the death rate of Western prisoners was thus 27.1 per cent, seven times that of Western POWs under the Germans and Italians. The death rate of Chinese was much higher. Thus, while 37,583 prisoners from the United Kingdom, 28,500 from the Netherlands, and 14,473 from the United States were released after the surrender of Japan, the number for the Chinese was only 56. The 27,465 US Army POWs captured in the Pacific Theater, including Filipinos, had a 40.4 per cent death rate. The War Ministry in Tokyo issued an order at the end of the war allowing local commanders to kill remaining POWs without formal orders from Tokyo.

Number of Western Allied POWs and Death Rate Under the Japanese
Country	Number of POWs	Number of Deaths	Death Rate (%)
Australia	21,726	7,412	34.1
Canada	1,691	273	16.1
New Zealand	121	31	25.6
The Netherlands	37,000	8,500	22.9
United Kingdom	50,016	12,433	24.8
United States	21,580	7,107	32.9
Total	132,134	35,756	27.1

No direct access to the POWs was provided to the International Red Cross. Escapes among the prisoners of European descent were almost impossible because of the difficulty of hiding in Asiatic populations.

Allied POW camps and ship-transports became accidental targets of Allied attacks. The number of deaths which occurred when Japanese "hell ships"—unmarked transport ships in which POWs were transported in harsh conditions—were attacked by U.S. Navy submarines was particularly high. Gavan Daws has calculated that "of all POWs who died in the Pacific War, one in three was killed on the water by friendly fire". Daws states that 10,800 of the 50,000 POWs shipped by the Japanese were killed at sea while Donald L. Miller states that "approximately 21,000 Allied POWs died at sea, about 19,000 of them killed by friendly fire."

Life in the POW camps was recorded at great risk to themselves by artists such as Jack Bridger Chalker, Philip Meninsky, Ashley George Old, and Ronald Searle. Human hair was often used for brushes, plant juices and blood for paint, toilet paper as the "canvas". Some of their works were used as evidence in the trials of Japanese war criminals.

Female prisoners (detainees) at Changi Prison in Singapore, recorded their ordeal in seemingly harmless prison quilt embroidery.

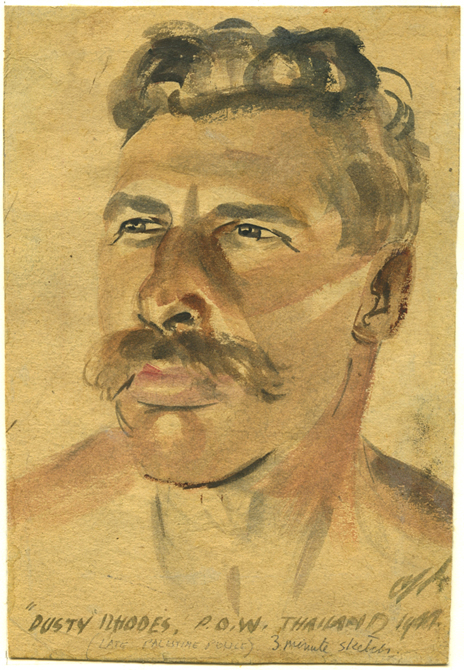
Water colour sketch of "Dusty" Rhodes by Ashley George Old

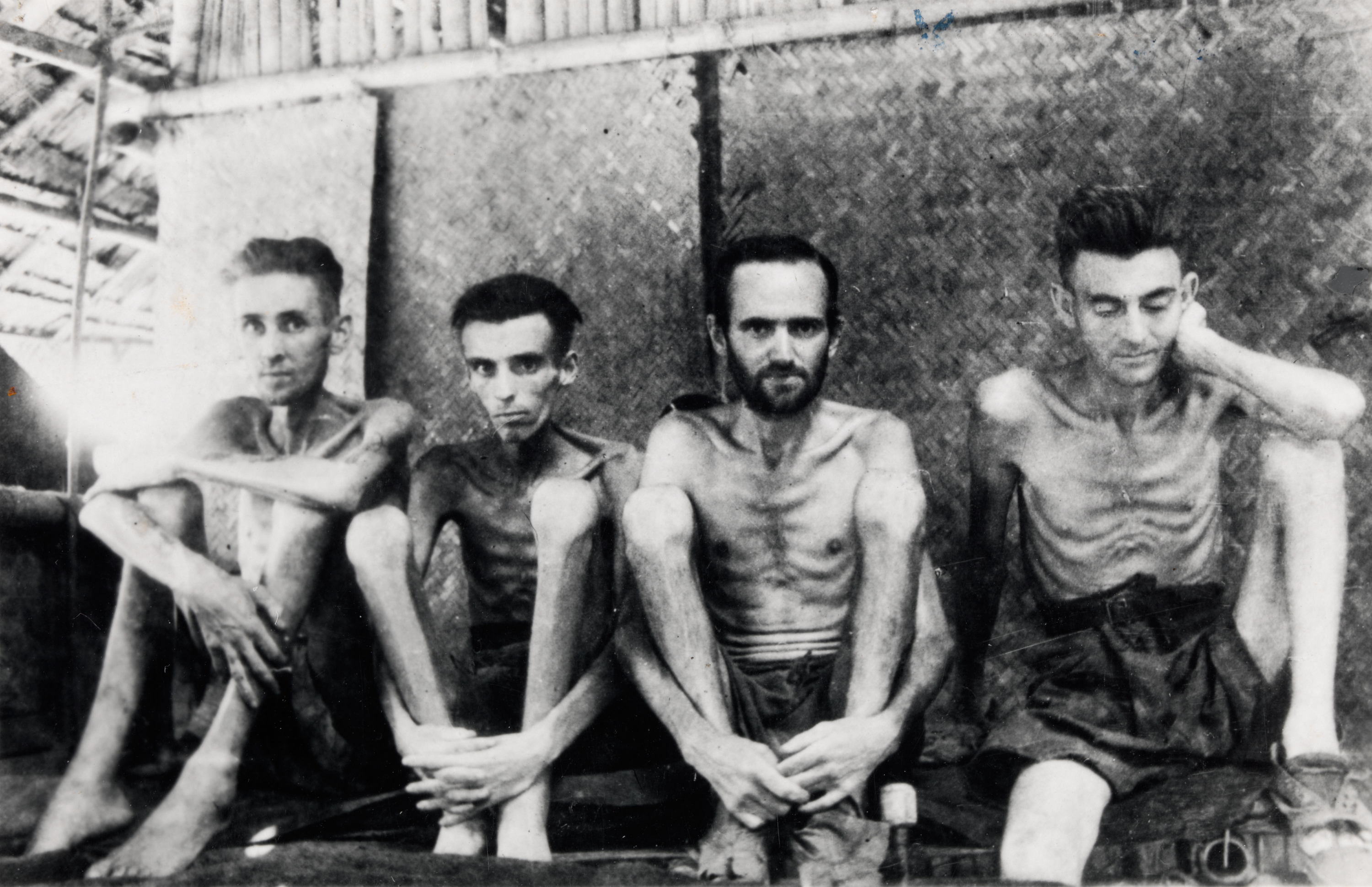
Australian and Dutch POWs at Tarsau, Thailand in 1943

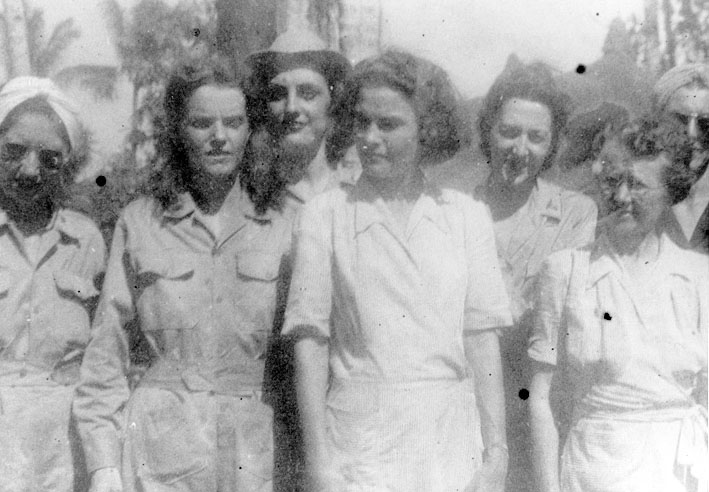
U.S. Army Nurses in Santo Tomas Internment Camp, 1943

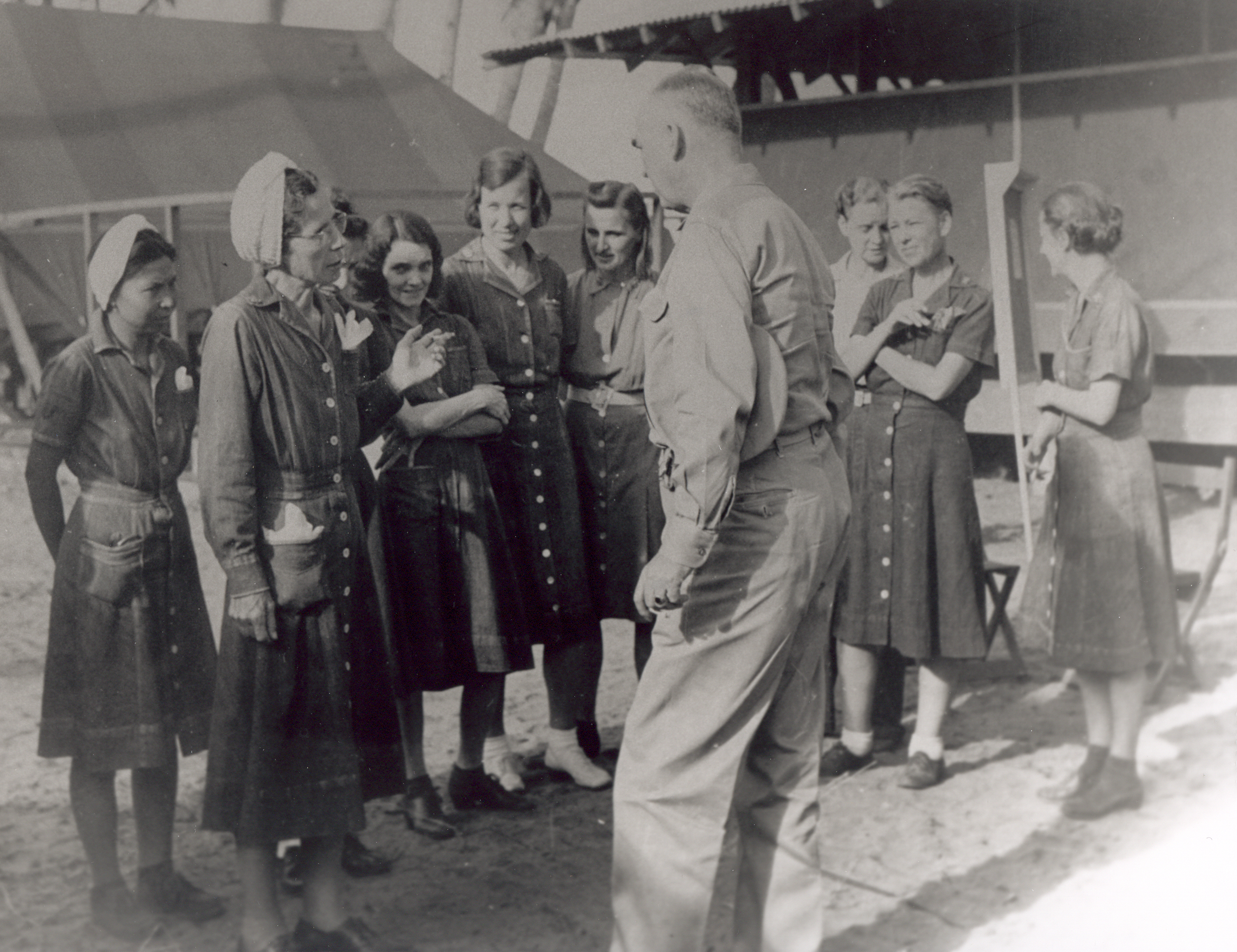
U.S. Navy nurses rescued from Los Baños Internment Camp, March 1945

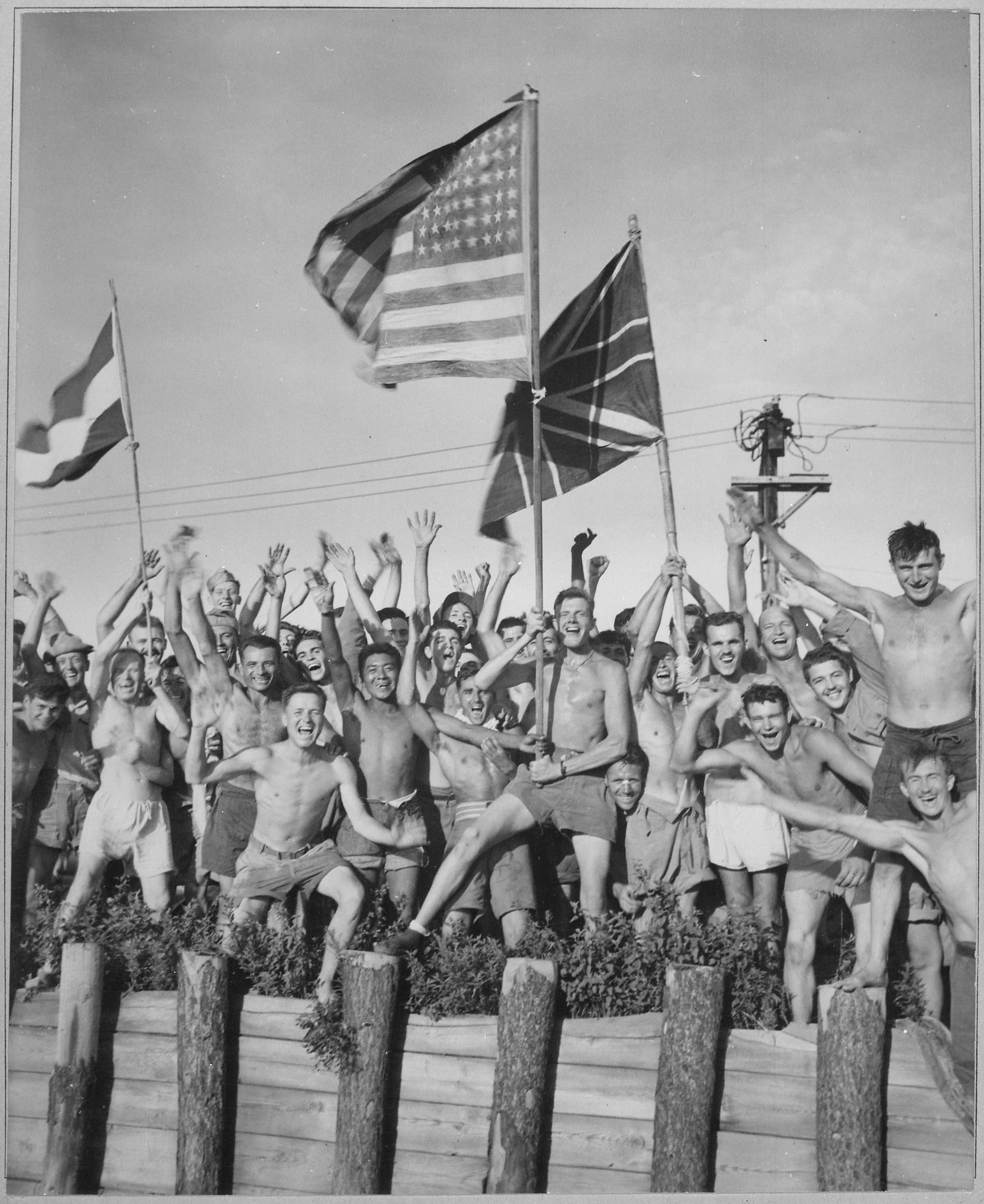
gaunt Allied prisoners of war at Aomori camp near Yokohama, Japan, waving flags of the United States, Great Britain, and the Netherlands in August 1945

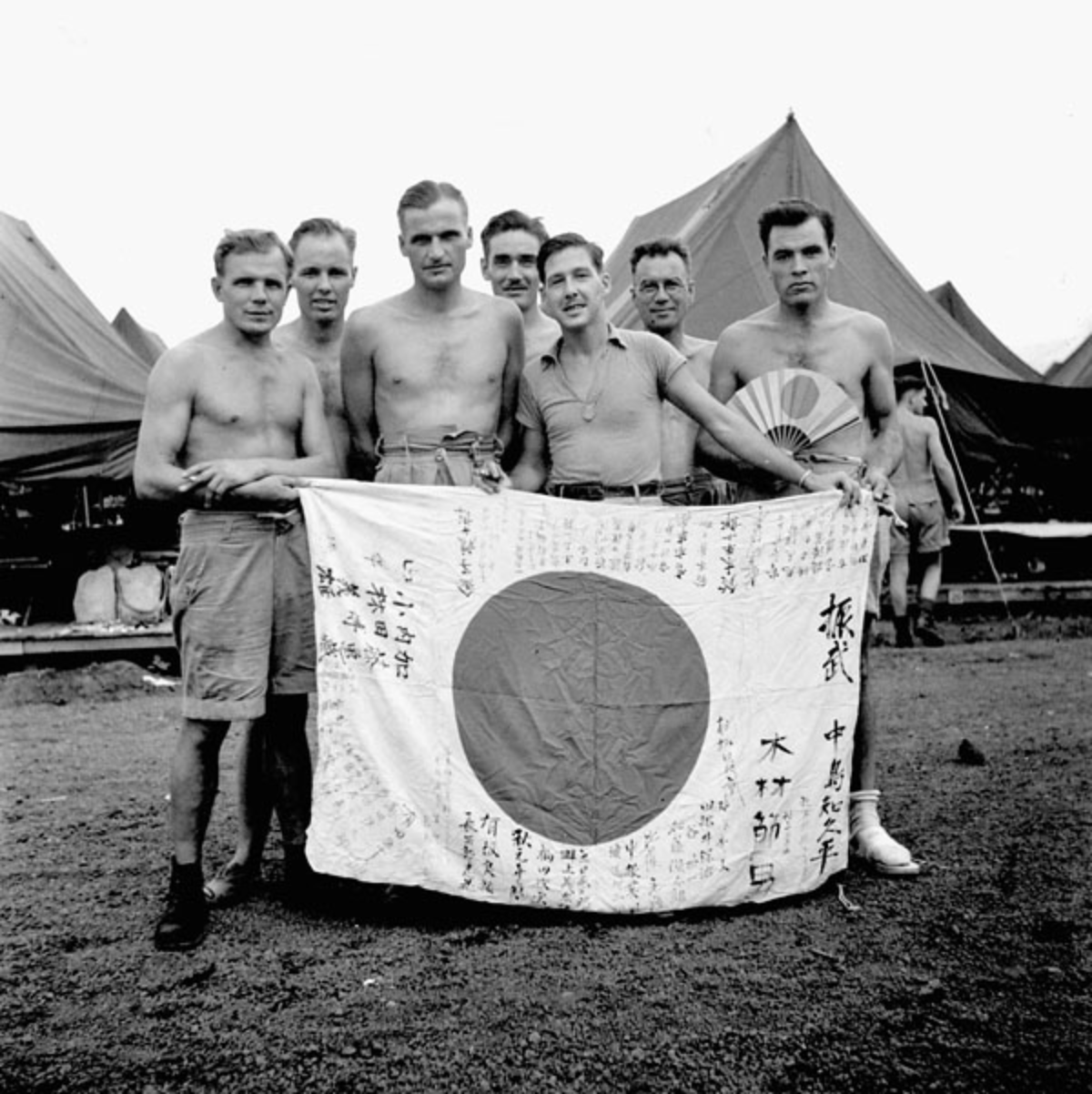
Liberated Canadian POWs arriving in Manila, Philippines, 1945

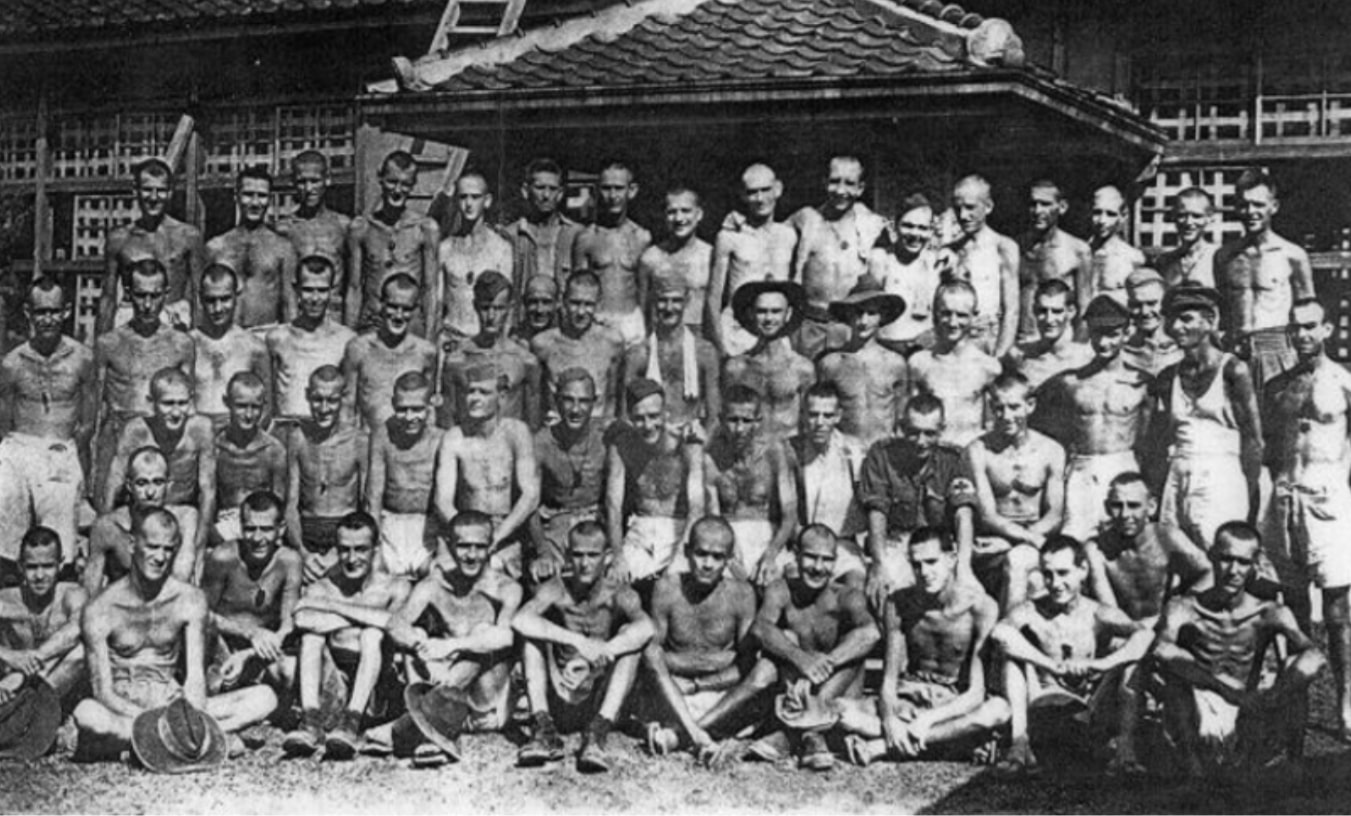
Malnourished Australian POWs forced to work at the Aso mining company, August 1945

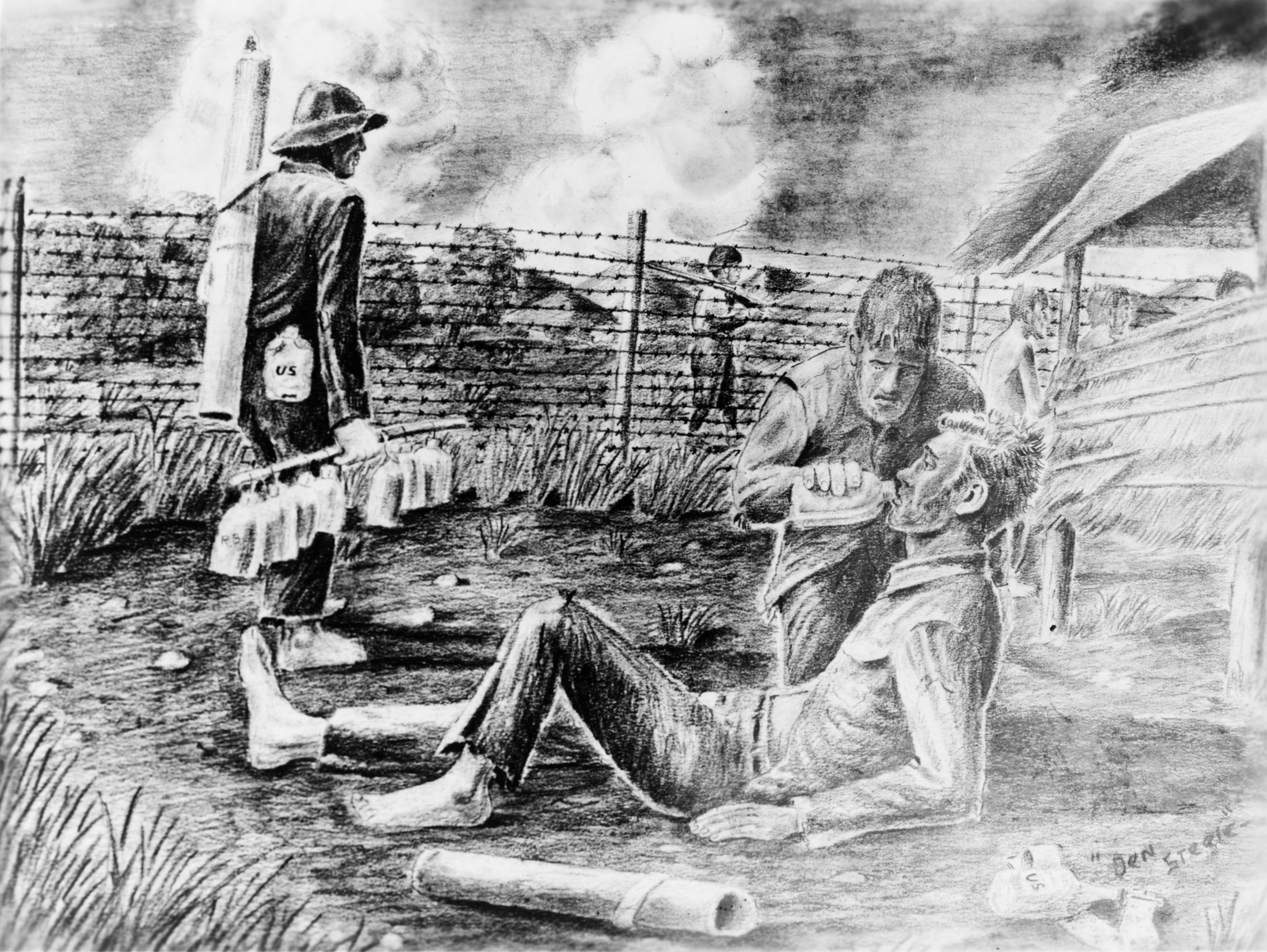
POW art depicting Cabanatuan prison camp, produced in 1946

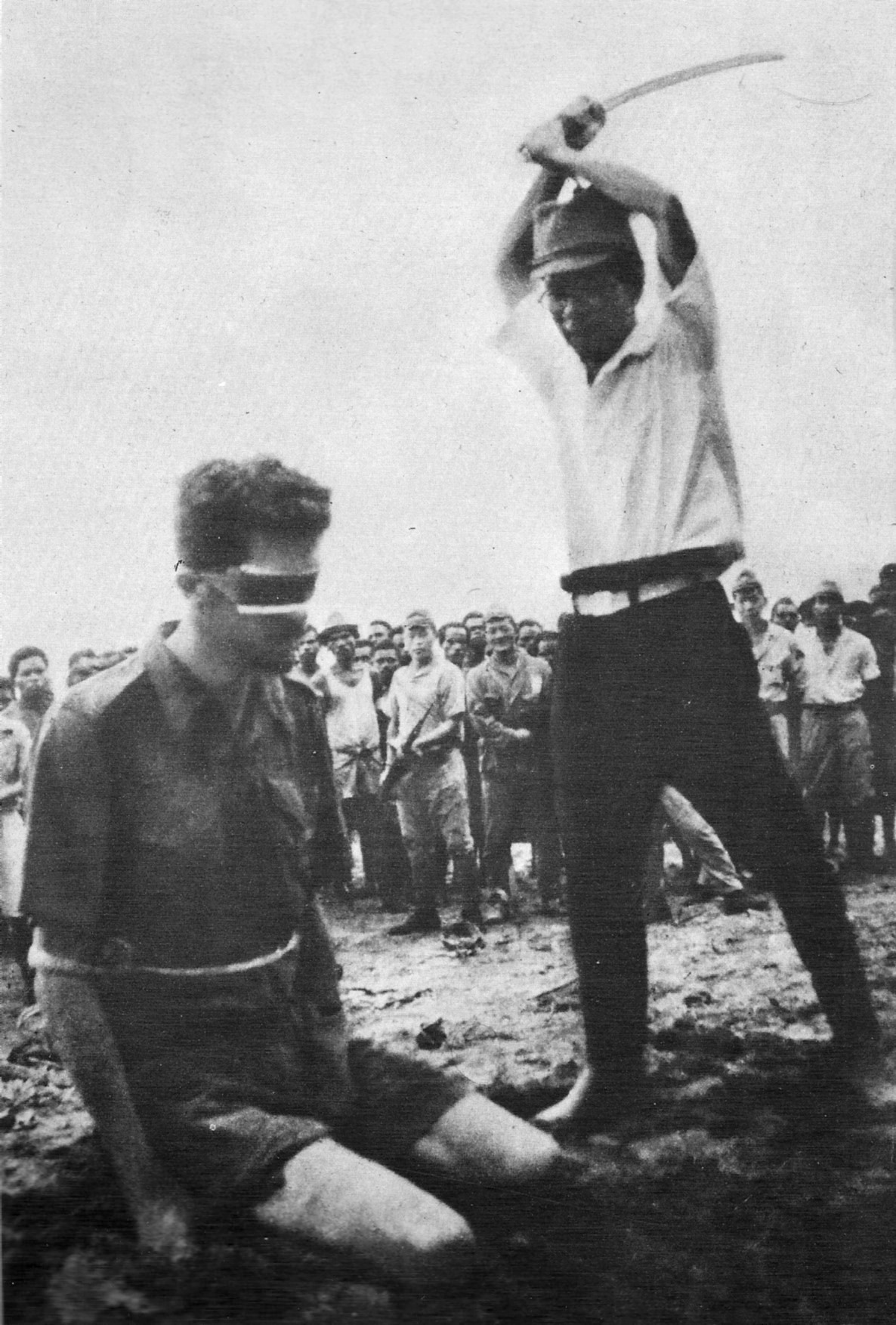
Australian POW Leonard Siffleet captured at New Guinea moments before his execution with a Japanese shin gunto sword in 1943

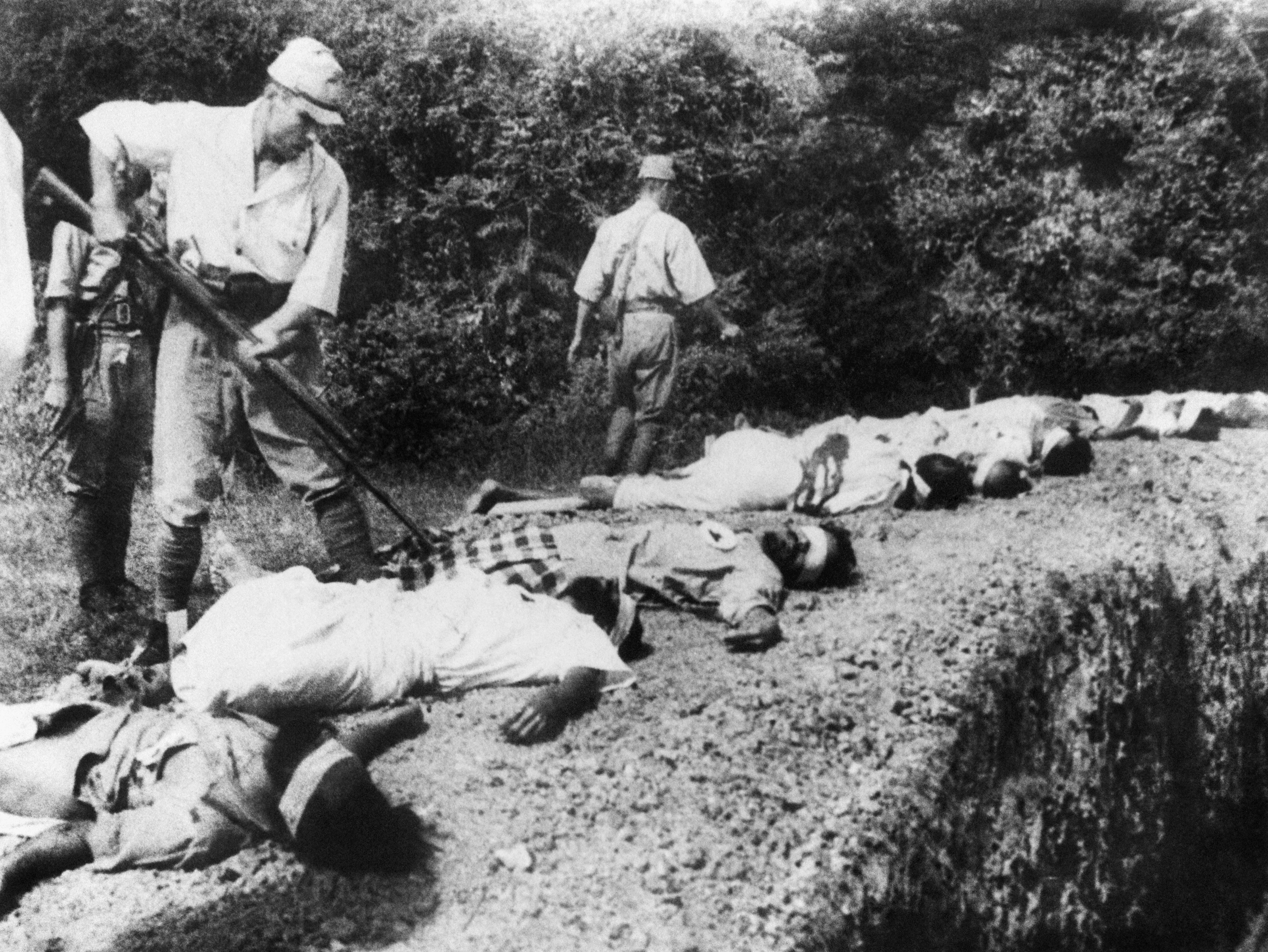
Captured soldiers of the British Indian Army executed by the Japanese

==== Germany ====
===== French soldiers =====
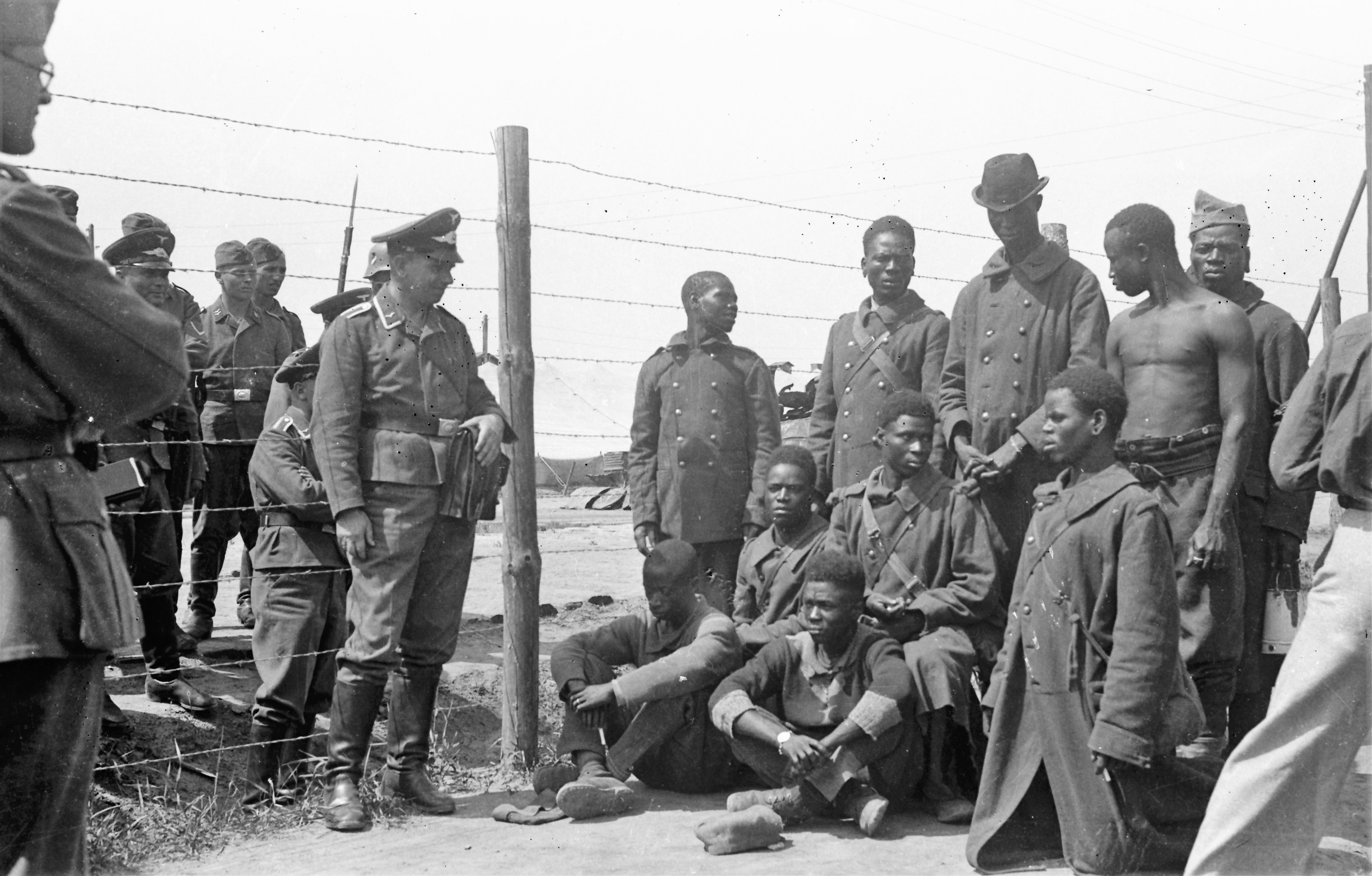
French Senegalese Tirailleurs held as POW by the Germans into Stalag I-B, East Prussia (now Poland), 1944.

After the French armies surrendered in summer 1940, Germany seized two million French prisoners of war and sent them to camps in Germany. About one third were released on various terms. Of the remainder, the officers and non-commissioned officers were kept in camps and did not work. The privates were sent out to work. About half of them worked for German agriculture, where food supplies were adequate and controls were lenient. The others worked in factories or mines, where conditions were much harsher.

===== Western Allies' POWs =====
Germany and Italy generally treated prisoners from the British Empire and Commonwealth, France, the U.S., and other western Allies in accordance with the Geneva Convention, which had been signed by these countries. Consequently, western Allied officers were not usually made to work and some personnel of lower rank were usually compensated, or not required to work either. The main complaints of western Allied prisoners of war in German POW camps—especially during the last two years of the war—concerned shortages of food.

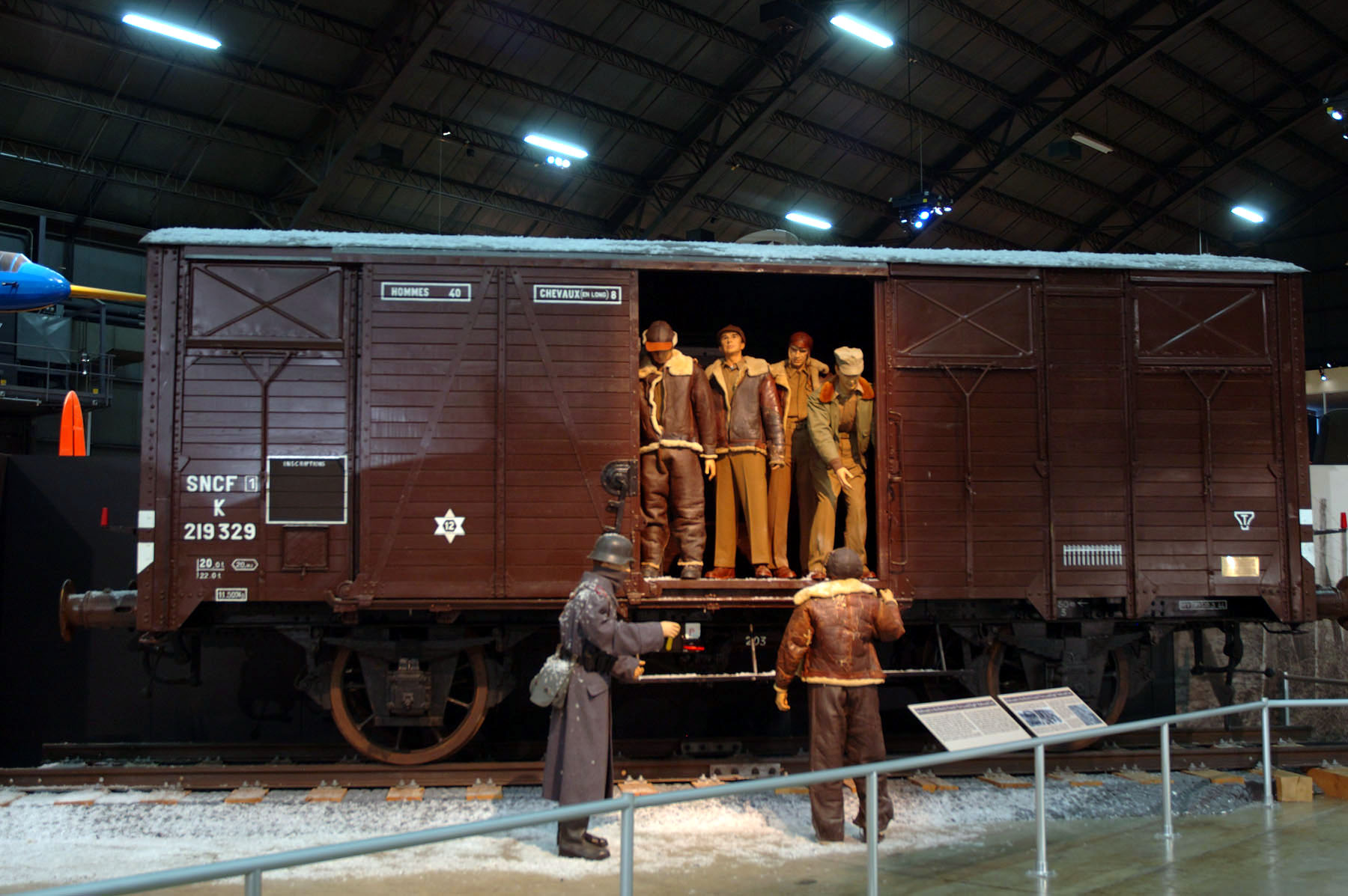
Representation of a "Forty-and-eight" boxcar used to transport American POWs in Germany during World War II

Only a small proportion of western Allied POWs who were Jews—or whom the Nazis believed to be Jewish—were killed as part of the Holocaust or were subjected to other antisemitic policies. For example, Major Yitzhak Ben-Aharon, a Palestinian Jew who had enlisted in the British Army, and who was captured by the Germans in Greece in 1941, experienced four years of captivity under entirely normal conditions for POWs.

A small number of Allied personnel were sent to concentration camps, for a variety of reasons including being Jewish. As the US historian Joseph Robert White put it: "An important exception ... is the sub-camp for U.S. POWs at Berga an der Elster, officially called Arbeitskommando 625 [also known as Stalag IX-B]. Berga was the deadliest work detachment for American captives in Germany. 73 men who participated, or 21 percent of the detachment, perished in two months. 80 of the 350 POWs were Jews." Another well-known example was a group of 168 Australian, British, Canadian, New Zealand and US aviators who were held for two months at Buchenwald concentration camp; two of the POWs died at Buchenwald. Two possible reasons have been suggested for this incident: German authorities wanted to make an example of Terrorflieger ("terror aviators") or these aircrews were classified as spies, because they had been disguised as civilians or enemy soldiers when they were apprehended.

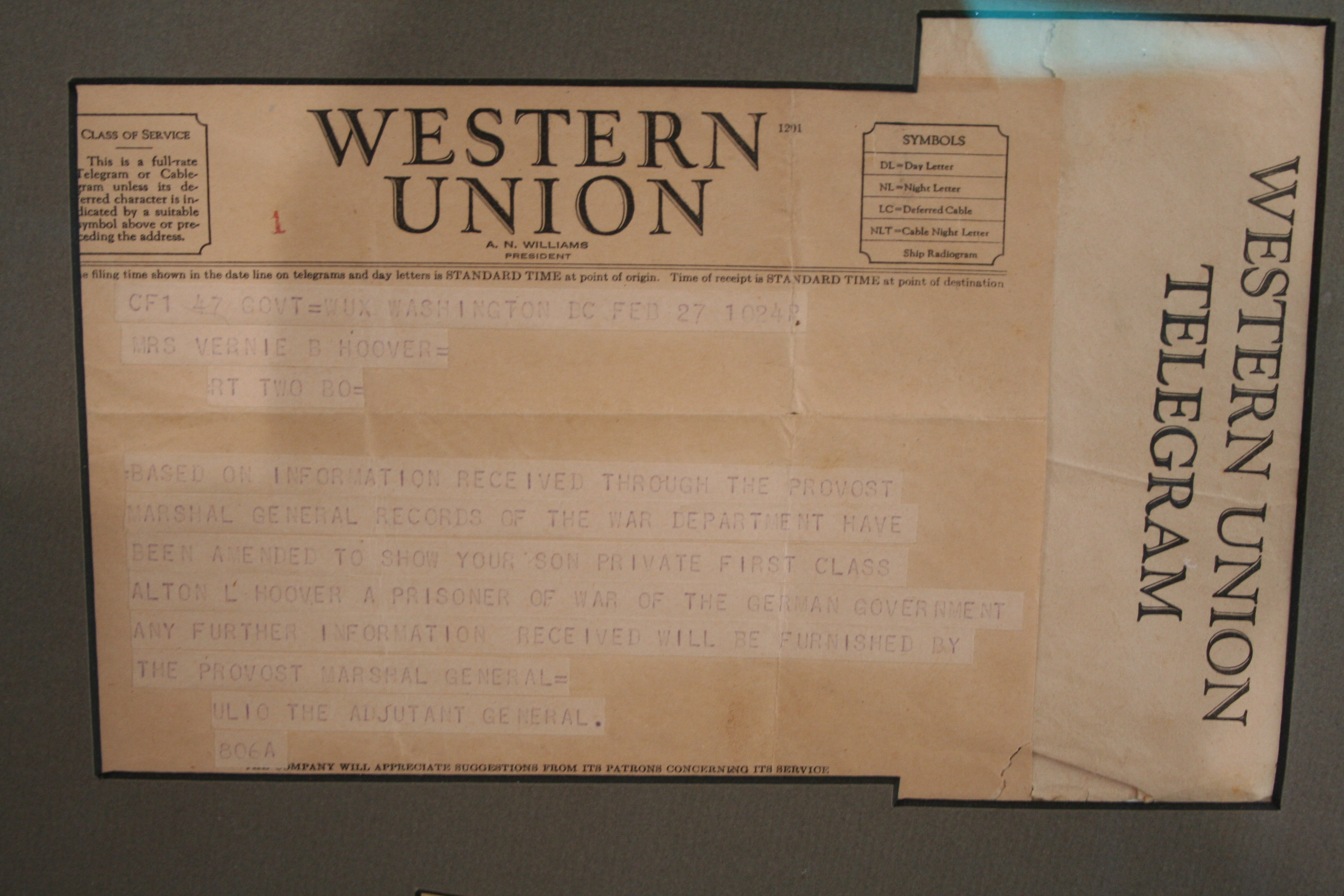
Telegram notifying parents of an American POW of his capture by Germany

Information on conditions in the stalags is contradictory depending on the source. Some American POWs claimed the Germans were victims of circumstance and did the best they could, while others accused their captors of brutalities and forced labour. In any case, the prison camps were miserable places where food rations were meagre and conditions squalid. One American admitted "The only difference between the stalags and concentration camps was that we weren't gassed or shot in the former. I do not recall a single act of compassion or mercy on the part of the Germans." Typical meals consisted of a bread slice and watery potato soup which was still more substantial than what Soviet POWs or concentration camp inmates received. Another prisoner stated that "The German plan was to keep us alive, yet weakened enough that we wouldn't attempt escape."

As the Red Army approached some POW camps in early 1945, German guards forced western Allied POWs to walk long distances towards central Germany, often in extreme winter weather conditions. It is estimated that, out of 257,000 POWs, about 80,000 were subject to such marches and up to 3,500 of them died as a result.

===== Italian POWs =====
In September 1943 after the Armistice, Italian officers and soldiers in many places waiting for orders were arrested by Germans and Italian fascists and taken to internment camps in Germany or Eastern Europe, where they were held for the duration of the war. The International Red Cross could do nothing for them, as they were not regarded as POWs, but the prisoners held the status of "military internees". Treatment of the prisoners was generally poor. The author Giovannino Guareschi was among those interned and wrote about this time in his life. The book was translated and published as My Secret Diary. He wrote about semi-starvation, the casual murder of individual prisoners by guards and how, when they were released (now from a German camp), they found a deserted German town filled with foodstuffs that they (with other released prisoners) ate.. It is estimated that of the 700,000 Italians taken prisoner by the Germans, around 40,000 died in detention and more than 13,000 lost their lives during the transportation from the Greek islands to the mainland.

===== Eastern European POWs =====
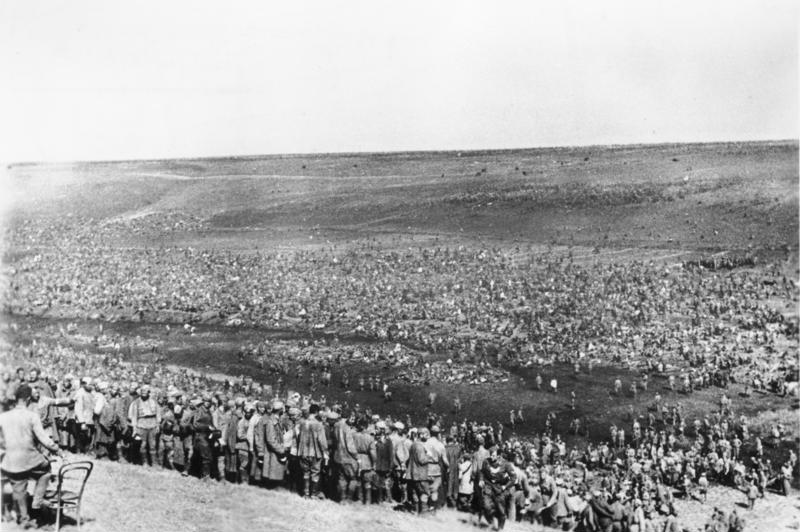
An improvised camp for Soviet POWs. Between June 1941 and January 1942, the Nazis killed an estimated 2.8 million Soviet prisoners of war, whom they viewed as "subhuman".

Between 1941 and 1945 the Axis powers took about 5.7 million Soviet prisoners. About one million of them were released during the war, in that their status changed but they remained under German authority. A little over 500,000 either escaped or were liberated by the Red Army. Some 930,000 more were found alive in camps after the war. The remaining 3.3 million prisoners (57.5% of the total captured) died during their captivity. Between the launching of Operation Barbarossa in the summer of 1941 and the following spring, 2.8 million of the 3.2 million Soviet prisoners taken died while in German hands. According to Russian military historian General Grigoriy Krivosheyev, the Axis powers took 4.6 million Soviet prisoners, of whom 1.8 million were found alive in camps after the war and 318,770 were released by the Axis during the war and were then drafted into the Soviet armed forces again. By comparison, 8,348 Western Allied prisoners died in German camps during 1939–45 (3.5% of the 232,000 total).

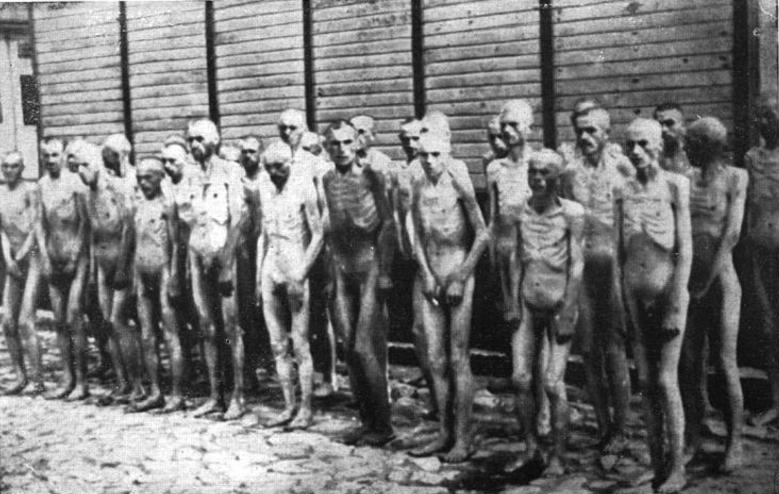
Naked Soviet prisoners of war in Mauthausen concentration camp

The Germans officially justified their policy on the grounds that the Soviet Union had not signed the Geneva Convention. Legally, however, under article 82 of the Geneva Convention, signatory countries had to give POWs of all signatory and non-signatory countries the rights assigned by the convention. Shortly after the German invasion in 1941, the USSR made Berlin an offer of a reciprocal adherence to the Hague Conventions. Third Reich officials left the Soviet "note" unanswered.

==== Romania ====
===== Soviet POWs =====
Between 1941 and 1944, 91,060 Soviet prisoners of war were captured by the Romanian Army. Until August 1944, 5,221 Soviet prisoners died in Romanian camps mainly to disease during winter. The POWs were treated according to the 1929 Geneva Convention, which was ratified by Romania on 15 September 1931. Initially, the prisoners were held in five POW camps in Vulcan, Găești, Drăgășani, Alexandria and Slobozia. By 1942, the number reached 12 camps of which 10 were in Romania, and two in Transnistria at Tiraspol and Odesa. As the frontline moved further away, the captured prisoners were given to German POW camps, and then they were transferred to Romanian ones after requests from the Romanian authorities.

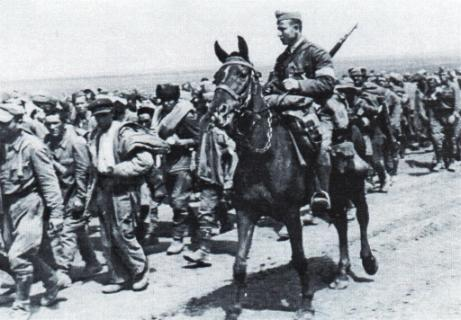
Soviet POWs escorted by a Romanian cavalryman in 1941

In the winter of 1941/1942, the conditions of the POW camps were unsatisfactory, leading to the deaths of prisoners due to various diseases. The conditions were improved in 1942 when, by order of Marshal Ion Antonescu, the organisations leading the camps were to permanently control how the prisoners were accommodated, cared for, fed, and used. Due to some problems that arose with the food allowance in 1942, it was decided that the prisoners were to be fed like the Romanian troops, with an allocated 30 lei per soldier per day.

In accordance with Article 27 of the Geneva Convention, the POWs were used in various productive activities. In return for providing work, the prisoners were granted payment and accommodation, as well as free time for cleaning, rest, and religious or other activities by their employers, according to the contracts signed with the commanders of the prison camps. The main workplaces for prisoners were in agriculture and industrial enterprises, but also in forestry, civil works, and in service of the POW camps.

For correspondence with their families, the prisoners were provided with postcards. However, most of these were not used as the POWs feared reprisals from the Soviet authorities upon learning that they were prisoners in Romania. The punishment of POWs in the Romanian camps was applied following the regulations of the Romanian Army. Executions by firing squad were few. The escapees who were caught and did not commit any acts of sabotage or espionage were tried by court-martial and sentenced to prison terms from 3–6 months to several years. After 23 August 1944, the Soviet POWs were handed over to the Soviet headquarters.

===== Western Allies' POWs =====
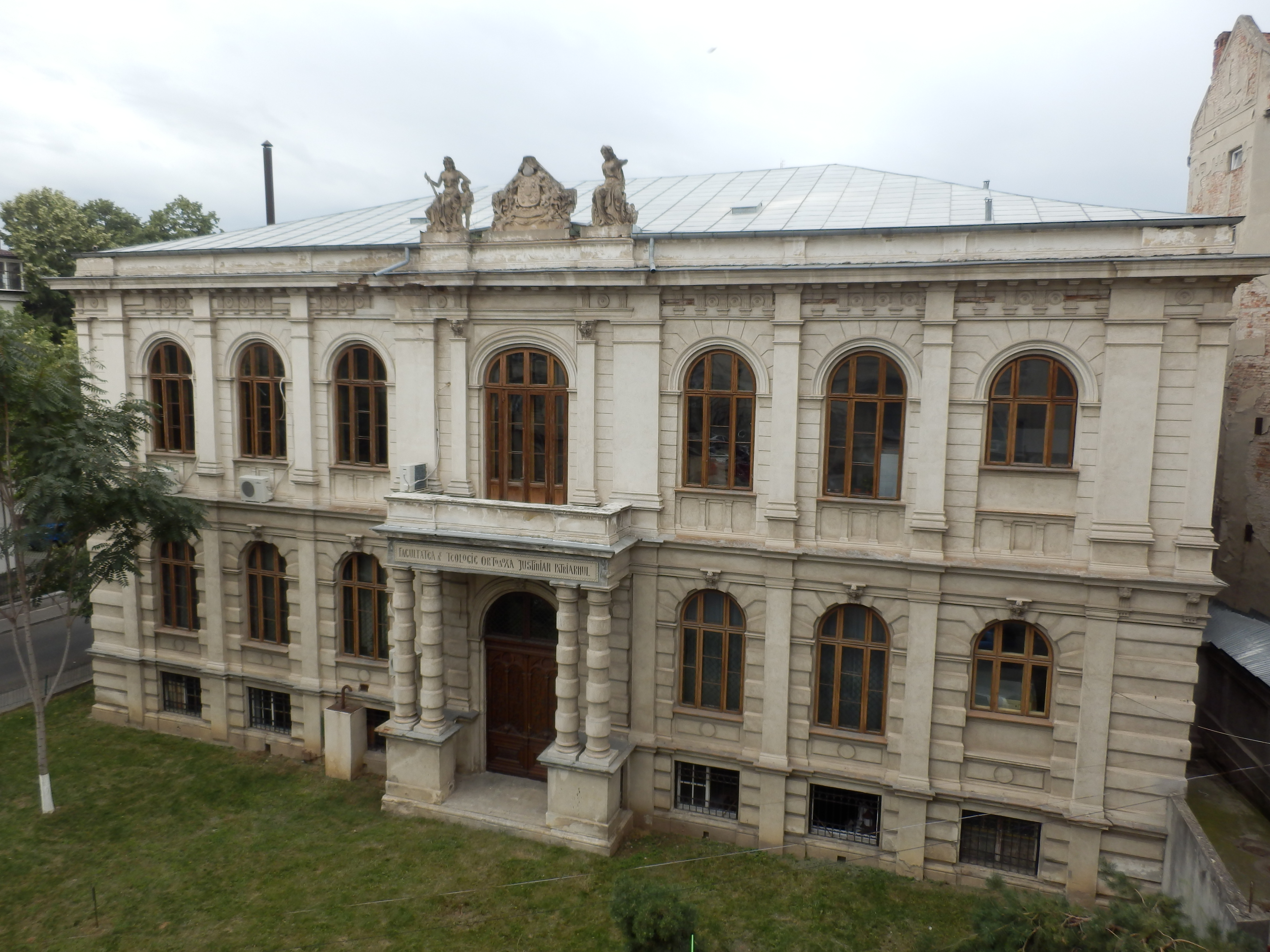
The Bucharest Faculty of Orthodox Theology, the former Normal School used as Camp No. 13 during the war

The first Americans were captured in Romania following Operation Tidal Wave. The airmen were interned at first in the court of the Central Seminary in Bucharest, with the wounded airmen taken to the no. 415 Hospital in Sinaia. After Marshal Antonescu's visits, a new camp was to be set up, and the prisoners were to be treated according to the Geneva Convention. In September, all 110 POWs were transferred to the villas belonging to the Brașov and Giurgiu City Halls at Timișul de Jos, in the newly established Camp No. 14 (Lagărul de prizonieri nr. 14). The excellent living conditions at the camp earned it the nickname "gilded cage", with the prisoners describing it as "probably the best prison camp in the world". The treatment of the Allied POWs was overseen by Princess Catherine Caradja, who was nicknamed "The Angel of Ploiești" by the airmen.

In the spring of 1944, with the increasing number of American and British prisoners due to the restarted air campaign, a new camp was set up in Bucharest. Camp No. 13 from Bucharest was initially located within the barracks of the 6th Guard Regiment "Mihai Viteazul", in a frequently bombed area. It was later moved to the Normal School on St. Ecaterina Street. In June 1944, the non-commissioned officers were transferred to a wing of the "Regina Elisabeta" Military Hospital. After 23 August, at the request of the prisoners to be organised into a military unit, General Mihail Racoviță approved the transfer of 896 POWs to the barracks of the 4th Vânători Regiment. All Western Allied POWs were evacuated to Italy during Operation Reunion from 31 August to 3 September.

=== Treatment of POWs by the Soviet Union ===
==== Germans, Romanians, Italians, Hungarians, Finns ====
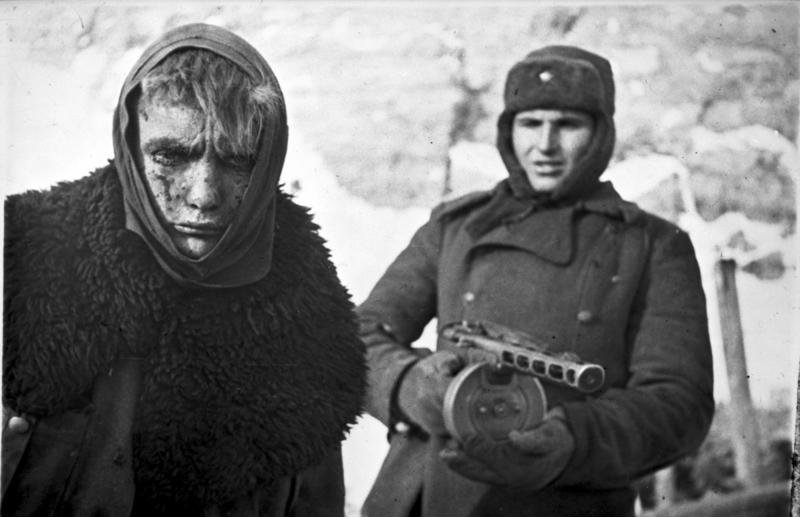
German POW at Stalingrad

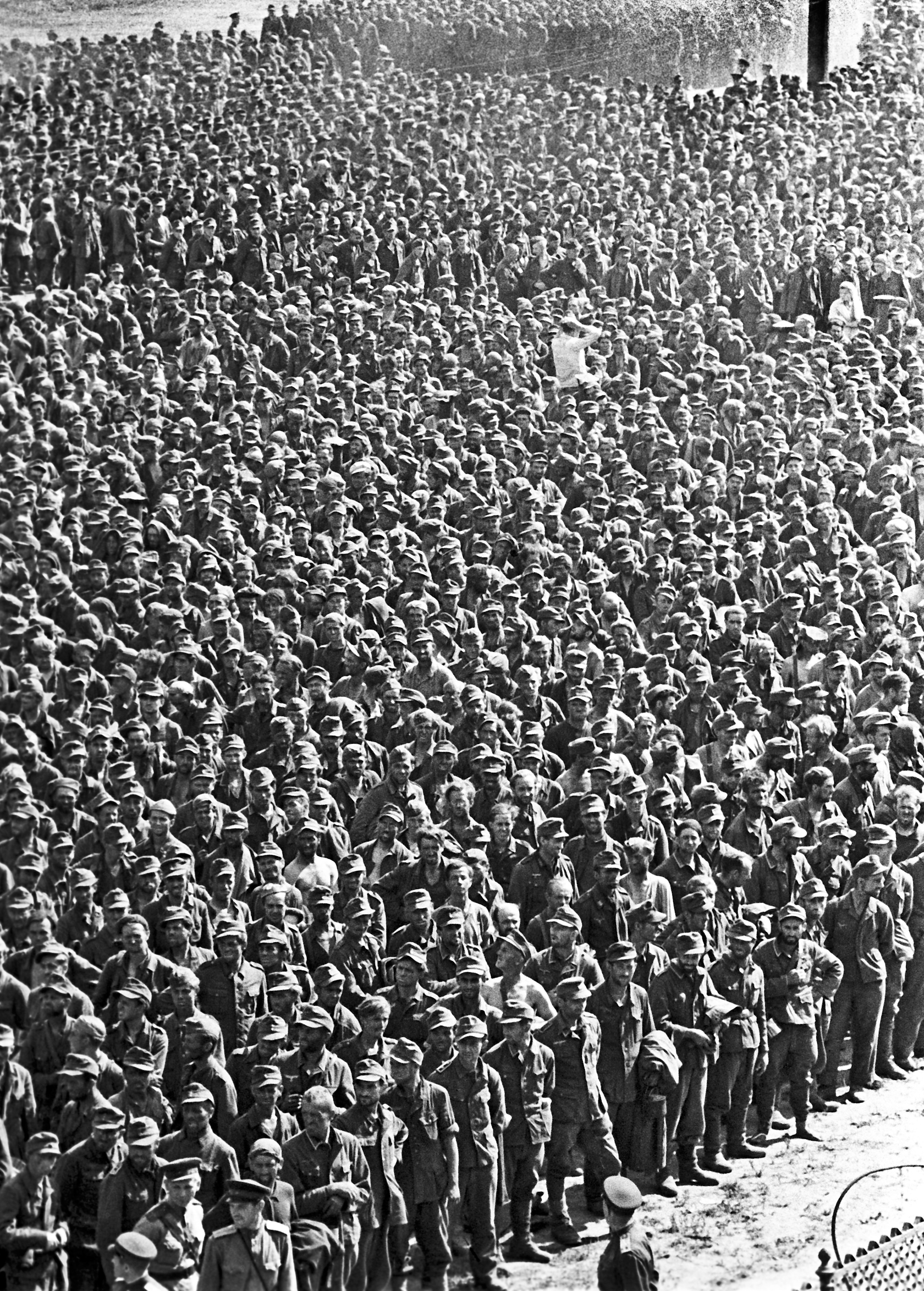
German prisoners of war being paraded through Moscow

According to some sources, the Soviets captured 3.5 million Axis servicemen (excluding Japanese), of whom more than a million died. One specific example is that of the German POWs after the Battle of Stalingrad, where the Soviets captured 91,000 German troops in total (completely exhausted, starving and sick), of whom only 5,000 survived the captivity.

German soldiers were kept as forced labour for many years after the war. The last German POWs like Erich Hartmann, the highest-scoring fighter ace in the history of aerial warfare, who had been declared guilty of war crimes but without due process, were not released by the Soviets until 1955, two years after Stalin died.

==== Polish ====
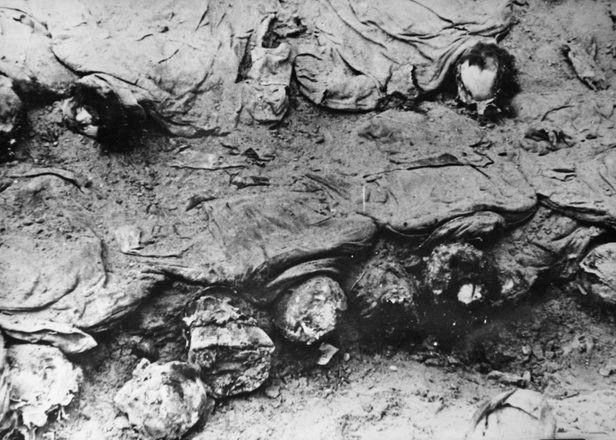
Katyn 1943 exhumation; photo by International Red Cross delegation

As a result of the Soviet invasion of Poland in 1939, hundreds of thousands of Polish soldiers became prisoners of war in the Soviet Union. Thousands were executed; over 20,000 Polish military personnel and civilians perished in the Katyn massacre. Out of Anders' 80,000 evacuees from the Soviet Union to the United Kingdom, only 310 volunteered to return to Poland in 1947.

Of the 230,000 Polish prisoners of war taken by the Soviet army, only 82,000 survived.

==== Japanese ====
After the Soviet–Japanese War, 560,000 to 760,000 Japanese prisoners of war were captured by the Soviet Union. The prisoners were captured in Manchuria, Korea, South Sakhalin and the Kuril Islands, then sent to work as forced labour in the Soviet Union and Mongolia. An estimated 60,000 to 347,000 of these Japanese prisoners of war died in captivity.

==== Americans ====
Stories that circulated during the Cold War claimed 23,000 Americans held in German POW camps had been seized by the Soviets and never been repatriated. The claims had been perpetuated after the release of people like John H. Noble. Careful scholarly studies demonstrated that this was a myth based on the misinterpretation of a telegram about Soviet prisoners held in Italy.

=== Treatment of POWs by the Western Allies ===
==== Germans ====
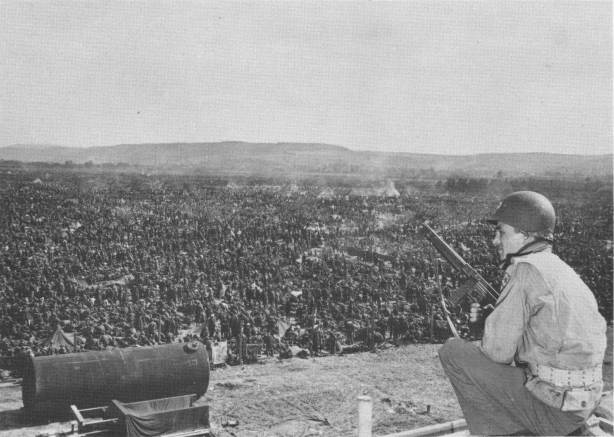
Remagen open-field Rheinwiesenlager

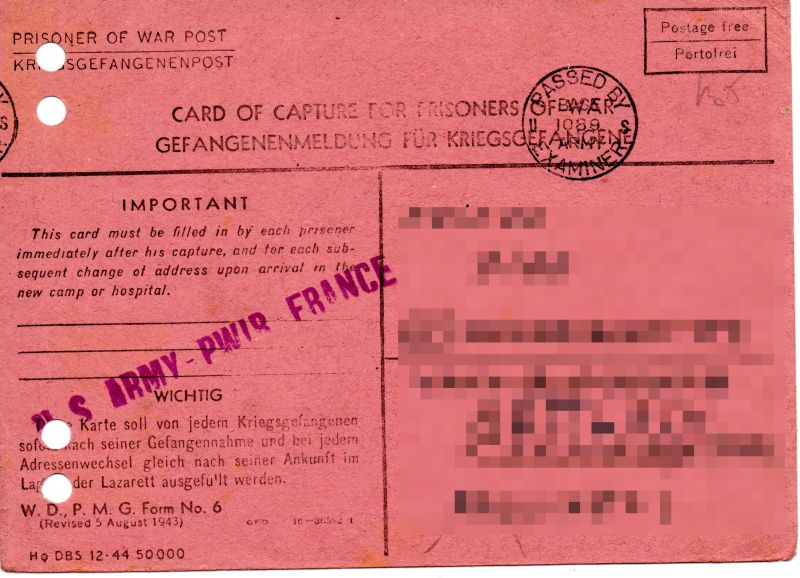
US Army: Card of capture for German POWs – front

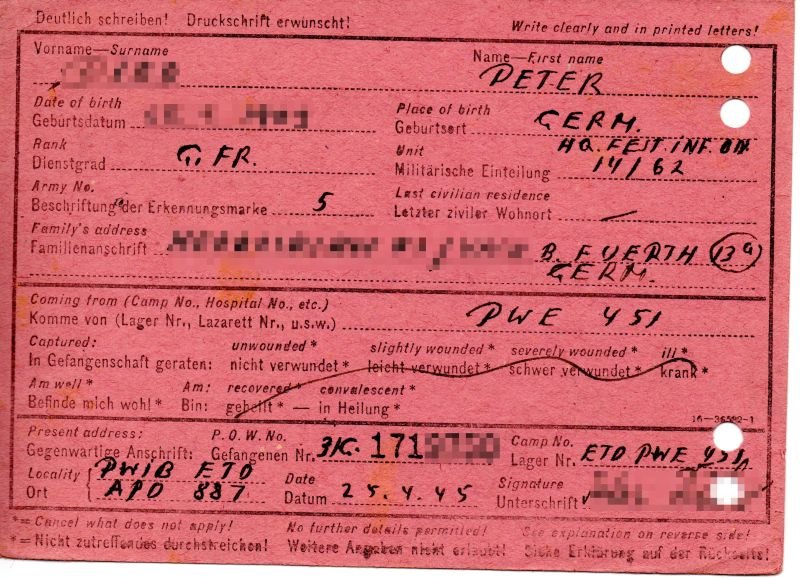
Reverse of US Army Card of capture

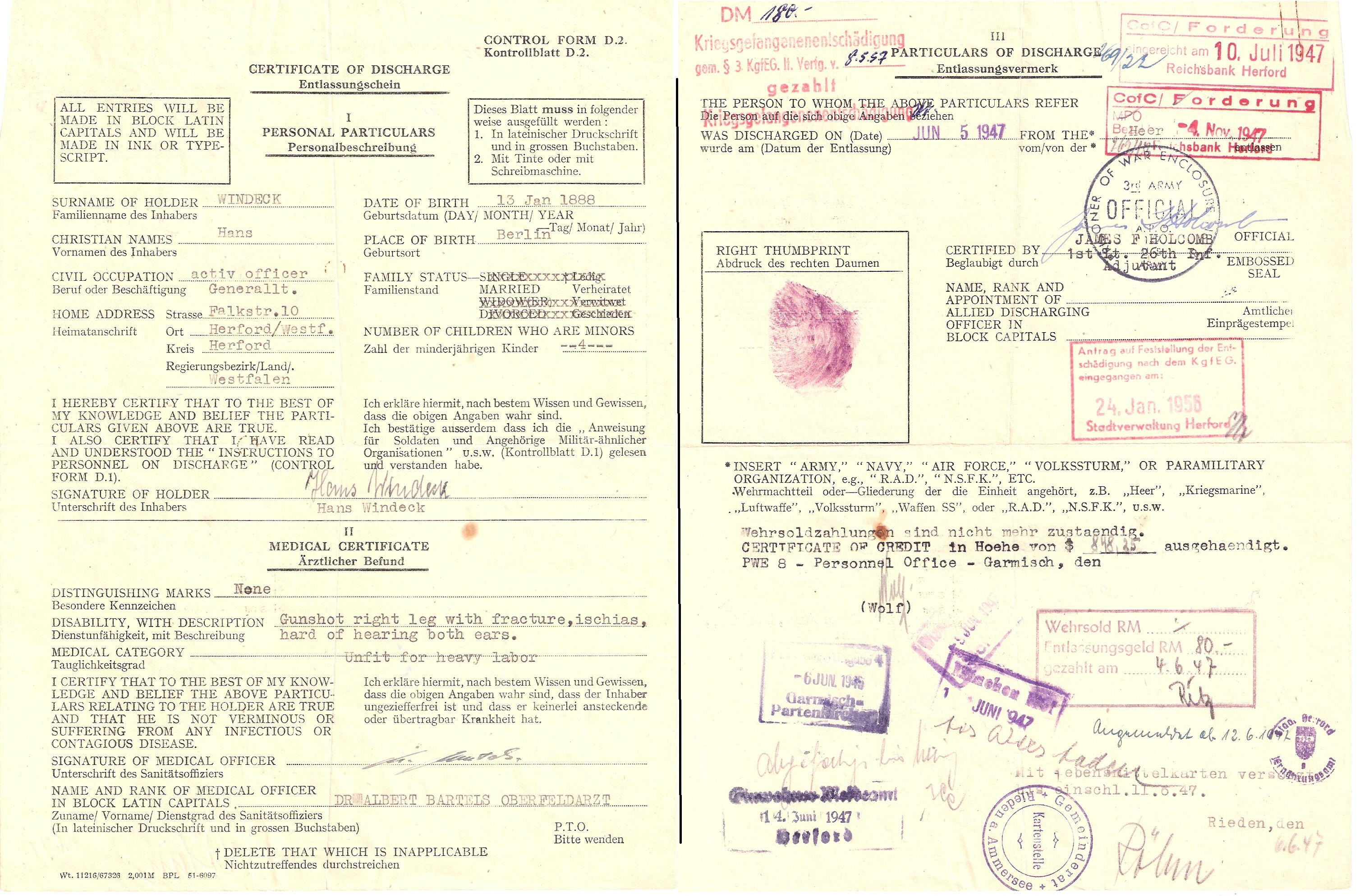
Certificate of Discharge of a German General (Front- and Backside)

During the war, the armies of Western Allied nations such as Australia, Canada, the UK and the US were given orders to treat Axis prisoners strictly in accordance with the Geneva Convention. Some breaches of the Convention took place, however. According to Stephen E. Ambrose, of the roughly 1,000 US combat veterans he had interviewed, only one admitted to shooting a prisoner, saying he "felt remorse, but would do it again". However, one-third of interviewees told him they had seen fellow US troops kill German prisoners.

In Britain, German prisoners, particularly higher-ranked officers, were housed in luxurious buildings where listening devices were installed. A considerable amount of military intelligence was gained from eavesdropping on what the officers believed were private casual conversations. Much of the listening was carried out by German refugees, in many cases Jews. The work of these refugees in contributing to the Allied victory was declassified over half a century later.

In February 1944, 59.7% of POWs in America were employed. This relatively low percentage was due to problems setting wages that would not compete against those of non-prisoners, to union opposition, as well as concerns about security, sabotage, and escape. Given national manpower shortages, citizens and employers resented the idle prisoners, and efforts were made to decentralise the camps and reduce security enough that more prisoners could work. By the end of May 1944, POW employment was at 72.8%, and by late April 1945 it had risen to 91.3%. The sector that made the most use of POW workers was agriculture. There was more demand than supply of prisoners throughout the war, and 14,000 POW repatriations were delayed in 1946 so prisoners could be used in the spring farming seasons, mostly to thin and block sugar beets in the west. While some in Congress wanted to extend POW labour beyond June 1946, President Truman rejected this, leading to the end of the program.

Towards the end of the war in Europe, as large numbers of Axis soldiers surrendered, the US created the designation of Disarmed Enemy Forces (DEF) so as not to treat prisoners as POWs. A lot of these soldiers were kept in open fields in makeshift camps in the Rhine valley (Rheinwiesenlager). Controversy has arisen about how Eisenhower managed these prisoners. (see Other Losses).

After the surrender of Germany in May 1945, the POW status of the German prisoners was in many cases maintained, and they were for several years used as public labourers in countries such as the UK and France. Many died when forced to clear minefields in countries such as Norway and France. "By September 1945 it was estimated by the French authorities that two thousand prisoners were being maimed and killed each month in accidents".

In 1946, the UK held over 400,000 German POWs, many having been transferred from POW camps in the US and Canada. They were employed as labourers to compensate for the lack of manpower in Britain, as a form of war reparation. A public debate ensued in the UK over the treatment of German prisoners of war, with many in Britain comparing the treatment to the POWs to slave labour. In 1947, the Ministry of Agriculture argued against repatriation of working German prisoners, since by then they made up 25 per cent of the land workforce, and it wanted to continue having them work in the UK until 1948.

The "London Cage", an MI19 prisoner of war facility in London used during and immediately after the war to interrogate prisoners before sending them to prison camps, was subject to allegations of torture.

After the German surrender, the International Red Cross was prohibited from providing aid, such as food or prisoner visits, to POW camps in Germany. However, after making appeals to the Allies in the autumn of 1945, the Red Cross was allowed to investigate the camps in the British and French occupation zones of Germany, as well as providing relief to the prisoners held there. On 4 February 1946, the Red Cross was also permitted to visit and assist prisoners in the US occupation zone of Germany, although only with very small quantities of food. "During their visits, the delegates observed that German prisoners of war were often detained in appalling conditions. They drew the attention of the authorities to this fact, and gradually succeeded in getting some improvements made".

POWs were also transferred among the Allies, with for example 6,000 German officers transferred from Western Allied camps to the Soviets and subsequently imprisoned in the Sachsenhausen concentration camp, at the time one of the NKVD special camps. Although the Soviet Union had not signed the Geneva Convention, the U.S. chose to hand over several hundred thousand German prisoners to the Soviet Union in May 1945 as a "gesture of friendship". U.S. forces also refused to accept the surrender of German troops attempting to surrender to them in Saxony and Bohemia, and handed them over to the Soviet Union instead.

The United States handed over 740,000 German prisoners to France, which was a Geneva Convention signatory but which used them as forced labourers. Newspapers reported that the POWs were being mistreated; Judge Robert H. Jackson, chief US prosecutor in the Nuremberg trials, told US President Harry S Truman in October 1945 that the Allies themselves,

have done or are doing some of the very things we are prosecuting the Germans for. The French are so violating the Geneva Convention in the treatment of prisoners of war that our command is taking back prisoners sent to them. We are prosecuting plunder and our Allies are practising it.

==== Hungarians ====
Hungarians became POWs of the Western Allies. Some of these were, like the Germans, used as forced labour in France after the cessation of hostilities. After the war, Hungarian POWs were handed over to the Soviets and transported to the Soviet Union for forced labour. Such forced Hungarian labour by the USSR is often referred to as malenkij robot—little work. András Toma, a Hungarian soldier taken prisoner by the Red Army in 1944, was discovered in a Russian psychiatric hospital in 2000. It is likely that he was the last prisoner of war from World War II to be repatriated.

==== Japanese ====
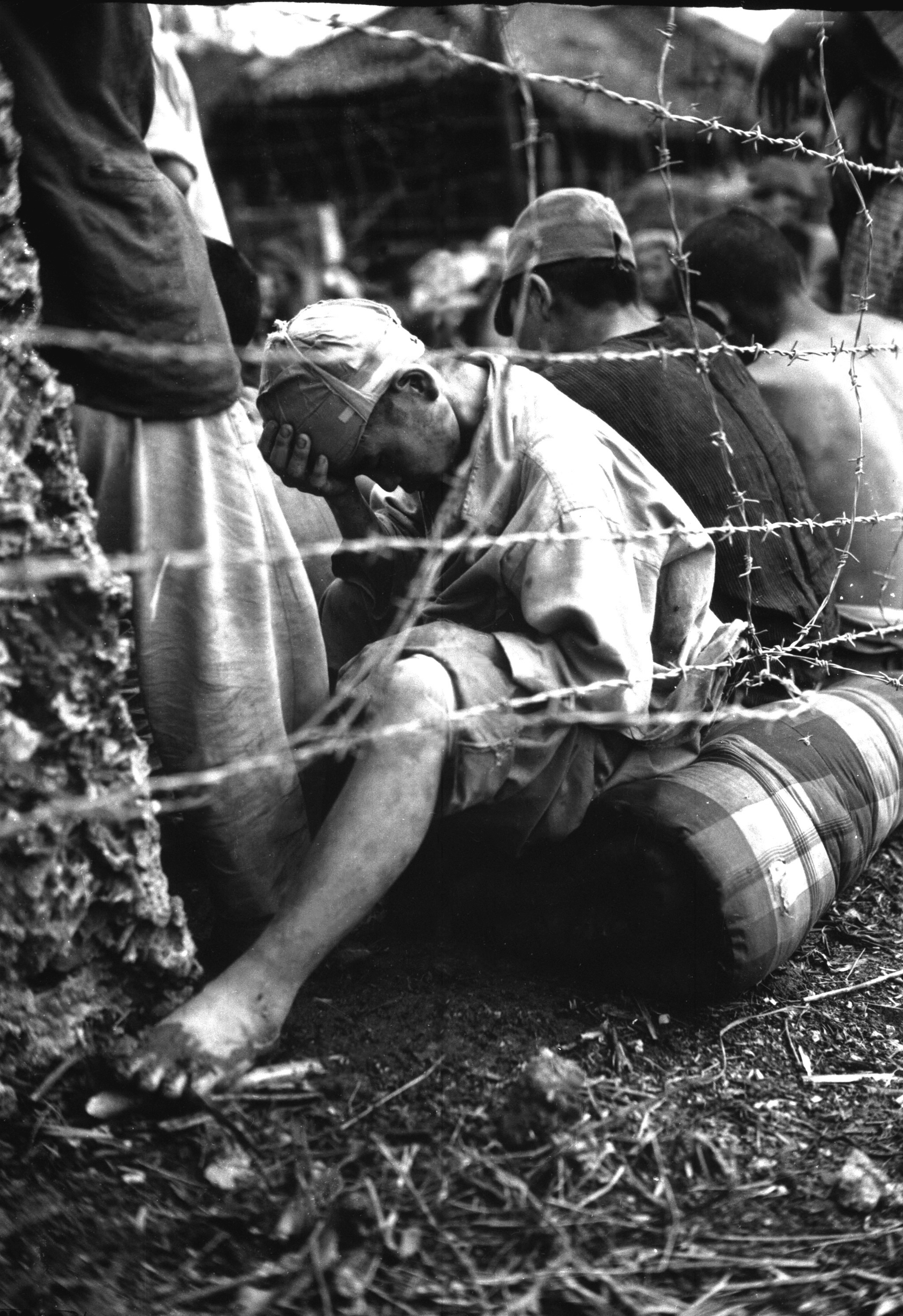
A group of Japanese soldiers captured during the Battle of Okinawa

Although thousands of Japanese servicemembers were taken prisoner of war, most fought until they were killed or committed suicide. Of the 22,000 Japanese soldiers present at the beginning of the Battle of Iwo Jima, over 20,000 were killed and only 216 were taken prisoner of war. Of the 30,000 Japanese troops that defended Saipan, fewer than 1,000 remained alive at battle's end. Japanese prisoners of war sent to camps fared well; however, some were killed when attempting to surrender or were massacred just after doing so (see Allied war crimes during World War II in the Pacific). In some instances, Japanese prisoners of war were tortured through a variety of methods. A method of torture used by the Chinese National Revolutionary Army (NRA) included suspending prisoners by the neck in wooden cages until they died. In very rare cases, some were beheaded by sword, and a severed head was once used as a football by Chinese National Revolutionary Army (NRA) soldiers.

After the war, many Japanese POWs were kept on as Japanese Surrendered Personnel until mid-1947 by the Allies. The JSP were used until 1947 for labour purposes, such as road maintenance, recovering corpses for reburial, cleaning, and preparing farmland. Early tasks also included repairing airfields damaged by Allied bombing during the war and maintaining law and order until the arrival of Allied forces in the region.

==== Italians ====
In 1943, Italy overthrew Mussolini and became an Allied co-belligerent. This did not change the status of many Italian POWs, retained in Australia, the UK and US due to labour shortages.

After Italy surrendered to the Allies and declared war on Germany, the United States initially made plans to send Italian POWs back to fight Germany. Ultimately though, the government decided instead to loosen POW work requirements prohibiting Italian prisoners from carrying out war-related work. About 34,000 Italian POWs were active in 1944 and 1945 on 66 US military installations, performing support roles such as quartermaster, repair, and engineering work as Italian Service Units.

==== Soviet ====
1.7 million Red Army soldiers survived German captivity, some by joining German military and police units. Following the Yalta Conference, the Allies initiated a program of mandatory repatriation for Soviet citizens who had resided in the USSR as of 1 September 1939. 4.2 million Ostarbeiters, Soviet prisoners of war, collaborators and refugees were transferred from both Soviet and Western occupation zones. While most returned voluntarily, Western forces coerced those resisting, mostly collaborators who had been captured in Axis uniform. The latter instances included the British handover of Cossacks in May and June 1945 and the late stage, localized Operation Keelhaul in 1946–1947, targeting remaining military collaborators. During the Cossack 1945 repatriations, the British handed over several thousand combatants and civilians who were not Soviet citizens under the Yalta parameters.

Declassified archives disprove Cold War era claims of immediate, widespread persecution of the returning Soviet POWs. 18% of former POWs were cleared to return home, while officials drafted 65% into the Red Army or labour battalions and transferred 15% (or 225,000) to NKVD filtration camps. Rank-and-file collaborators were processed administratively and sent into exile to special settlements; courts sentenced officers to the Gulag. Top leadership of the Russian Liberation Army and Cossack collaborators were tried and executed for treason. Many returnees faced life-long social stigma.

== Post-World War II ==
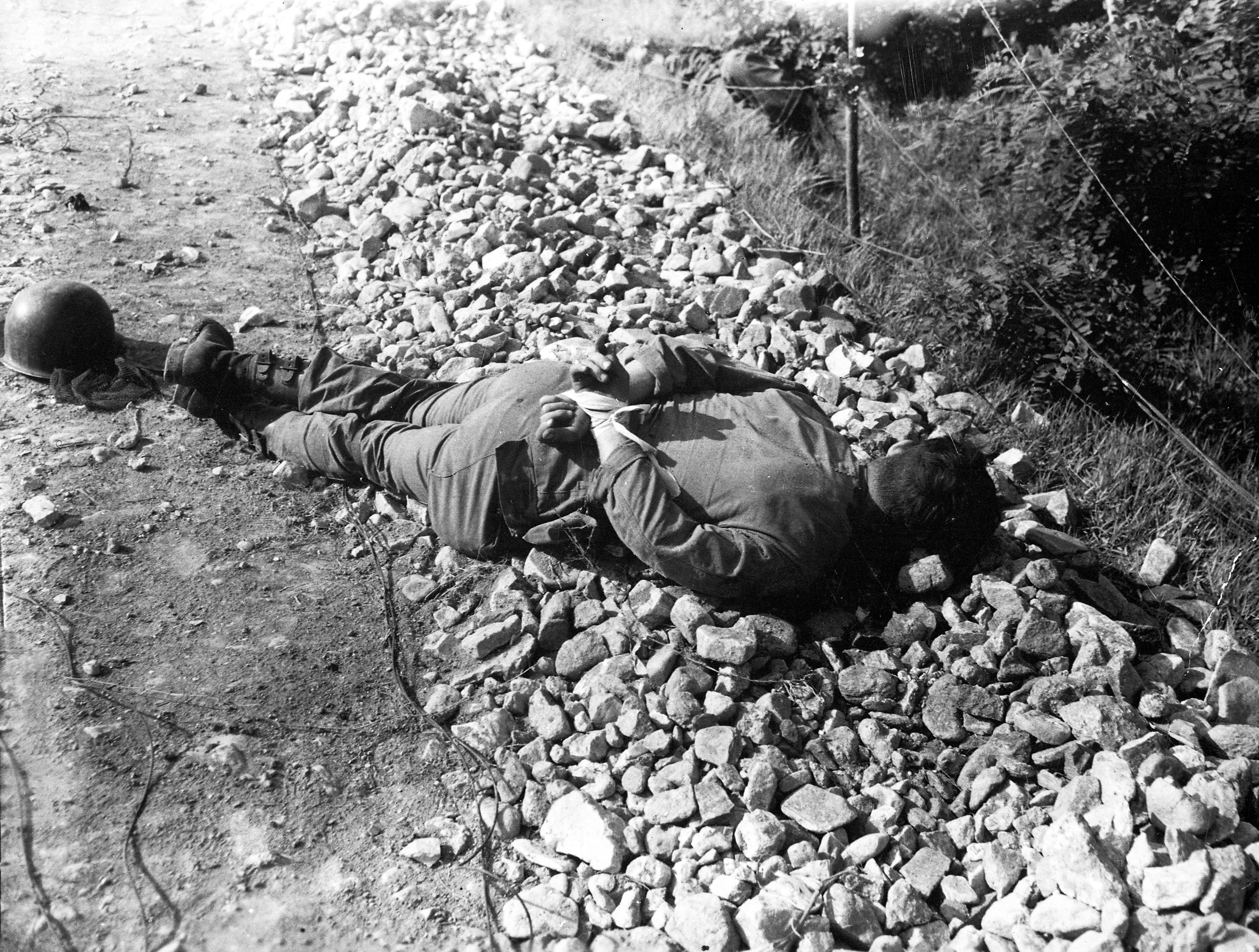
A U.S. Army POW of the 21st Infantry Regiment. bound and killed by North Koreans during the Korean War.

During the Korean War, the North Koreans developed a reputation for torturing and severely mistreating prisoners of war (see Treatment of POWs by North Korean and Chinese forces). Their POWs were housed in three camps, according to their potential usefulness to the North Korean army. Peace camps and reform camps were for POWs that were either sympathetic to the cause or who had valued skills that could be useful to the North Korean military; these enemy soldiers were indoctrinated and sometimes conscripted into the North Korean army. While POWs in peace camps were reportedly treated with more consideration, regular prisoners of war were usually tortured or treated very poorly.

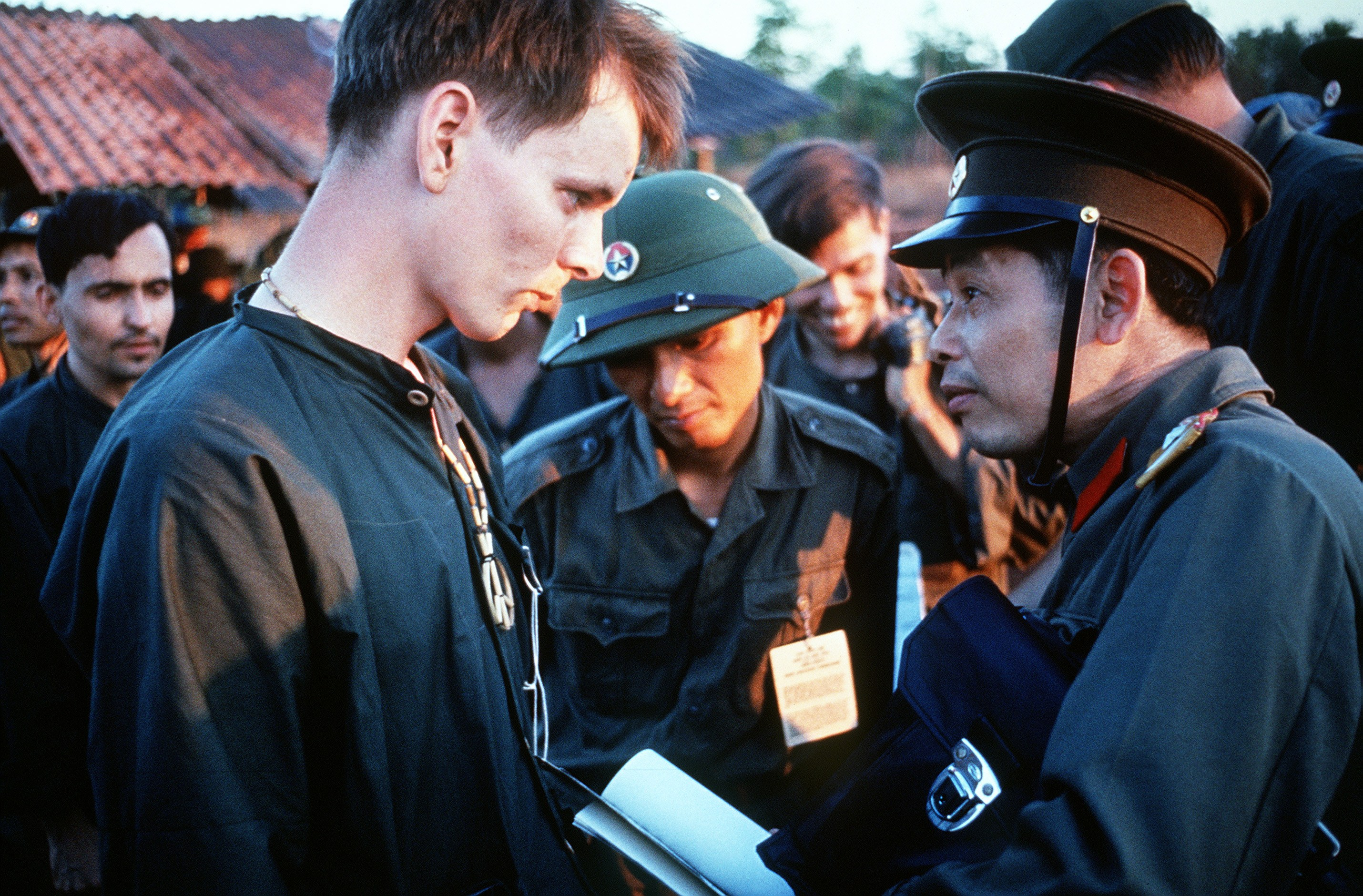
An American POW being released by North Vietnamese and Viet Cong captors in February 1973.

The 1952 Inter-Camp POW Olympics were held from 15 to 27 November 1952 in Pyuktong, North Korea. The Chinese hoped to gain worldwide publicity, and while some prisoners refused to participate, some 500 POWs of eleven nationalities took part. They came from all the North Korean prison camps and competed in football, baseball, softball, basketball, volleyball, track and field, soccer, gymnastics, and boxing. For the POWs, this was also an opportunity to meet with friends from other camps. The prisoners had their own photographers, announcers, and even reporters, who after each day's competition published a newspaper, the "Olympic Roundup".

At the end of the First Indochina War, of the 11,721 French soldiers taken prisoner after the Battle of Dien Bien Phu and led by the Viet Minh on death marches to distant POW camps, only 3,290 were repatriated four months later.

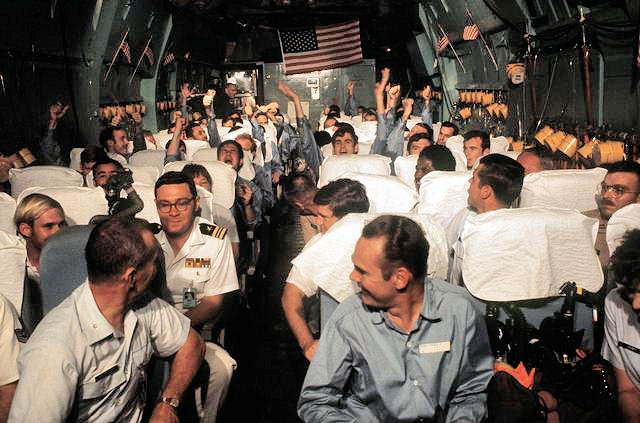
Recently released American POWs from North Vietnamese prison camps in 1973.

During the Vietnam War, the Viet Cong and North Vietnamese Army took many South Vietnamese and United States servicemembers as prisoners of war and subjected them to mistreatment and torture. Some American and South Vietnamese prisoners of war were held in the prison known to US POWs as the Hanoi Hilton. North Vietnamese and Viet Cong held in custody by South Vietnamese and American forces were also tortured and badly treated. After the war, millions of South Vietnamese servicemen and government workers were sent to "re-education" camps, where many perished.

As in previous conflicts, speculation existed, without evidence, that a handful of American pilots captured during the Korean and Vietnam wars were transferred to the Soviet Union and never repatriated.

Regardless of regulations determining treatment of prisoners, violations of their rights continue to be reported. Many cases of POW massacres have been reported in recent times, including the murder of Israeli prisoners of war in the 1973 Yom Kippur War by their Egyptian captors, the 13 October massacre in Lebanon by Syrian forces and June 1990 massacre in Sri Lanka.

Indian intervention in the Bangladesh Liberation War in 1971 led to the third Indo-Pakistan war, which ended in Indian victory and the capture of 93,000 Pakistani POWs, they were later slowly repatriated in a deal with Pakistani President Zulfikar Ali Bhutto.

In 1982, during the Falklands War, prisoners were well-treated in general by both sides, with military commanders dispatching enemy prisoners back to their homelands in record time following the end of the war.

In 1991, during the Gulf War, American, British, Italian, and Kuwaiti POWs (mostly crew members of downed aircraft and special forces) were tortured by the Iraqi secret police. An American military doctor, Major Rhonda Cornum, a 37-year-old flight surgeon captured when her Blackhawk UH-60 was shot down, was also subjected to sexual abuse.

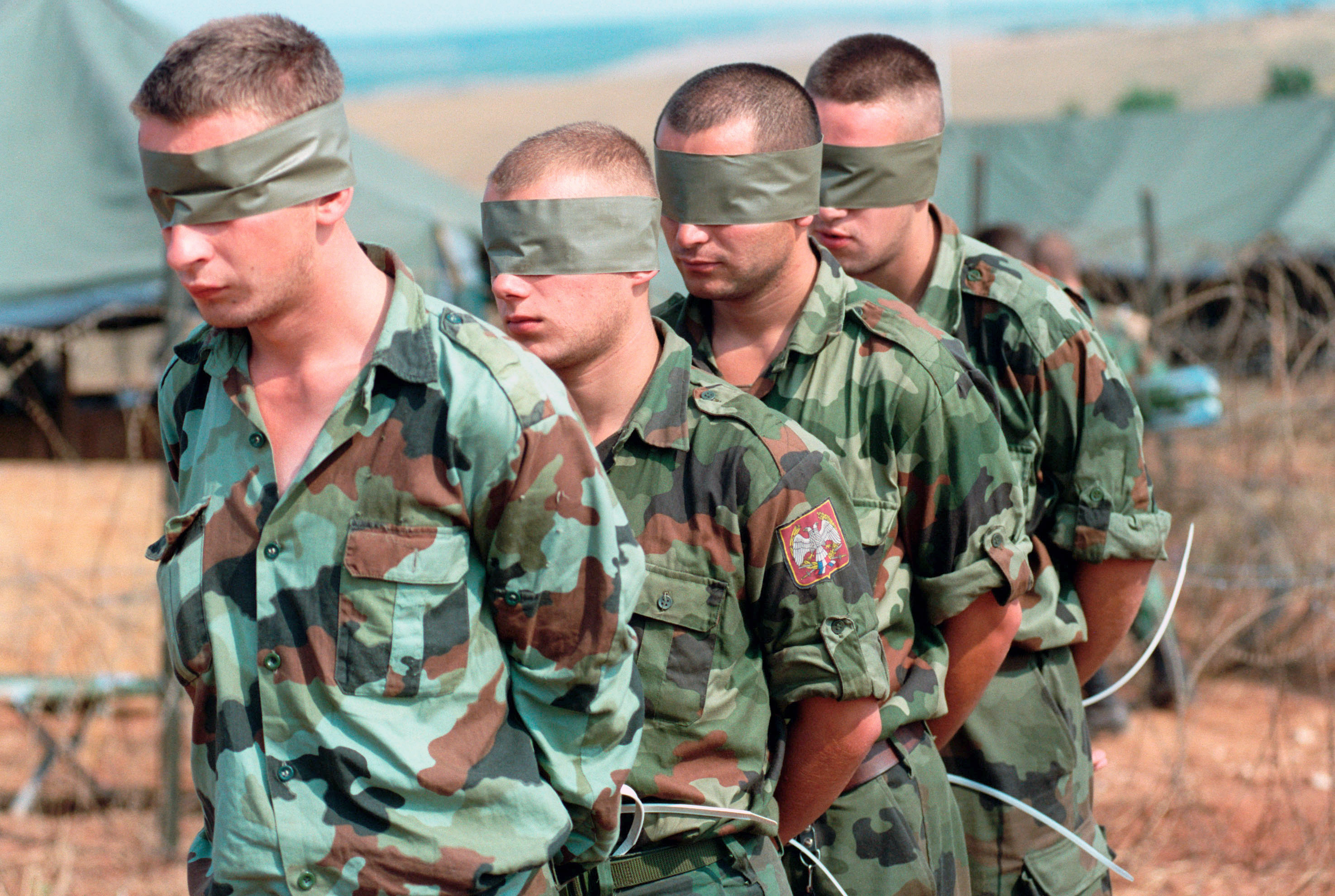
Yugoslav POWs during the Kosovo War in 1999.

During the Yugoslav Wars in the 1990s, Serb paramilitary forces supported by JNA forces killed POWs at Vukovar and Škarbrnja, while Bosnian Serb forces killed POWs at Srebrenica. A large number of surviving Croatian or Bosnian POWs described the conditions in Serbian concentration camps as similar to those in Germany in World War II, including regular beatings, torture and random executions.

In 2001, reports emerged concerning two POWs that India had taken during the Sino-Indian War, Yang Chen and Shih Liang. The two were imprisoned as spies for three years before being interned in a mental asylum in Ranchi, where they spent the following 38 years under a special prisoner status.

The last prisoners of the 1980–1988 Iran–Iraq War were exchanged in 2003.

During the Russo-Georgian War of August 2008, several Georgian military personnel were taken captive by Russian and South Ossetian forces, subjected to systemic torture, and in some cases, extrajudicial execution. The precise moment state responsibility begins during a conflict remained a key point of legal development. In the 2026 case Malachini and Others v. Russia, the European Court of Human Rights ruled that while fluid battlefield chaos might initially complicate state jurisdiction, the physical custody of captives strictly triggered a state's extraterritorial jurisdiction. The Court emphasized that because prisoners of war enjoy special protections under international humanitarian law, the capturing state is held fully liable for their lives and well-being from the exact moment of detention, even if active combat operations are ongoing nearby.

During the Russo-Ukrainian war, Ukrainian POWs have described being tortured by Russian forces using electrocution, beatings, and sexual abuse. Both sides of the conflict forced prisoners to be naked at times as a humiliating punishment. According to the Israeli human rights group B'tselem, since the outbreak of the Gaza war in October 2023, the abuse of Palestinian detainees has become so institutionalized that the prisons should be called 'torture camps'.

== Numbers of POWs ==
This section lists nations with the highest number of POWs since the start of World War II and ranked by descending order. These are also the highest numbers in any war since the Convention Relative to the Treatment of Prisoners of War entered into force on 19 June 1931. The USSR had not signed the Geneva Convention.

Army	Number of POWs held in captivity	War
Nazi Germany	About 3 million taken by USSR (474,967 died in captivity (>15%)) Historian Rüdiger Overmans maintains that it seems entirely plausible, while not provable, that one million died in Soviet custody. He also believes that there were men who actually died as POWs among those listed as missing-in-action.; Unknown number in Yugoslavia, Poland, Netherlands, Belgium, Denmark (the death rate for German prisoners of war was highest in Yugoslavia with over 50%); Over 4.5 million taken by the Western Allies before the formal surrender of Germany, another three million after the surrender (Note: see references on the pages Western Front (World War II) and North African Campaign (World War II)); 1.3 million unknown	World War II
Soviet Union	5.7 million taken by Germany (about 3 million died in captivity (56–68%))	World War II (total)
France	1,800,000 taken by Germany	World War II
Republic of China	1,000,000+ taken by Japan (Note: Including civilian forced laborers held in the prisoner-of-war camps)	World War II
Poland	675,000 (420,000 taken by Germany; 240,000 taken by the Soviets in 1939; 15,000 taken by Germany in Warsaw in 1944)	World War II
United Kingdom	≈200,000 (135,000 taken in Europe, does not include Pacific or Commonwealth figures)	World War II
Iraq	≈175,000 taken by Coalition of the Gulf War	Persian Gulf War
Kingdom of Italy	114,861 lost or captured by US and UK; 60,000 captured by Soviet Union	World War II
United States	≈130,000 (95,532 taken by Germany)	World War II
Empire of Japan	16,000–50,000 captured by Western Allies; 560,000–760,000 captured by the Soviet Union, of them, it is estimated that between 60,000 and 347,000 died in captivity	World War II
Pakistan	93,000 Prisoners of wars captured by Indian Army in India–Pakistan war of 1971, later released.; The surrender was the largest since the end of World War	India–Pakistan war of 1971

== In popular culture ==
=== Films and television ===
- 1971
- Andersonville
- Another Time, Another Place
- As Far as My Feet Will Carry Me
- Blood Oath
- The Bridge on the River Kwai
- Brothers (2004)
- Brothers (2009)
- The Brylcreem Boys
- The Colditz Story
- Danger Within
- The Deer Hunter
- Empire of the Sun
- Escape from Sobibor
- Escape to Athena
- Escape to Victory
- Faith of My Fathers
- Grand Illusion
- The Great Escape
- The Great Raid
- Hanoi Hilton
- Hart's War
- Hogan's Heroes
- Homeland
- Land of Mine
- Katyń
- King Rat
- The McKenzie Break
- Merry Christmas, Mr. Lawrence
- Missing in Action
- The One That Got Away
- P.O.W.- Bandi Yuddh Ke
- The Password is Courage
- Paradise Road
- The Pianist
- Prisoner of the Mountains
- The Purple Heart
- The Railway Man
- Rambo: First Blood Part II
- Rescue Dawn
- The Report
- Slaughterhouse Five
- Some Kind of Hero
- Stalag 17
- Summer of My German Soldier
- T-34
- Tea with Mussolini
- Tenko
- Three Came Home
- To End All Wars
- Unbroken
- Uncommon Valor
- Von Ryan's Express
- The Walking Dead
- Who Goes Next?
- The Wooden Horse

== See also ==
- Prisoner-of-war camp
- 13th Psychological Operations Battalion
- 1952 POW olympics
- Armenian prisoners of the Second Nagorno-Karabakh War
- Camps for Russian prisoners and internees in Poland (1919–1924)
- Civilian Internee
- Coming home to liberated France (World War II)
- Duty to escape
- Elsa Brändström
- German atrocities committed against Soviet prisoners of war
- German prisoners of war in the United States
- Guantanamo Bay detention camp
- Islamic views on prisoners of war
- Korean War POWs detained in North Korea
- Laws of war
- List of notable prisoners of war
- List of prisoner-of-war escapes
- Medal for civilian prisoners, deportees and hostages of the 1914–1918 Great War
- Military Chaplain#Noncombatant status
- Prisoner of war mail
- Rule of Law in Armed Conflicts Project (RULAC)
- Unlawful combatant
- Vietnam War POW/MIA issue
- World War II Radio Heroes: Letters of Compassion
