= List of prisoner-of-war camps in Allied-occupied Germany =

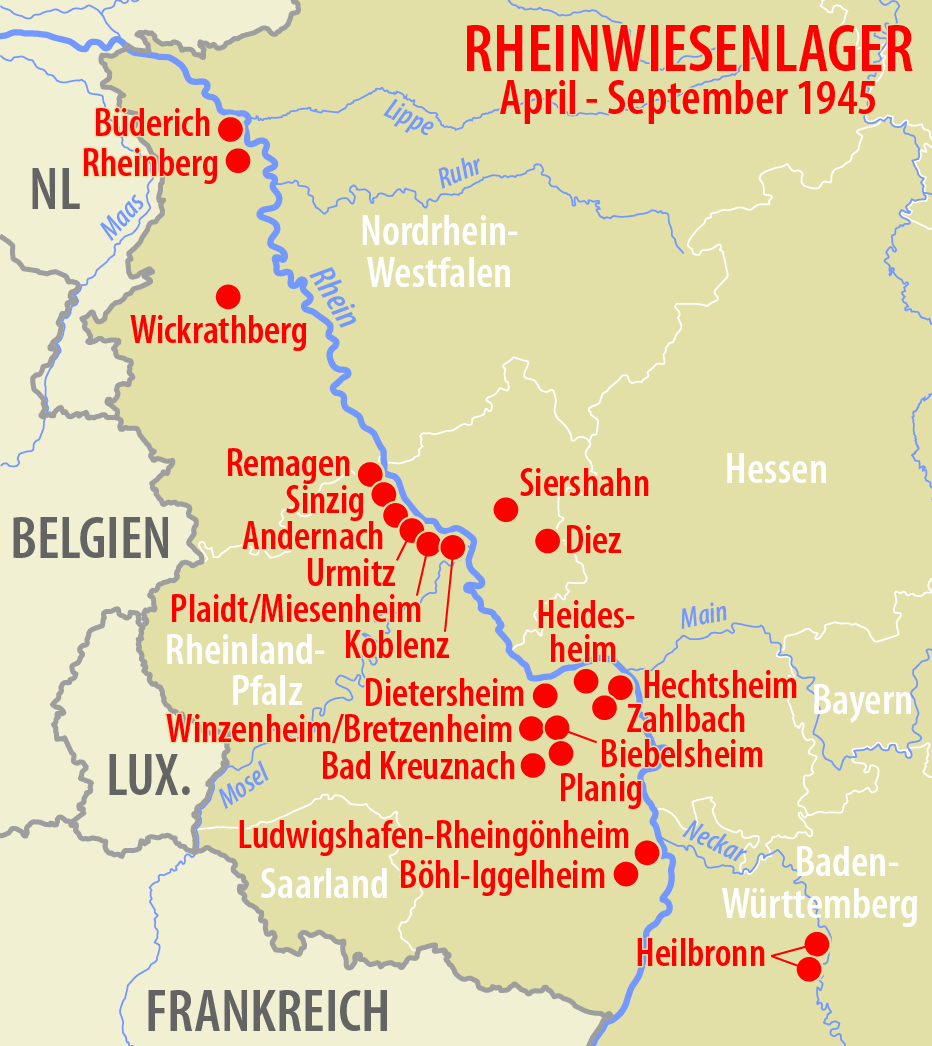
The Rheinwiesenlager camps

Following is the list of 19 prisoner-of-war camps set up in Allied-occupied Germany at the End of World War II in Europe to hold the Nazi German prisoners of war captured across Northwestern Europe by the Allies of World War II. Officially named Prisoner of War Temporary Enclosures (PWTE), they held between one and two million Nazi German military personnel from April until September 1945.

Prisoners held in the Allied camps were designated Disarmed Enemy Forces, not the Prisoners of War. This specific designation was introduced in March 1943 by SHAEF commander in chief Dwight D. Eisenhower in order to conform with the logistics of the Geneva Convention.

== Camps of the U.S. Army ==
The Rheinwiesenlager camps are listed from north to south. Most of them were located near villages on the western side of the river Rhine.

Town	Federal state	Period	Notes
Büderich	North Rhine-Westphalia	April - June 1945	
Rheinberg	North Rhine-Westphalia	April/June - September 1945	
Wickrathberg	North Rhine-Westphalia	April/June - September 1945	
Remagen	Rhineland-Palatinate	April - June 1945	
Sinzig	Rhineland-Palatinate	April/June - September 1945	women's section
Siershahn	Rhineland-Palatinate	April/June - September 1945	
Andernach	Rhineland-Palatinate	April/June - September 1945	
Diez	Rhineland-Palatinate	April/June - September 1945	
Urmitz	Rhineland-Palatinate	April/June - September 1945	
Koblenz	Rhineland-Palatinate	April/June - September 1945	
Heidesheim	Rhineland-Palatinate	April/June - September 1945	
Winzenheim / Bretzenheim	Rhineland-Palatinate	April/June - September 1945	camp for Waffen SS, later French transit camp - 1948
Hechtsheim	Rhineland-Palatinate	April/June - September 1945	
Biebelsheim	Rhineland-Palatinate	April/June - September 1945	
Bad Kreuznach	Rhineland-Palatinate	April/June - September 1945	
Dietersheim	Rhineland-Palatinate	April/June - September 1945	
Ludwigshafen	Rhineland-Palatinate	April/June - September 1945	
Böhl-Iggelheim	Rhineland-Palatinate	April - June 1945	April/June - September 1945
Heilbronn	Baden-Württemberg	April/June - September 1945	
