= Other Losses =

Book by James Bacque

Other Losses: An Investigation into the Mass Deaths of German Prisoners at the Hands of the French and Americans after World War II
- Author: James Bacque
- Language: English
- Subject: Treatment of German POWs by the Western Allies
- Genre: Non-fiction
- Publisher: Stoddart
- Publication date: 1989
- ISBN: 0-7737-2269-6

Other Losses is a 1989 book by Canadian writer James Bacque, which claims that U.S. General Dwight D. Eisenhower intentionally caused the deaths by starvation or exposure of around a million German prisoners of war held in Western internment camps after the Second World War. Other Losses charges that hundreds of thousands of German prisoners that had fled the Eastern front were designated as "Disarmed Enemy Forces" in order to avoid recognition under the Geneva Convention (1929), for the purpose of carrying out their deaths through disease or slow starvation. Other Losses cites documents in the U.S. National Archives and interviews with people who stated they witnessed the events. The book claims that a "method of genocide" was present in the banning of Red Cross inspectors, the returning of food aid, soldier ration policy, and policy regarding shelter building.

Stephen Ambrose, a historian enlisted by the Eisenhower Center for American Studies in 1990 in efforts to preserve Eisenhower's legacy and counteract criticisms of his presidency, and seven other American historians examined the book soon after its publication and concluded that it was inaccurate and pseudohistory. Other historians, including the former senior historian of the United States Army Center of Military History, Colonel Ernest F. Fisher, who was involved in the 1945 investigations into the allegations of misconduct by U.S. troops in Germany and who wrote the book's foreword, argue that the claims are accurate.

== Content ==
=== The "other losses" statistic ===
The title of Other Losses derives from a column of figures in weekly U.S. Army reports that Bacque states actually reflects a body count of German prisoners that died of slow starvation or diseases. The book states that Colonel Philip Lauben, chief of German Affairs Branch at SHAEF (Supreme Headquarters Allied Expeditionary Force), confirmed that "other losses" meant deaths and escapes, with escapes being a minor part. This is supported by a US Army document lodged in the US National Archives which "plainly states" that the "other losses" category of prisoners was for deaths and escapes. Bacque dismisses claims from his opponents that "other losses" meant transfers or discharges, as these are accounted for in other columns in the same tables. Furthermore, there is no separate column in which deaths were recorded.

The book refers to the Army Chief Historians report that was published in 1947; in the 20 pages dealing with the capture, transfer and discharge of prisoners, the report makes no mention of releasing prisoners without formal discharge. Furthermore, Bacque cites Army orders from General Eisenhower himself (Disbandment Directive No. 1) stating that every prisoner leaving captivity had to have discharge papers.

=== Disarmed Enemy Forces designation ===
Other Losses states that Eisenhower sought to sidestep the requirements of the Geneva Convention through the designation of these prisoners as Disarmed Enemy Forces (DEF), specifically stating that "in March, as Germany was being cracked ... a message was being signed and initialed by Eisenhower proposed a startling departure from the Geneva Convention (GC)—the creation of a new class of prisoners who would not be fed by the Army after the surrender of Germany."

The book states that, against the orders of his superiors, Eisenhower took 2 million additional prisoners after Germany's surrender that fell under the DEF designation. According to the book, a million of those who died had fled the Eastern front and most likely ended up in Rheinwiesenlager prisoner transit camps run by the United States and French forces where many such prisoners died of disease or starvation under the cover of the DEF designation.

The book cites orders from Eisenhower which stipulated that the Germans would be solely responsible for feeding and maintaining the DEFs, however, he then prevented any aid from reaching them.

=== Body count of German prisoners ===
Other Losses contends that nearly one million German prisoners died while being held by the United States and French forces at the end of World War II. Specifically, it states: "The victims undoubtedly number over 800,000, almost certainly over 900,000 and quite likely over a million. Their deaths were knowingly caused by army officers who had sufficient resources to keep the prisoners alive."

Other Losses contains an analysis of a medical record that it states supports the conclusion of a prisoner death rate of 30%. Bacque also referred to a 1950 report from the German Red Cross which stated that 1.5 million former German POWs were still officially listed as missing, fate unknown.

The book comments that approximately 15% of the deaths in the U.S. camps were from starvation or dehydration and that most deaths were caused by dysentery, pneumonia, or septicaemia, as a result of the unsanitary conditions and lack of medicine. Further, it states that officers from the U.S. Army Medical Corps reported death rates far higher than they had ever seen before.

The book states that Eisenhower's staff were complicit in the scheme, and that in order to carry out such a scheme, Eisenhower kept these prisoners in camps far longer than was necessary It states that, by the end of 1945, only 40% of prisoners had been released. Other Losses further characterizes the 22-volume German Maschke Commission report investigating the deaths of German prisoners as written by "client-academics" as part of a "cover-up" of the supposed deaths.

=== Treatment of prisoners ===
Other Losses states that the U.S. dismantled the German welfare agencies, including the German Red Cross, then dismissed the Swiss Government from its role as Protecting Power. No agencies were allowed to visit the camps or provide any assistance to the prisoners, including delegates from ICRC (International Committee of the Red Cross), which was a violation of the Geneva Convention. It further states that the only notable protest against this was from William Lyon Mackenzie King, Prime Minister of Canada.

Bacque comments that the press was also prevented from visiting the camps, and therefore was unable to report on the state of the camps and the condition of the prisoners.

The book states that many of the U.S. camps consisted of open fields surrounded by barbed wire, with no shelter or toilet facilities. In these camps prisoners were forced to sleep on the ground in the open, though it claims the U.S. Army had plenty of surplus shelter supplies which could have been issued. No supplies such as blankets were supplied to the prisoners, even though these were in good supply at various locations such as the depot at Naples. In a letter, General Everett Hughes stated that there were "more stocks than we can ever use; stretch as far as eye can see."

The book quotes Dr. Konrad Adenauer (later Chancellor of Germany) stating that "The German prisoners have been penned up for weeks without any protection from the weather, without drinking water, without medical care. They are being held in a manner contrary to all humanitarian principles and flagrantly contrary to the Hague and Geneva Conventions."

Both J. P. Pradervand (ICRC French Delegation) and Henry Dunning (American Red Cross) sent letters to the State Department condemning the poor treatment of the German prisoners. Colonel Philip Lauben stated that "The Vosges was just one big death camp."

=== Prisoner totals ===
According to Other Losses, the U.S. Army employed a number of methods to reduce the number of prisoners officially on hand. One method was to accuse the Russians of taking far more prisoners than they reported. Another was the "midnight shift", whereby the opening balance of a given week was less than the closing balance of the previous week.

The book describes that a "Missing Million" prisoners exist in the difference in totals between two U.S. army reports (the last of the daily reports and the first of the weekly reports) issued on June 2, 1945. As a consequence of this, according to Quartermaster's reports the number of rations issued to the camps was reduced by 900,000.

Other Losses states that after visiting many of the camps in August 1945, Major General Robert M. Littlejohn (Quartermaster of the ETO) concluded that the U.S. Army was reporting 3.7 million prisoners while it actually possessed 5.2 million, thereby corroborating the conclusions made in a report three months earlier from Lieutenant General John C. H. Lee (in charge of logistics for the ETO), which he had sent to SHAEF headquarters. Other Losses states that Littlejohn subsequently wrote in a report to Washington that because requisitions for supplies were based on these faulty numbers, 1.5 million prisoners were getting no food.

Other Losses states that, three years later, in 1948 the ICRC formally requested documents confirming the total number of prisoners in the U.S. Zone and was eventually told that 3.5 million were there, which omitted approximately 1.7 million from the actual number of 5,224,000.

=== Food shortage ===
Other Losses explicates the 1944–1949 German food crisis to support claims for a high mortality rate.

Other Losses concludes that the 1945 food crisis in Europe was contrived by Allied forces by the use of restrictive food import policy, including restrictions on Red Cross food deliveries, and other means. It states that Eisenhower purposefully starved German prisoners given that "[t]here was a lot more wheat available in the combined areas of western Germany, France, Britain, Canada and the USA than there had been in the same year in 1939." Other Losses states that, in May 1945, the ICRC had 100,000 tons of food in storage warehouses in Switzerland. According to the book, when they tried to send trainloads of this food into the U.S. Zone, the U.S. Army sent the trains back, saying their own warehouses were full. Other Losses states that this prompted Max Huber, head of the ICRC, to send a strong letter of protest to the State Department, in which he described the difficulties placed by SHAEF in the way of the ICRC efforts to provide aid. He said, "Our responsibility for the proper use of relief supplies placed in our care is incompatible with a restriction to the fulfilment of orders which render us powerless to furnish relief which we ourselves judge necessary."

U.S. Army warehouses had 13.5 million Red Cross food parcels taken from the ICRC, which were never distributed. The book also states that German civilians were prevented from bringing food to the camps, and that Red Cross food parcels were confiscated by SHAEF, and the War Department banned them from being given to the men in the camps. The book states that Bacque found no evidence of a drastic food shortage in the U.S. Army —

- "We had so much food we didn’t know what to do with it." — Colonel Henry Settle, 106th division.
- "We are not in any desperate need of extra food." — Lt Colonel Bailey, SHAEF.
- "There is in this Theater a substantial excess of subsistence ... over 3,000,000 rations a day less than those requisitioned were issued." — General Robert Littlejohn, Quartermaster of the ETO.

== Reception and criticism ==
=== The New Orleans panel ===
After the publication of Bacque's book, a panel of eight historians gathered for a symposium in the Eisenhower Center for American Studies at the University of New Orleans from December 7–8, 1990 to review Bacque's work. In the introduction to a book later published containing each panellists' papers, Steven E. Ambrose noted that Bacque is a Canadian novelist with no previous historical research or writing experience. His introduction concludes that "Other Losses is seriously—nay, spectacularly—flawed in its most fundamental aspects." The panel comments that, among its many problems, Other Losses:

- misuses documents
- misreads documents
- ignores contrary evidence
- employs a statistical methodology that is hopelessly compromised
- made no attempt to see the evidence he has gathered in relation to the broader situation
- made no attempt to perform any comparative context
- puts words into the mouths of the subjects of his oral history
- ignores a readily available and absolutely critical source that decisively dealt with his central accusation

As a consequence of those and other shortcomings, the book "makes charges that are demonstrably absurd." Panel member Stephen Ambrose later wrote in the New York Times:

Mr Bacque is wrong on every major charge and nearly all his minor ones. Eisenhower was not a Hitler, he did not run death camps, German prisoners did not die by the hundreds of thousands, there was a severe food shortage in 1945, there was nothing sinister or secret about the "disarmed enemy forces" designation or about the column "other losses." Mr Bacque's "missing million" were old men and young boys in the Volkssturm (People's Militia) released without formal discharge and transfers of POWs to other allies control areas. Maj. Ruediger Overmans of the German Office of Military History in Freiburg who wrote the final volume of the official German history of the war estimated that the total death by all causes of German prisoners in American hands could not have been greater than 56,000 approximately 1% of the over 5,000,000 German POWs in Allied hands exclusive of the Soviets. Eisenhower's calculations as to how many people he would be required to feed in occupied Germany in 1945-46 were too low and he had been asking for more food shipments since February 1945. He had badly underestimated the number of German soldiers surrendering to the Western Allies; more than five million, instead of the anticipated three million as German soldiers crossed the Elbe River to escape the Russians. So too with German civilians—about 13 million altogether crossing the Elbe to escape the Russians, and the number of slave laborers and displaced persons liberated was almost 8 million instead of the 5 million expected. In short, Eisenhower faced shortages even before he learned that there were at least 17 million more people to feed in Germany than he had expected not to mention all of the other countries in war-ravaged Europe, the Philippines, Okinawa and Japan. All Europe went on rations for the next three years, including Britain, until the food crisis was over.

Historians Gunter Bischof and Brian Loring Villa stated that a research report from the panel "soundly refuted the charges of Other Losses, especially Bacque's fanciful handling of statistics." The historians further stated:

It is not necessary to review here Bacque's extravagant statistical claims which are the heart of his conspiracy theory. The eight scholars who gathered in New Orleans and contributed to Eisenhower and the German POWs: Facts against Falsehood (1992) refuted Bacque's wily misinterpretations of statistics and oral history evidence in detail. Numerous reviews of the book written by the top talent in the military history profession such as John Keegan and Russel Weigley were persuaded by the findings of the book. These findings have since been further solidified by detailed case studies on individual American POW camps in Germany hastily built at the end of the war, like Christof Strauss's exhaustive Heidelberg dissertation on the POW and internment in the Heilbronn camp. The mountain of evidence has been building that Bacque's charge of the "missing million" supposedly perishing in the American (and French) POW camps in Germany and France is based on completely faulty interpretation of statistical data. There was never any serious disagreement that the German POWs were treated badly by the U.S. Army and suffered egregiously in these camps in the first weeks after the end of the war. That the chaos of the war's end would also produce potentially mismatches and errors in record keeping should surprise no one either. But there was NO AMERICAN POLICY to starve them to death as Bacque asserts and NO COVER UP either after the war. No question about it, there were individual American camp guards who took revenge on German POWs based on their hatred of the Nazis.

The New Orleans panel's book introduction concluded "[t]hat Bacque is wrong on nearly every major and nearly all his minor charges seem to us to be overwhelmingly obvious. To sum up: Eisenhower was not a Hitler, he did not run death camps, German prisoners did not die by the hundreds of thousands, there was indeed a severe world food shortage in 1945, there was nothing sinister or secret about DEF designation or about the Other Losses column. Bacque's "Missing Million" were old and young boys in the militia dismissed early from the American camps; they were escapees from camps and POWs/DEFs transferred from camp to camp in Germany and Europe for various reasons."

Villa states that "James Bacque's Other Losses illustrates what happens when the context surrounding historical persons and important events is lost. The effect to give known facts a twist that seems dramatically new in important ways, but this is means the appearance of originality is a little deceptive. For the most part, Bacque's book is not very original at all. When it seems so, the price is purchased at the price of accuracy." He further stated that "[t]hose parts of Other Losses that might rise above a failing grade in an undergraduate term paper are not new. It has long been known that German prisoners of war suffered terribly at the end of World War II, that they died by the thousands after hostilities ceased in the European theater, and that many were required to work as forced laborers for the victors." The main lines of the story have long been known, written up for example in the extensive German "Maschke Commission" between 1962 and 1975. Villa states that Bacque only adds two "novel" propositions: first, that the number that died was in the hundreds of thousands, and seconds, that these deaths were the result of deliberate extermination on the part of Eisenhower. "The falsity of Bacque's charges can be easily demonstrated once the context, particularly the decision-making environment, is examined."

Bischof concludes that just the application of common sense alone refutes many of the most "fantastical charges" of Bacque, such as asking the question "How could a single man order one million men killed without being caught in the heinous act? How could the bodies disappear without one soldier's coming forward in nearly fifty years to relieve his conscience? How could the Americans (almost one-third of whom are by ethnic background German) conspire for so long to cover up such a vast crime?"

In a 1989 Time Magazine book review, Ambrose did, however, apart from his criticisms of the book, concede that "We as Americans can't duck the fact that terrible things happened. And they happened at the end of a war we fought for decency and freedom, and they are not excusable."

=== Documentary evidence of deaths ===
Other Losses asserts that roughly a million German prisoners—the "Missing Million"—disappeared between two reports issued on June 2, 1945, with one (the last of the daily reports) totaling prisoners in the European Theater of Operations (ETO) in U.S. custody at 2,870,400, while the other (the first of the weekly reports) gives the figure as 1,836,000 prisoners in the Communication Zone (COM Z). As a consequence of this, according to Quartermaster Reports the number of rations issued to the camps was reduced by 900,000. Historian Albert Cowdrey states that the reason for this is simply that COM Z is a subordinate of the ETO, and its figures omit prisoners held by other armies. In fact, Cowdrey states that the two documents further both cite exactly the same number of total prisoners in the ETO: 3,193,747. Cowdrey concludes "[t]o judge by these documents, there was no Missing Million. There was not even a missing one."

The title of "Other Losses" derives from the heading of a column in weekly reports of the U.S. Army's theater provost marshal, which Other Losses states is actually a "body count" of dead prisoners. Cowdrey states that, in many cases, as explained by the footnotes in the very documents themselves, the "other losses" were transfers between zones and camps, which were regularly done for a variety of reasons, none of them sinister and all properly noted in the accompanying documents. Cowdrey further states that, not only are these figures many times mentioned in the footnotes, but they are also reflected in the actual increase and decrease in numbers of each camp in the individual army reports. Cowdrey concludes "it is unclear how Bacque could have failed either to see these documents or, if he saw them, to understand their significance to the book he was writing." In addition, while Other Losses asserts that these prisoners died of diseases or slow starvation, Cowdrey states that even a cursory glance at the figures shows that this would have been impossible, with figures varying between zero and over 189,000 from week to week.

The introduction to the book publishing many of the New Orleans panel papers also noted that Bacque ignored the greatest source for the "other losses" column, an August 1945 Report of the Military Governor that states "An additional group of 664,576 are lists as 'other losses' , consisting largely of members of the Volkssturm [People's Militia] released without a formal charge." It stated that Bacque ignored this document despite its presence in the National Archives, the Eisenhower Library and elsewhere. It further stated the dismissal of the Volkssturm (mostly old men and boys) "accounts for most, quite probably all, of Bacque's 'Missing Million'". Bischof notes that, in his later American edition of Other Losses, Bacque discredits the document as a fake "with a further fantastic twist in his convoluted cycle of conspiracy theories, he claims that Eisenhower and the army 'camouflaged' dead POWs/DEFs by listing them as 'discharged Volkssturm.'" Even though Eisenhower himself did not write the document, Bacque concludes that it must have been "doctored".

Of prisoners in French custody, the historian Rudiger Overmans wrote that, while the total number of prisoners dying in French custody might have exceeded the official statistic of 21,000, no evidence exists that it was hundreds of thousands of deaths higher than that figure, as Bacque claims. Overmans states that, in addition to the various problems with the Bacque's "death rate" calculations regarding the Rheinwiesenlager transit camps, he ignores that these camps were managed almost entirely by Germans and claimed that no record existed of the handover of the camps to the French in June and July 1945, when detailed records of the handover exist. Overmans also said that Bacque incorrectly claimed that the United States did nothing to help with the French Rheinwiesenlager camps, when the United States engaged in a large operation to raise the caloric intake of those prisoners. Bacque's claims that the 167,000 in French camps that were dus pour des raisons divers (other losses) actually died in the winter of 1945–46 not only are not supported by the evidence, but they ignore French documents stating that that figure reflects the release of Volkssturm, women and the sick from those camps.

Overmans states that Bacque's claim that the 800,000 to 1,000,000 missing prisoners were originally German soldiers that fled from the east into western hands contradicts Soviet POW evidence "well established that we can exclude the idea of an extra million hiding somewhere in the figures." Overmans states that Bacque's claim that one million fewer prisoners were taken by the Soviet Union than thought produces absurd results, such as that only 100,000 total prisoners could have died in Soviet hands when it is well documented that this amount was exceeded by the dead prisoners from Stalingrad alone. Bacque claimed that up to 500,000 of the missing prisoners were in Soviet camps. Postwar Soviet POW evidence was discredited when the KGB opened its archives in the 1990s and an additional 356,687 German soldiers and 93,900 civilians, previously recorded as missing, were found to be listed as dying in the Soviet camps. Overmans also states that, did they as Bacque claims, flee to the American Rheinwiesenlager camps, they could have easily had contact with their relatives and that it is "quite inconceivable that these prisoners would not have been reported as missing by their relatives." Overmans states that the vast majority of this extra million would have been recorded in registrations that occurred in 1947–1948 and 1950, "but the registrations showed nothing of the kind." Overmans further states that, as evidence that Germans believed that missing veterans were mostly in the west, Bacque relies on a statement by Konrad Adenauer that turns out in the minutes of the purported meeting to be a "statement related to a TASS report concerning the POWs in the Soviet Union. So much for Bacque's careful use of sources."

=== Plausibility of avoiding repercussion ===
Overmans states that, comporting with the most basic matters of common sense, "if indeed 726,000 soldiers had died in the American camps (Bacque's number excluding those who supposedly died in French custody or after discharge), what became of the bodies?" Given that the Rheinwiesenlager stretched along 200 kilometers of the Rhine river, "Bacque's 726,000 dead would mean roughly 3,600 dead per kilometer or 5,800 per mile – better than one corpse per foot. Yet despite the widespread construction work carried out after the war, not a single one of these legions of dead was found." However, the sites where the camps were located are considered war graves where excavation is officially forbidden making such research problematical.

Villa states that, by Bacque's reasoning, George C. Marshall, who gave SHAEF as much or more attention to detail than did Eisenhower, would be similarly guilty, perhaps more so under his reasoning, though "Bacque" who cares little for exploring the context, does not even raise the question." Villa states that "It is a virtual impossibility that Eisenhower could have executed an extermination policy on his own" and "a near absolute impossibility that Marshall would not have noticed it, let alone that he would ever have tolerated it" and "what about the scores of officers and millions of soldiers who served under Eisenhower?"

Other Losses argues that Eisenhower's staff must have been implicated, charging "[t]he squalor of the camps came from the moral squalor polluting the higher levels of the army." Villa states that "[p]erhaps realizing that he already has a thesis involving a massive American conspiracy, Bacque is careful to exclude British officers from any participation or even knowledge of the crime. Although in his vast indictment, Bacque has included virtually Eisenhower's entire staff, all the doctors and personnel running the camps, the press who failed to uncover the monstrous crime and a whole generation of knowing but silent Germans, he has included not a single Briton." Villa notes that Bacque ignores that SHAEF was a fully integrated Anglo-American command, and many of Eisenhower's top officers were Britons who would have also had to cover up the conspiracy. Villa states that Bacque did not even need to read books to realize this, "all he had to do was to look at the pictures: in slightly more than half the portraits contained therein, the staff officers wear British uniforms. Bacque, one understands, wants a villain in the piece. A complicated modern military bureaucracy such as SHAEF, is a tedious subject to study, unlikely to yield the insidious conspiracy apparently sought by this ex-publisher." Villa stated regarding the plausibility of the claims in Other Losses that "The impossibility of Bacque's selective crime thesis—[that the poor treatment was solely carried out by Americans]—becomes all the more evident when one examines the basic decisions affecting occupation policy."

Regarding the impossibility of a conspiracy on the scale purported by Bacque, Villa states that "[i]n truth, had Eisenhower committed the crimes Bacque alleges, someone surely would have gossiped, ratted, leaked, or even just hinted. None did. Not even Field Marshal Montgomery. Certainly, if there had been a holocaust, it could never have been covered up." Regarding the overall bureaucracy within which Eisenhower had to operate, Villa stated that "Although the average reader of Other Losses would never know it, there was a constellation of authorities to whom Eisenhower had to report his actions. Examining the situation as of May 8, 1945, when his murderous policy is said to have gone into full gear, no responsible historian could ignore the many limitations on Eisenhower's authority that made it impossible for him to carry out an independent policy in Germany."

=== Methodology ===
Cowdrey stated that Bacque's methodology for determining just the "Other Losses" figures was also "slipshod", with Bacque filling gaps in the records where no "other losses" were recorded by "comput[ing] the number of deaths by applying the death rate given in Army statistics for another period to the known number of prisoners at hand." Cowdrey states that the "rate given in Army statistics" turned out to be a "rate invented by Bacque himself." Cowdrey states that, with regard to Bacque's attempt to analyze a U.S. Army hospital record document, Bacque not only missed an obvious typo throwing his calculations off by 10, but he also badly erred in the math used to tabulate purported death rates of 30%, which he attempts to use to support his claim that the "other losses" column in the weekly army reports reflects a body count. Cowdrey concludes that "the mathematical blunders of Other Losses are elementary. One turns from them feeling only embarrassment for the author who naively grounds his thesis upon them."

Historian Rolf Steininger stated that Bacque's claim that the failure to publish the 1960s and 1970s German Maschke Commission finding death figures to be a "cover up" contradicts that the entire 22 volume series was actually published in 1972 without any restrictions, to which only an oblique reference is made in an Other Losses endnote. Steininger says that "Bacque himself is one of the mythmakers" and that, when Bacque attacks the Maschke Commission scholars as "client-academics", "he oversteps the bounds of mythmaking and enters the territory of libel." Historian Gunter Bischof states that it is simply "outrageous to dismiss this vast and impressive body of scholarship as being designed to produce 'soothing conclusions' for the German public, as Bacque puts it."

Bischof said that while "most scholarly reviewers of Bacque's book have pointed out that Bacque fails to establish the proper historical context", "worse, the historical records that Bacque did use are amateurishly misrepresented and often misleading or wrong. Once Bacque's endnotes are checked, frequent misreadings of documents are easily discernible." As an example, Bischof states that Bacque charged that General Mark Clark's raising of caloric intake in the Ebensee camp was "trying to exculpate himself before history" of Eisenhower's scheme to exterminate Germans. Bischof states that Bacque fails to tell his readers, first, that Ebensee was not even an Allied prisoner of war camp, but a camp for displaced persons that was actually housing Polish Jews liberated from a nearby concentration camp, second, that Clark raised the caloric intake levels in response to a report critical of the treatment of liberated Jews that had just been released and, third, that Eisenhower soon thereafter also raised the levels for his Jewish displaced persons in camps run by Eisenhower.

=== Oral sources ===
Regarding oral histories, Bischof concludes that "Bacque abuses the process through his highly selective presentation of oral histories and memoir literature." Other Losses cited Colonel Phillip S. Lauben as the source for the claim that the "other losses" weekly report column covered up deaths. The New Orleans panel noted that Lauben himself twice has since repudiated this. When describing his interview with Bacque, Lauben stated "I am 91 years old, legally blind, and my memory has lapsed to a point where it is quite unreliable ... Often during my talk with Mr Bacque I reminded him that my memory has deteriorated badly during the 40 odd years since 1945. Mr Bacque read to me the USFET POW figures for discharge and transfers to other national zones. It seemed to me that, after accounting for transfers and discharges, there was nothing left to make up the grand total except deaths and escapes. I.e.: the term OTHER LOSSES. I was mistaken ... many POWs were transferred from one U.S. Command to another U.S. Command. This left one with a loss and the other with a gain."

Bacque described his other witness, John Foster, as a camp guard "in charge of the work detail of fifty men, Germans and Americans, who did nothing all day but drag bodies out of the camp." Bischof cites a researcher for the Canadian Broadcasting Corporation (CBC) who tracked down Foster who told the researcher that "he never was a member of a burial detail, he never buried a body in his life. And he's unaware of any such activity in any camps." When the CBC interviewer confronted Bacque with Foster's denial, Bacque responded "well, he's wrong. He's just wrong."

Bacque also interviewed Martin Brech, a U.S. soldier who was a guard at the Andernach camp. Brech discussed his experiences in detail, in which he witnessed the poor conditions in the camp, a large number of deaths, and the systematic starving of the prisoners. He said, "The silence about this atrocity has pained me for forty-five years and I'm deeply grateful that James Bacque's 'Other Losses' has, at last, brought the truth to light."

Bacque states that he has received letters and phone calls from about 2,000 Germans who survived the camps, expressing gratitude that the truth about their experience has finally been published.

=== Context of food shortage ===
Historian James Tent concludes that "James Bacque might be willing to relegate the world food shortage to the category of myth. Few others will do so. Perhaps he can try the interviewing techniques that he employed in Other Losses—namely putting words in the mouths of selective eyewitnesses." The introduction to the New Orleans panel's book states that Bacque's insistence not only defies common sense, but it would have shocked anyone in Europe in 1945. Other Losses states "There was a lot more wheat available in the combined areas of western Germany, France, Britain, Canada and the USA than there had been in the same year in 1939." Tent states that Bacque selectively cited diary entries and other sources to come to the conclusion of a food abundance and the lack of transportation problems. Tent further stated that Bacque's statements that the German population was 4% smaller in 1945 than in 1939 while mentioning only an "influx of refugees from the East", completely ignored that that "influx" consisted of a staggering 10 to 13 million Germans displaced from the east and south into Germany that had to be fed and housed. The panel introduction also stated that Bacque ignored the overriding reality that German agriculture had suffered extreme productivity decreases in 1944 and 1945, a shortage of synthetic fertilizers had developed after nitrogen and phosphate stocks were channeled into ammunition production, Tent stated that Bacque completely ignored that, because coal reserves had disappeared from the industrial pipeline, fertilizer plants and other food production facilities were inoperable, meaning that German farmers could expect little if any fertilizer over the next one to two years and that fuel was next to non-existent to power run-down farm equipment. In addition, the panel introduction said that Bacque ignored that the destroyed German transportation infrastructure created additional logistical nightmares, with railroad lines, bridges and terminals left in ruins, the turnaround time for railroad wagons was five times higher than the prewar average, and, of the 15,600 German locomotives, 38.6% were no longer operating and 31% were damaged.

The introduction to the panel's book also states that Bacque ignored that Eisenhower himself was the one warning his superiors about food shortages as early as February 1945—months before the war had even ended—then again in May when Eisenhower requested food imports from the United States. Tent stated that Bacque also misleadingly cited only part of a June 1945 war report that 630,000 tons of imported wheat would meet the minimum German civilians minimum food requirements, leaving the reader thinking that the food shortage could easily be solved by United States shipments, without informing the reader of an accompanying report that the Allies brought in 600,000 tons of grain, and that it was quickly used up.

While Other Losses claims that the United States dismissed the Swiss Government from its role as a protecting power, Villa states that Bacque ignores that it was the Soviets that had vetoed permitting the continued existence of the German government in May 1945, leaving the Swiss no longer wanting to remain the protecting power because they no longer had a German government to which to report, and that the United Nations—including Canada—had concluded the same. Villa adds that, contrary to Bacque's implications, there is no evidence that Eisenhower would not have wanted the German government to continue operating under Doenitz' leadership in Flensburg. Even with regard to the supposed Canadian protest, Villa states "this is another case of Bacque's outrageous editing of a document" with Bacque using ellipses to edit out of his quote of the document the key text stating "in the present unique situation there can be no protecting power for a Government which cannot exist."

Bischof stated that, even in Bacque's later released American edition, "Bacque refuses to address the overwhelming evidence that there had been a great shortage of food in central Europe, beyond admitting that there was a food crisis in Germany in 1946" and "but again he turns the evidence on its head when he charges that 'Allied food policy [no longer does he heap the blame on the Americas alone, as in his Canadian edition] deliberately hampered the Germans in attempting to feed themselves.'" Bischof states "the opposite is true", citing the large amounts of U.S. Army GARDA Aid, without which "German and Austrian civilians would have had a much tougher time surviving the hunger months of 1945 and 1946."

=== Context of Eisenhower quotations ===
Bischof and Ambrose stated that Other Losses claims of Eisenhower that "he felt ashamed that he bore a German name", citing Stephen Ambrose and Colonel Ernest Fisher, when what Ambrose actually said to Fischer was "It is rumored that Ike once said, 'I'm ashamed my name is Eisenhower,' but I've never seen it, never used it, and don't believe it." They concluded that "[s]uch twisting of historical evidence—both primary and secondary—is not unusual in Other Losses. In the end, Bacque usually resorts to conspiracy theories to salvage his outrageous charges." Regarding another example, Bischof and Ambrose stated that "[o]ne of Bacque's strongest quotations is a line from one of Eisenhower's letters to his wife, Mamie: 'God I hate the Germans.' Bacque seems not to understand that the words were appropriate to the subject, that Ike was by no means unique, and that John Eisenhower printed the letter in his book Letters to Mamie, where Bacque found it, without embarrassment." They also stated that, when in 1943, when discussing that he had never been trained for such logistics when he faced a similar problem in Tunisia, Eisenhower stated "we should have killed more of them", which Bacque took seriously in "Other Losses" (it was also removed in 1969 from a report lest it offend Allies). POWs from Tunisia fared well after being shipped to the United States, where they were well fed in U.S. POW camps.

=== Context of Disarmed Enemy Forces designations ===
With regard to DEF designations, Historian Brian Loring Villa stated that Bacque ignores the 1943 debates of the European Advisory Commission (EAC) and the 1944 EAC's instruments of surrender, not picking up until the March 1945. Other Losses states that "in March, as Germany was being cracked ... a message was being signed and initialed by Eisenhower proposed a startling departure from the Geneva Convention (GC)—the creation of a new class of prisoners who would not be fed by the Army after the surrender of Germany. The message, dated March 10, reads: ... " Other Losses then quotes the cable from the third paragraph, which, Villa states, permits the casual reader to believe that Eisenhower invented the term "disarmed enemy forces", specifically omitting the other parts of the document referencing the EAC's draft surrender terms suggesting a designation to avoid the Geneva Convention categories, or the later use of the term "disarmed enemy forces." Villa states that, when the actual full correspondence is read, Eisenhower was merely proposing, in March 1945 with thousands of prisoners surrendering, to act on the surrender condition drafts worked out months earlier. Villa concludes that "[a]ll Bacque had to do was look for the EAC draft surrender terms mentioned in the cable—these can readily be found in the standard collection of printed United States Diplomatic documents."

Villa further states that Other Losses wrongly cites a March CCS directive to Eisenhower, claiming that it directs Eisenhower to not take any prisoners after Victory in Europe (V-E) Day, when in fact, the directive states that those taken after V-E day should not be designated as "Prisoners of War" under the Geneva Convention. In fact, JCS 1067 required Eisenhower to continue to take prisoners after V-E Day. Moreover, if Bacque truly believes that Eisenhower was supposed to stop taking prisoners, Villa states that Bacque does not explain how Eisenhower could have gotten away with taking 2 million prisoners after this date without CCS action.

Villa also states that Bacque's assertion that the British rejected designations to not comply with the GC requirements are entirely unfounded and ignore that the British themselves requested that they be permitted to use such designations, with that request being granted by the CCS, with German prisoners of war who surrendered to the British being referred to as "Surrendered Enemy Personnel". Villa states that Bacque also entirely ignores that it was the Soviets that had first raised issues about GC requirements in wartime conferences because they were not GC signatories, and as such, did not want condition surrender terms reflecting GC requirements. Villa stated that Bacque goes further regarding the Soviets, implying that the scale of Soviet gulags were a myth invented to cover up the American crime he asserts. Villa also stated that Bacque claims that Eisenhower initially underestimated the expected POW figures as part of his attempt to starve them, while in actuality, Eisenhower was desperately requesting to have food imports approved. Other Losses fails to cite JCS 1067, the primary restriction on food importation, even once in its notes. Villa also states that Bacque misrepresented a June 5, 1945 memorandum in a way that makes the reader believe that Eisenhower could have requisitioned additional food if he had wanted to, while the memorandum itself makes clear that Eisenhower had requested and was denied additional imports. Villa concludes: "Need it be added that anyone going back to the documents to find purported confessions of an extermination policy by one of Eisenhower's principal staff officers will find nothing even suggestive of it? Bacque has simply distorted the context beyond all recognition."

== Historical evidence ==
Several historians rebutting Bacque have argued that the missing POWs simply went home, that Red Cross food aid was sent to displaced civilians and that German POWs were fed the same rations that the U.S. Army was providing to the civilian population. U.S. and German sources estimate the number of German POWs who died in captivity at between 56,000 and 78,000, or about one per cent of all German prisoners, which is roughly the same as the percentage of American POWs who died in German captivity.

The book Other Losses alleged 1.5 million prisoners were missing and estimated that up to 500,000 of these were in Soviet camps. When the KGB opened its archives in the 1990s, 356,687 German soldiers and 93,900 civilians previously recorded as missing were found to be listed in the Bulanov report as dying in the Soviet camps.

German POW expert Kurt W. Bohme noted that, of the 5 million prisoners in American hands, the European Theater of Operations provost marshal recorded a total of 15,285 prisoner deaths. In 1974, the German Red Cross reported that about 41,000 German MIAs were last reported in western Germany, which is also the location of the prisoner camps. It is reasonable to assume that some deaths in transit camps just before the end of the war went unreported in the chaos at the time. Historian Albert Cowdrey estimates that the total figure is unlikely to be above the aggregate of the recorded deaths and the MIAs, which together total 56,285. That maximum number would constitute approximately 1.1% of the 5 million total prisoners held by U.S. forces. That figure also is close to Bohme's estimate of 1% for deaths of prisoners held by the Western powers.

Many of these occurred in the initial Rheinwiesenlager transit camps. The German Maschke Commission which studied prisoner deaths in the 1960s and 1970s concluded that 557,000 prisoners lived in the Rheinwiesenlager camps. The official death toll for those camps was 3,053. The number registered by local Parish authorities was 5,311. The Maschke Commission noted that the largest claim was that "32,000 fatalities had been heard of", but the Maschke Commission considered this account to be impossible, as was anything in excess of double the parish authorities' figure.

While harsh treatment of prisoners occurred, no evidence exists that it was part of an organized systematic effort. Bohme concluded that Eisenhower and the U.S. Army had to improvise for months in taking care of the masses of prisoners to prevent a catastrophe: "In spite of all the misery that occurred behind the barbed wire, the catastrophe was prevented; the anticipated mass deaths did not happen."

The total death rates for United States-held prisoners is also far lower than those held by most countries throughout the war. In 1941 alone, two million of the 3.3 million German-held Soviet POWs—about 60%—died or were executed by the special SS "Action Groups" (Einsatzgruppen). By 1944, only 1.05 million of 5 million Soviet prisoners in German hands had survived. Of some 2–3 million German POWs in Russian hands, more than 1 million died. Of the 132,000 British and American POWs taken by the Japanese army, 27.6% died in captivity—the Bataan death march being the most notorious incident, producing a POW death rate of between 40 and 60%.

The historian Niall Ferguson claims a significantly lower death rate of 0.15% for German POWs held by Americans, less than every other country except for fellow allied power Britain. Ferguson further claims that another advantage to surrendering to the British rather than the Americans was that the British were also less likely to hand German prisoners over to the Soviet Union. Large numbers of German prisoners were transferred between the Allies. The U.S. gave 765,000 to France, 76,000 to Benelux countries, and 200,000 to the Soviet Union. The U.S. also chose to refuse to accept the surrender of German troops attempting to surrender in Saxony and Bohemia. These soldiers were instead handed over to the Soviet Union. The Soviet Union, in turn, handed German prisoners over to other Eastern European nations, for example, 70,000 to Poland. According to Ferguson, the death rate of German soldiers held prisoner in the Soviet Union was 35.8%.

Ferguson tabulated the total death rate for POWs in World War II as follows:

	Percentage of POWs who died
Russian POWs held by Germans	57.5%
German POWs held by Russians	35.8%
American POWs held by Japanese	33.0%
German POWs held by Eastern Europeans	32.9%
British POWs held by Japanese	24.8%
British POWs held by Germans	3.5%
German POWs held by French	2.58%
German POWs held by Americans	0.15%
German POWs held by British	0.03%

=== Lack of records ===
There are no longer any surviving records showing which German POWs and Disarmed Enemy Forces were in U.S. custody prior to roughly September 1945. The early standard operating procedure for handling POWs and Disarmed Enemy Forces was to send a copy of the POW form to the Central Registry of War Criminals and Security Suspects (CROWCASS).

However, this practice was apparently stopped as impractical, and all copies of the POW forms, roughly eight million, were destroyed. By way of contrast, the Soviet archives contain dossiers for every German POW they held, averaging around 15 pages for each.

== See also ==
- Debellatio
- Disarmed Enemy Forces - Redesignation of POW's in order to negate the Geneva Convention
- Rheinwiesenlager
- German POWs in Norway
