= Lists of World War II prisoner-of-war camps =

The following list includes prisoner-of-war camps during World War II, both allied and axis:

== Allied prisoner-of-war camps during World War II ==
- List of World War II prisoner-of-war camps in Australia
- List of World War II prisoner-of-war camps in Canada
- List of World War II prisoner-of-war camps administered by France
- List of prisoner-of-war camps in Allied-occupied Germany
- List of World War II prisoner-of-war camps in Kenya
- List of World War II prisoner-of-war camps in the Soviet Union
- List of World War II prisoner-of-war camps in the United Kingdom
- List of World War II prisoner-of-war camps in the United States

== Axis prisoner-of-war camps during World War II ==
- List of prisoner-of-war camps in Germany
- List of Japanese-run internment camps during World War II
- List of Japanese hell ships
- List of World War II prisoner-of-war camps in Italy
