= German prisoners of war in northwest Europe =

Gernan surrenders on the Western Front of World War II

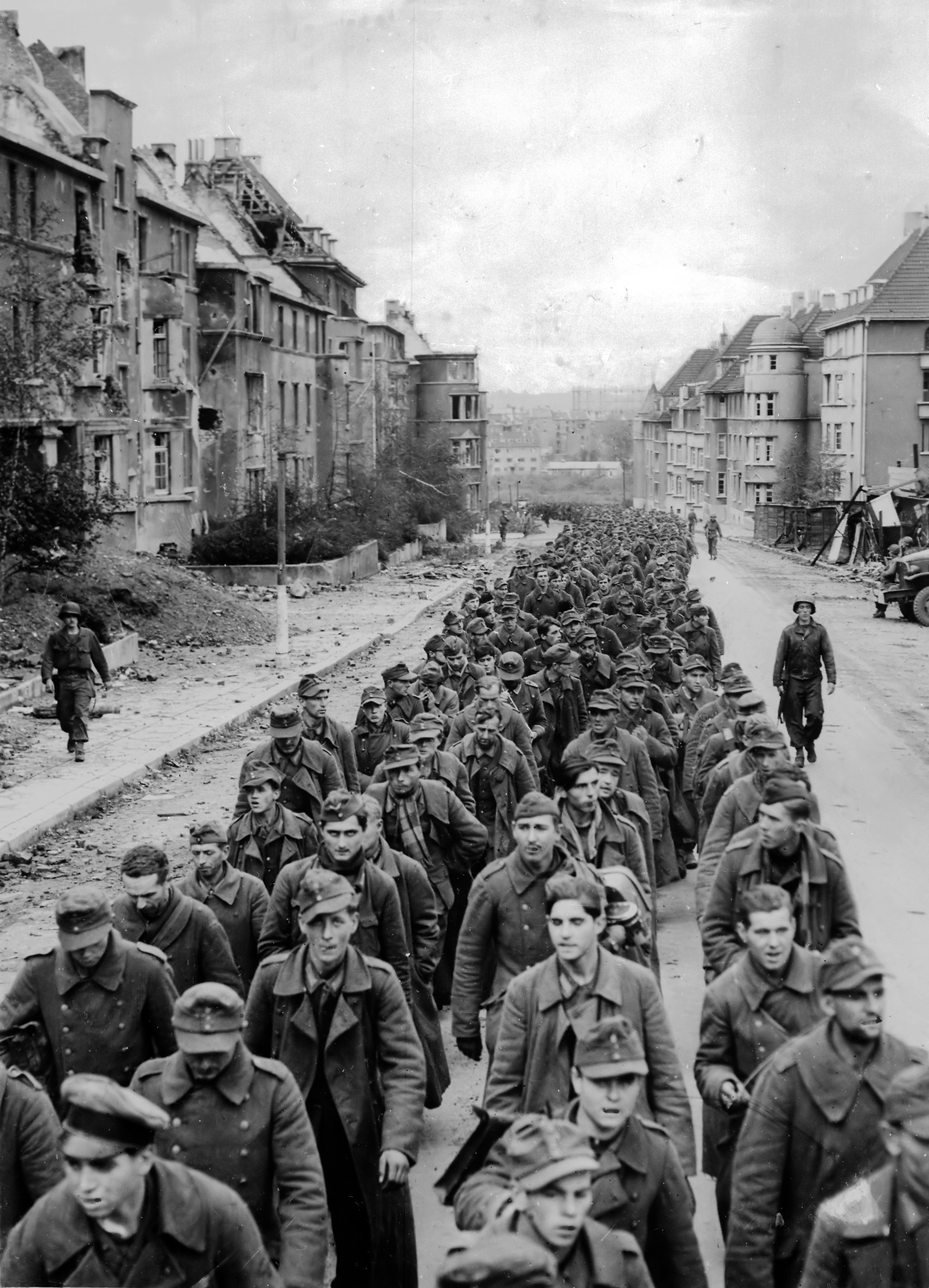
Some of the German soldiers who were captured during the Battle of Aachen in October 1944

More than 2.8 million German soldiers surrendered on the Western Front between D-Day (June 6, 1944) and the end of April 1945; 1.3 million between D-Day and March 31, 1945; and 1.5 million of them in the month of April. From early March, these surrenders seriously weakened the Wehrmacht in the West, and made further surrenders more likely, thus having a snowballing effect. On March 27, Dwight D. Eisenhower declared at a press conference that the enemy were a whipped army. In March, the daily rate of POWs taken on the Western Front was 10,000; in the first 14 days of April it rose to 39,000, and in the last 16 days the average peaked at 59,000 soldiers captured each day. (Note: In the last sixteen days of April, (over) 951,827 Germans were captured to make a total of (over) 1,500,000 for the whole of April.) The number of prisoners taken in the West in March and April was over 1,800,000, more than double the 800,000 German soldiers who surrendered to the Russians in the last three or four months of the war. One reason for this huge difference, possibly the most important, was that German forces facing the Red Army tended to fight to the end for fear of Soviet captivity whereas German forces facing the Western Allies tended to surrender without putting up much if any resistance. Accordingly, the number of Germans killed and wounded was much higher in the East than in the West. (Note: Indicative of the huge discrepancy are the Heeresarzt 10-Day Casualty Reports per Theater of War, 1945 [BA/MA RH 2/1355, 2/2623, RW 6/557, 6/559]. While certainly incomplete (especially for the period 11–20 April 1945), they reflect the ratio between casualties in both theaters in the final months of the war. For the period 1 March 1945-20 April 1945 they recorded 343,321 killed and wounded in the East (62,861 killed, 280,460 wounded) versus 22,598 killed and wounded in the West (5,778 killed, 16,820 wounded), an East vs. West ratio of about 15:1 in killed and wounded. The largest difference was in the period from 1-10.4.1945, for which the Heeresarzt recorded 63,386 killed and wounded in the East (12,510 killed, 50,876 wounded) vs. only 431 in the West (100 killed, 331 wounded), an East vs. West ratio of about 147:1 in killed and wounded.)

The Western Allies also took 134,000 German soldiers prisoner in North Africa, and at least 220,000 by the start of 1945 in the Italian campaign. The total haul of German POWs held by the Western Allies by April 30, 1945, in all theatres of war was over 3,150,000, rising in northwest Europe to 7,614,790 after the end of the war.

The Allied armies that captured the 2.8 million German soldiers up to April 30, 1945, while Adolf Hitler was still alive and resisting as hard as he could, comprised at their peak 88 divisions, with a peak strength in May 1945 of 2,639,377 in the US and 1,095,744 in the British and Canadian forces. The casualties suffered by the Western Allies in making this contribution to the defeat of the Wehrmacht were relatively light, 164,590–195,576 killed/missing, 537,590 wounded, and 78,680 taken prisoner, a total loss of 780,860 to 811,846 to inflict a loss of 2.8 million prisoners on the German army. The number of dead and wounded on both sides was about equal. (Note: 263,000 Germans killed according to George C Marshall, Biennial reports of the Chief of Staff of the United States Army to the Secretary of War: 1 July 1939–30 June 1945. Washington, DC: Center of Military History, 1996. Page 202. According to MacDonald "exclusive of prisoners of war, all German casualties in the west from D-day to V–E Day probably equaled or slightly exceeded Allied losses". In the related footnote on the same page MacDonald writes the following: "The only specific figures available are from OB WEST for the period 2 June 1941 – 10 April 1945 as follows: Dead, 80,819; wounded, 265,526; missing, 490,624; total, 836,969. (Of the total, 4,548 casualties were incurred prior to D-day.) See Rpts, Der Heeresarzt im Oberkommando des Heeres Gen St d H/Gen Qu, Az.: 1335 c/d (IIb) Nr.: H.A./263/45 g. Kdos. of 14 Apr 45 and 1335 c/d (Ilb) (no date, but before 1945). The former is in OCMH X 313, a photostat of a document contained in German armament folder H 17/207; the latter in folder 0KW/1561 (OKW Wehrmacht Verluste). These figures are for the field army only, and do not include the Luftwaffe and Waffen-SS. Since the Germans seldom remained in control of the battlefield in a position to verify the status of those missing, a considerable percentage of the missing probably were killed. Time lag in reporting probably precludes these figures' reflecting the heavy losses during the Allied drive to the Rhine in March, and the cut-off date precludes inclusion of the losses in the Ruhr Pocket and in other stages of the fight in central Germany.") This, plus the fact that most surrenders occurred in April 1945, suggests that (unlike on the Eastern Front, where the number of German killed and wounded far exceeded the number of prisoners taken by the Soviets), most German soldiers who surrendered to the Western Allies did so without a fight. For instance, in the battle of the Ruhr Pocket, there were about 10,000 fatalities on the German side (including prisoners of war in German captivity, foreign forced laborers, Volkssturm militia and unarmed civilians), whereas about 317,000 Germans surrendered. "Many a German walked mile after mile before finding an American not too occupied with other duties to bother to accept his surrender." For comparison, in the Battle of Halbe on the Eastern Front from 24 April to 1 May 1945, over 30,000 German soldiers, out of a much smaller number encircled, were killed fighting the Red Army.

== Timeline of German surrenders in the West ==
After the D-Day landings German surrenders initially came quite slowly. By June 9 only 4,000 prisoners had been taken, increasing to 15,000 by June 18. The total for June was 47,000, dropping to 36,000 in July; 135,000 were taken in the month subsequent to July 25. August's total was 150,000. The total number of prisoners attributed to the Normandy campaign was 200,000.

With the successful invasion of the south of France on August 15 and the link-up of the US 7th Army from the south and the US 3rd Army from the north on September 11, all the German troops remaining in central and west France were cut off. As a result, and also including the German troops who surrendered in the hot pursuit to the northern border from Normandy, 344,000 German soldiers reportedly surrendered to the Western Allies in September. If this figure is accurate, (Note: OB WEST reported the following figures for the period 2 June 1941 – 10 April 1945: Dead, 80,819; wounded, 265,526; missing, 490,624; total, 836,969. The missing probably include a significant percentage who were killed. These figures are only for the field army and due to time lag probably do not include losses during the Allied drive to the Rhine in March 1945. However, the figures would include all casualties, including prisoners of war reported as missing, that the field army incurred in 1944. Moreover there were no Allied operations in September 1944 that could have yielded such large number of prisoners) it would be one of the largest German losses in a single month of the war so far. To put it in perspective, 41,000 British troops surrendered after Dunkirk, 138,000 British and Indian soldiers surrendered at Singapore, 173,000 UK military became POWs in the entire course of the war, in Europe and the Far East, while the corresponding figure for the US was 130,000 POWs.

Up to October 17, 1944, 610,541 German soldiers surrendered on the Western front. Between October 17 and February 5, 1945, this total of German POWs taken in north-west Europe increased to 860,000. 250,000 POWs were captured between October 17 and February 5 at a rate of 65,000 a month. By February 22, a further 40,000 German soldiers had surrendered and the total number from D-Day until the end of February was over 940,000.

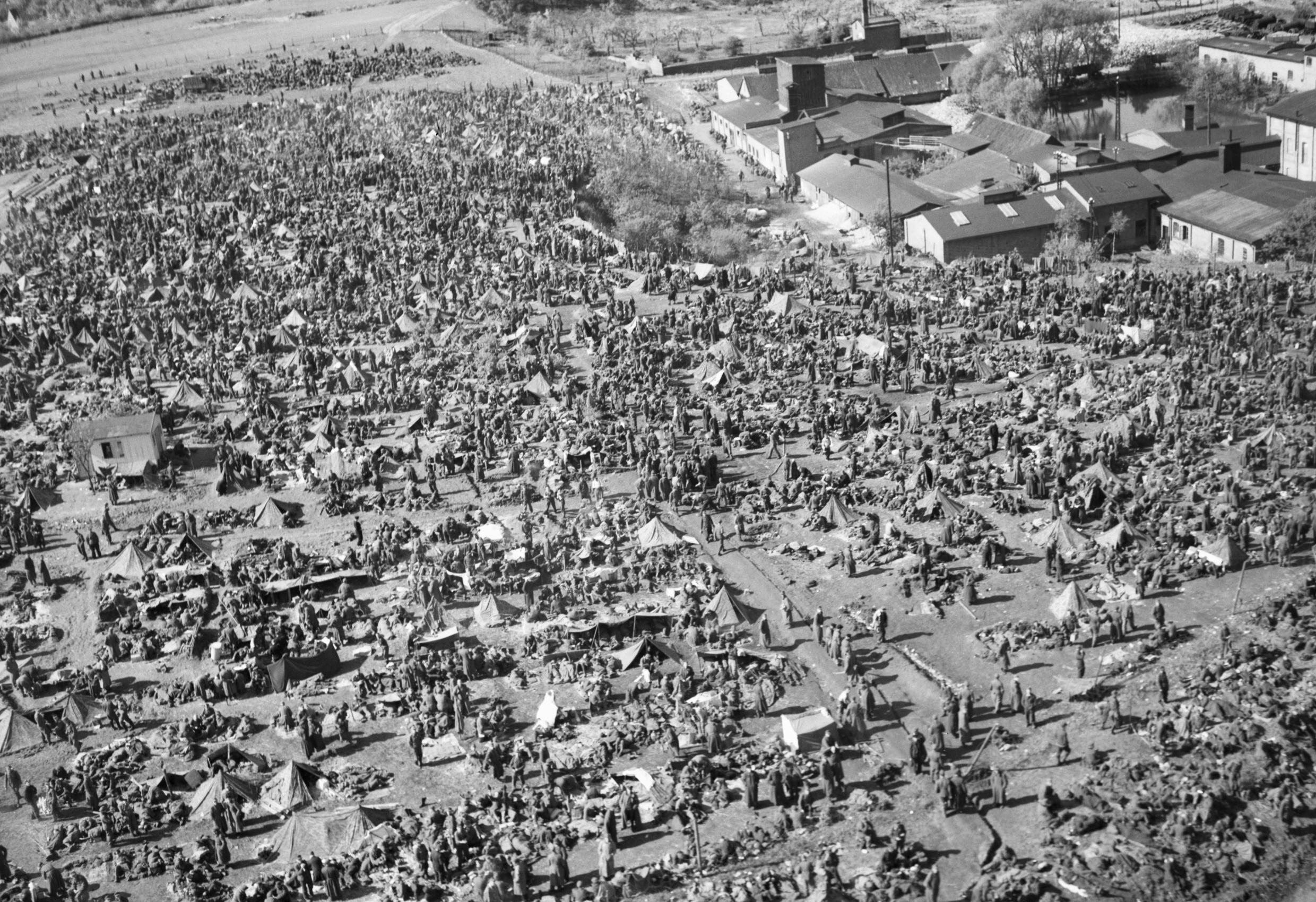
Prisoner of war compound at Hamburg in May 1945 packed with surrendered German troops.

In March 1945, the numbers of German soldiers surrendering accelerated. Eisenhower said they were surrendering at a rate of ten thousand a day but actually approaching 350,000 surrendered in the whole month, bringing the total between D-Day and the end of March 1945 up to 1,300,000. The reason why so many surrendered in March was because Hitler did not allow a fluid response and orderly retreat before the Western Allies' advance towards the Rhine, so that many German soldiers were trapped in indefensible positions to the west of the Rhine, where they were forced to surrender. Eisenhower referred to the Wehrmacht as a 'whipped army' on March 27. In his book Crusade in Europe, Eisenhower wrote 'We owed much to Hitler', because he prevented his generals from pulling back the defending forces to the east of the Rhine, probably no later than early January, thus handing the Western Allies 300,000 prisoners on a plate.

The loss of these battle-hardened soldiers irretrievably weakened the German armies left to defend the great natural barrier of the Rhine, and the disintegration of the German armies in the West is shown in their more and more rapid rate of surrender as April progressed.

In the first five days of April, 146,000 German soldiers were taken prisoner (at a rate of 29,000 a day). In the next nine days, 402,000 (Note: "In the first fourteen days of April 548,173 German prisoners were taken." This means that between April 6 and 14 402,173 prisoners were taken.) prisoners were taken (44,000 a day). Between April 15 and 21, over 450,000 Germans surrendered (Note: Between 1st and 21st April 1945 over 1,000,000 German soldiers surrendered in the West, which means that more than 450,000 surrendered between 15th and 21st April.) (over 60,000 a day); in the last ten days of the month over 500,000 (Note: Between 1st and 20th April less than 1,000,000 German soldiers surrendered, w.e. April 22nd, which means between 21st and 30th April over 500,000 surrendered at a rate of over 50,000 a day.) waved the white flag (over 50,000 a day). For the month as a whole the average rate of Germans surrendering was 50,000 a day.

From D-Day onwards the numbers of German soldiers who surrendered in north-west Europe were as follows: 200,000 in Normandy; 610,000 up to October 17, 1944; 1.3 million up to the end of March 1945 and 2.8 million up to the end of April 1945, when Hitler died.

== German estimates ==
German POWs Held in Captivity

Average during Quarter	Held by Western Allies
4th Quarter 1941	6,600
4th Quarter 1942	22,300
4th Quarter 1943	200,000
4th Quarter 1944	730,000
1st Quarter 1945	920,000
2nd Quarter 1945	5,440,000
3rd Quarter 1945	6,672,000

According to Rüdiger Overmans German losses in the Western theater during the war, dead and missing, not including prisoners taken were fewer than 1,000,000 men, c.20% of total losses of 5.3 million. Overmans put the losses in the West from 1939 to 1943 at 95,066 and 244,891 in 1944 However the American military estimated German casualties in the west from D-day to V–E Day probably equaled or slightly exceeded Allied dead and missing, which were 195,000 The Canadian author James Bacque claims in Other Losses that the United States was responsible for the deaths of 800,000 to 1,000,000 German POW. Rüdiger Overmans believes that "on the basis of factual individual data, shown before, the thesis of the Canadian James Bacque cannot be supported." Overmans maintains that POW deaths in the hands of the Western allies were 76,000.

== Western Allies' figures ==
Date	German POWs taken in northwest Europe by month	Date	German POWs in northwest Europe (total)
June 1944	47,000	Normandy campaign	200,000
July	36,000	D-Day to October 17	610,541
August	150,000	D-Day to February 9, 1945	over 900,000
September	344,000	D-Day to March 9	1,007,000
October	66,000	D-Day to March 31	1,300,000
November	109,000	April 1–14	547,173
December	60,000	April 16	97,118
January 1945	50,000	April 1–16	775,573
February	81,000	the Ruhr pocket	316,930
March	340,000	April 1–21	more than 1,000,000
April	Over 1,500,000	D-Day to April 16	2,055,575

In total, the number of German soldiers who surrendered to the Western Allies in northwest Europe between D-Day and April 30, 1945, was over 2,800,000 (1,300,000 surrendered up to March 31, 1945, and over 1,500,000 surrendered in the month of April).

== Stalin and the German surrenders in the West ==
On March 29, 1945, Joseph Stalin said to Marshal Georgy Zhukov with alarm, "The German front on the West has entirely collapsed." While Stalin did not want the Western Allies to fail, he did not want them to succeed in defeating the German armies facing them before he had defeated the German armies in the East. On March 27 the Reuters correspondent wrote that the British and American armies heading for the heart of Germany were encountering no resistance. On the same day Eisenhower referred to the Wehrmacht in the West as a "whipped army".The Times, March 27, reported that 31,000 Germans surrendered on March 24 and 40,000 on March 25. The Daily Telegraph wrote on March 22 that 100,000 German prisoners had been taken since the Moselle was crossed the day before, and on March 30 that 60,000 POWs had been taken in the last two days. Thus between March 21 and 30, 231,000 German soldiers surrendered to the Western armies. On March 31, at a meeting with the American ambassador W. Averell Harriman, Stalin appeared much impressed by the vast number of prisoners the Allies were rounding up in the West, and said, "Certainly this will help finish the war very soon."

Stalin's concern over the apparent ease with which the Western Allies were capturing so many German soldiers persuaded him, towards the end of March, to start making his plans for the attack on Berlin on April 16, which led to Hitler's suicide on April 30 and the end of the war in Europe. German casualties in the Battle of Berlin (16 April - 2 May 1945) were about 92,000–100,000 killed, 220,000 wounded and 480,000 captured. For comparison, the available German records mention only 2,959 killed and wounded in the West (677 killed, 2,282 wounded) for the period 1-20.4.1945. While these records are incomplete, they show that the fight in the East was by far much bloodier than the fight in the West towards the end of the war.

== See also ==
- German prisoners of war in Azerbaijan
- German prisoners of war in the Soviet Union
- German casualties in World War II
- End of World War II in Europe
- German prisoners of war in the United States
- German prisoners of war in the United Kingdom
- Rheinwiesenlager
- Prisoners of war in World War II
