= German genocide =

German genocide may refer to several different events:

- Herero and Nama genocide, in German West Africa, 1904–1908
- Any of the many campaigns of attempted extermination conducted by Nazi Germany:
  - The Holocaust, here referring exclusively to the attempted extermination of European Jews and not any of the other targets of Nazi Germany
  - Romani Holocaust
  - Nazi crimes against the Polish nation
- Flight and expulsion of Germans during and after World War II
- Other Losses, a 1989 book by James Bacque claiming deliberate starvation of German prisoners of war held in Western internment camps.

== See also ==
- Mass killings by Nazi Germany (disambiguation)
- Generalplan Ost, Nazi Germany's blueprint for genocide, extermination and large-scale ethnic cleansing
