= Rheinwiesenlager =

Prisoner of war camps used by Allied forces late in WWII

- Rhine meadow camps
- Part of Prisoner of War Temporary Enclosures (PWTE)
- West Germany
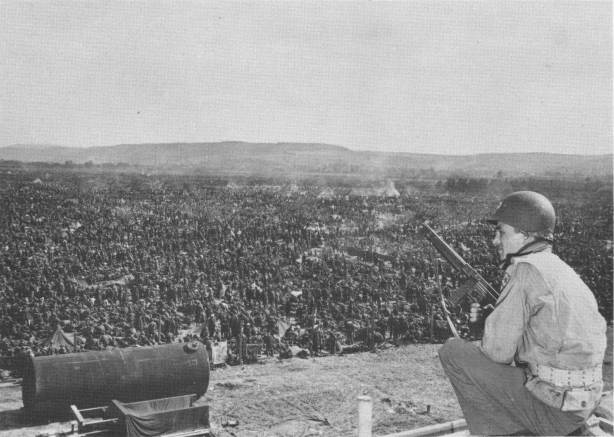
- A U.S. soldier at Camp Remagen guarding thousands of German soldiers captured in the Ruhr area on 25 April 1945

Site information
- Controlled by: U.S. Army; Wehrmachtordnungstruppe

Site history
- Built by: U.S. Army
- In use: April–September 1945
- Events: c. 1,000,000–1,900,000 prisoners

Garrison information
- Occupants: (Nazi Germany) Disarmed Enemy Forces

The Rheinwiesenlager (German: [ˈʁaɪnˌviːzn̩ˌlaːɡɐ]; lit. 'Rhine meadow camps') were a group of 19 camps built in the Allied-occupied part of Germany by the U.S. Army to hold captured German soldiers at the close of the Second World War. Officially named Prisoner of War Temporary Enclosures (PWTE), they held between one and almost two million surrendered Wehrmacht personnel from April until September 1945.

Prisoners held in the camps were designated disarmed enemy forces, not prisoners of war. This decision was made in March 1945 by SHAEF commander in chief Dwight D. Eisenhower: by not classifying the hundreds of thousands of captured troops as POWs, the logistical problems associated with accommodating so many prisoners of war mandated by the Geneva Convention governing their treatment were negated.

== Background ==
By early 1945 almost half of all German soldiers taken prisoner in the West were held by U.S. forces, while the other half were taken by the British and Canadians. But in late March 1945, as Allied forces struck into the heart of Germany after crossing the Rhine at Remagen, the number of German prisoners being processed caused the British to stop accepting any more prisoners into their camps. This forced the U.S. Army to take immediate action and establish the Rheinwiesenlager in the western part of Germany.

The creation of the camps was made easier because prisoners would be deemed Disarmed Enemy Forces (DEFs), a decision that had been made in March 1945 by Eisenhower. Captured soldiers would no longer have the rights of prisoners of war guaranteed to them under the Geneva Convention because they belonged to Nazi Germany, a state that had ceased to exist.

The camps were also established to stop any German insurgency following the surrender of Nazi Germany on 8 May 1945. The Allied leadership were worried that die-hard Nazi units might try to mount an effective guerrilla campaign against the occupation. Historian Perry Biddiscombe believed the decision to keep hundreds of thousands of men in poor conditions of the Rheinwiesenlager camps was "mainly to prevent Werwolf activity" in post-war Germany.

== Location of Rheinwiesenlager ==
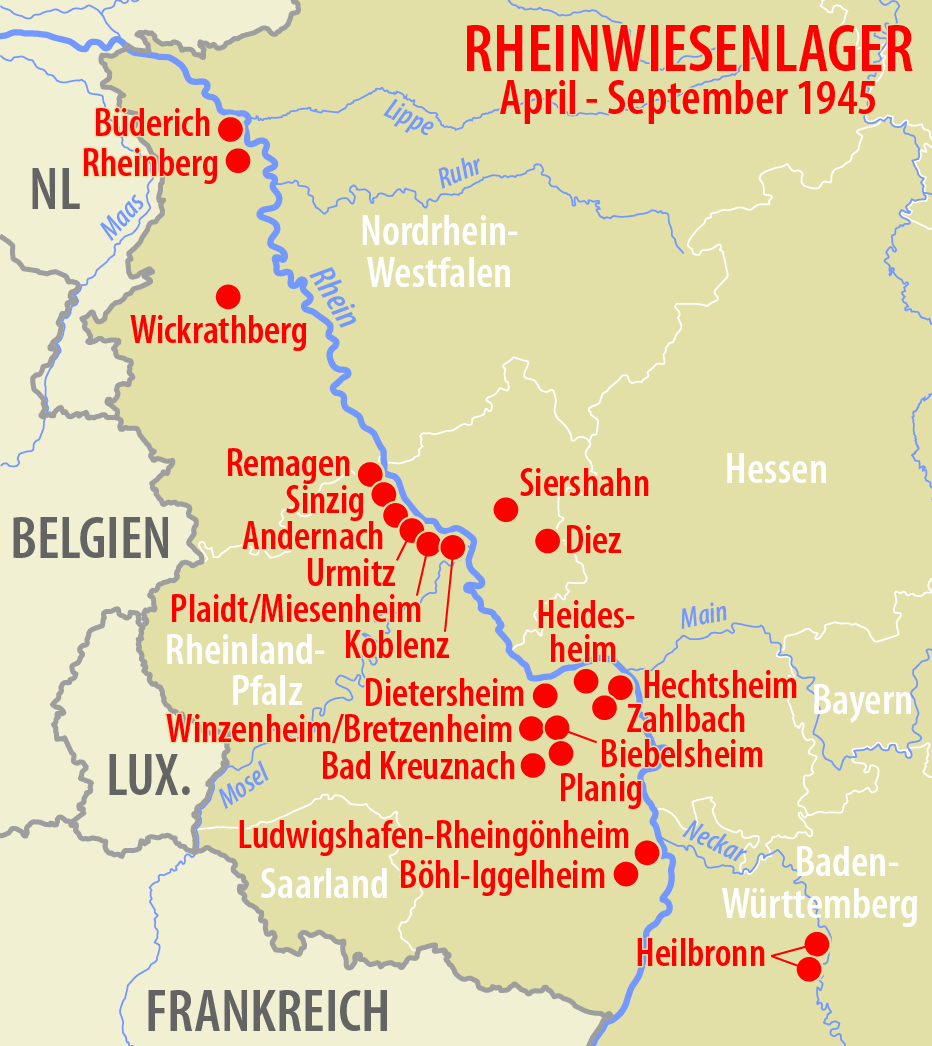
location of the Rheinwiesenlager

Listings are from north to south with official number

- A4 Büderich
- A1 Rheinberg
- A9 Wickrathberg
- A2 Remagen (the Golden Mile)
- A5 Sinzig
- Siershahn
- A11 A14 Andernach
- Diez
- A13 Urmitz
- A10 Koblenz
- A8 Dietersheim
- A12 Heidesheim
- A6 Winzenheim-Bretzenheim
- A16 A17 Hechtsheim
- A7 A15 Biebelsheim
- A3 Bad Kreuznach
- C1 Ludwigshafen
- C2 Böhl-Iggelheim
- C3 C4 Heilbronn

== Camp construction ==
In the beginning, there were plans to transport the prisoners of war to Britain, where they would remain until capitulation, because there they could be better provided for. After the failure of the Ardennes offensive, 250,000 German soldiers surrendered. After the breakdown of the Ruhr pocket another 325,000 were taken prisoner. After capitulation there were 3.4 million German soldiers in the custody of the Western Allies. With such large numbers of prisoners, it seemed more logical to keep them in Germany.

The camps were founded in April 1945 and remained in existence until September. There was a similar plan for the construction of all the camps. Open farmland close to a village with a railroad line was enclosed with barbed wire and divided into 10 to 20 camps, each housing 5,000 to 10,000 men. Existing field paths were used as streets of the camp and surrounding buildings as the administration, kitchen and hospital. The prisoners of war, forced to surrender their equipment, had to dig holes in the earth by hand in which to sleep. Soon the camps were grossly overcrowded; e.g., Camp Remagen, intended for 100,000, grew to 184,000 prisoners.

== Operations and management ==
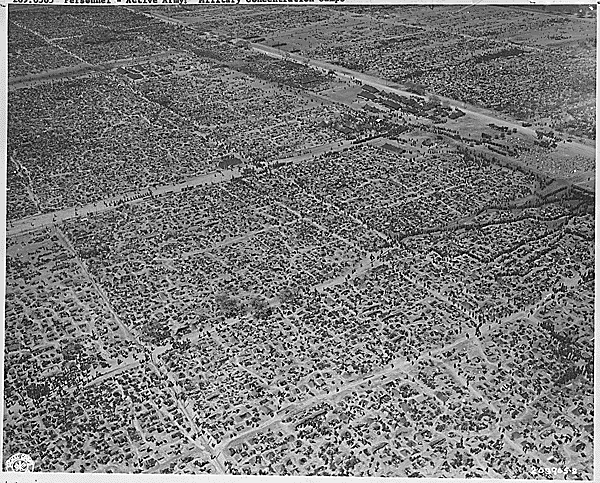
Aerial view of an unknown camp inside Allied-occupied Germany.

To circumvent international laws that dealt with the handling of POWs, the surrendered forces were termed "Disarmed Enemy Forces" (DEF) and the term "Prisoners of war" (POW) was not applied. The 106th US Infantry Division became responsible for guarding the prisoners. For this task, the 106th was reinforced to a strength of 40,000 men. Due to the numbers of prisoners, the Americans transferred internal control of the camps over to the Germans. All administration such as doctors, cooks and work forces was undertaken by the prisoners. Even some armed guards were former troops from the Wehrmacht's Feldgendarmerie and Feldjägerkorps. Known as Wehrmachtordnungstruppe (Armed Forces Order Troop), they received extra rations for preventing escapes and keeping order in the camps. In June 1946, these military police would be the last German soldiers to officially surrender their arms.

Within weeks of the camps being established, some prisoner releases were started. First to be allowed to leave were members of the Hitlerjugend and female personnel who were deemed to have no affiliation with the Nazi Party. Professional groups, such as farmers, drivers and miners, soon followed because they were urgently required to assist in the reconstruction of German infrastructure. By the end of June 1945, the camps at Remagen, Böhl-Iggelheim and Büderich had been emptied.

On 12 June 1945, the British forces took control of the two Rheinwiesenlager camps designated to be in the British Zone. On 10 July 1945, all releases were halted after SHAEF handed control of the camps over to the French. The deal was struck because the government of Charles de Gaulle wanted 1.75 million prisoners of war for forced labor in France. In total roughly 182,400 prisoners from Sinzig, Andernach, Siershahn, Bretzenheim, Dietersheim, Koblenz, Hechtzheim and Dietz were given to France. The British handed over those fit for work from the two camps they controlled at Büderich and Rheinberg, and released the remainder.

By the end of September 1945 nearly all the Rheinwiesenlager camps had been closed. Only a camp at Bretzenheim near Bad Kreuznach remained open until 1948, serving as a transit camp for German prisoners released from France.

== Conditions and death rates ==
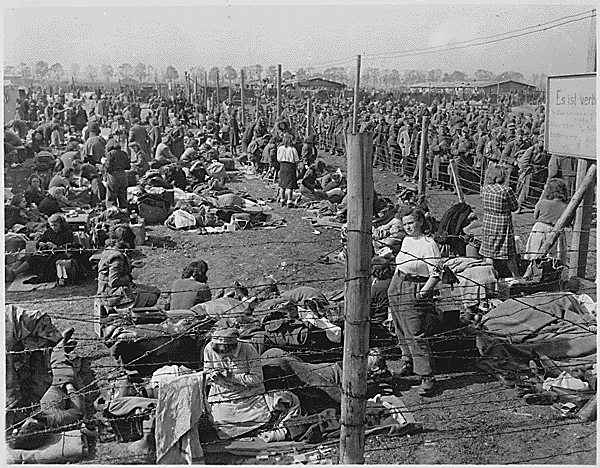
Women prisoners held in the Third U.S. Army enclosure at Regensburg, Germany, 8 May 1945.

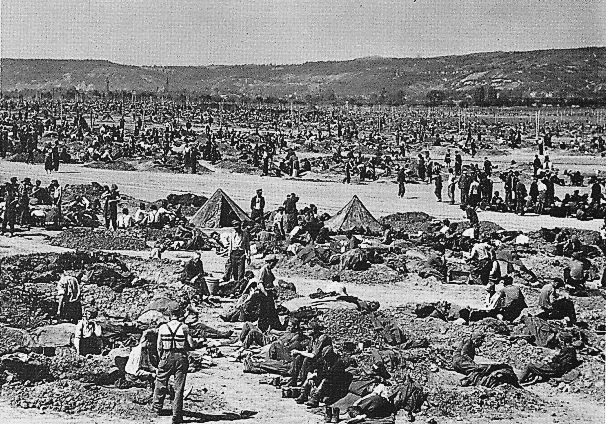
The exposed conditions within Sinzig POW camp, 16 May 1945.

Throughout the summer of 1945, the International Committee of the Red Cross (ICRC) was prevented from visiting prisoners in any of the Allies' Rheinwiesenlager. Visits were started only in the autumn of 1945, at a time when most camps had closed or were closing. The Red Cross was granted permission to send delegations to visit camps in the French and UK occupation zones. On 4 February 1946 the Red Cross was allowed to send relief to those in the U.S. run occupation zone. The International Red Cross website states "The quantities received by the ICRC for these captives remained very small, however. During their visits, the delegates observed that German prisoners of war were often detained in appalling conditions. They drew the attention of the authorities to this fact, and gradually succeeded in getting some improvements made." According to a report by the Army Medical Department, "Some of the enclosures resembled Andersonville Prison in 1864".

Official United States statistics conclude there were just over 3,000 deaths in the Rheinwiesenlager. A 1972 West German committee led by former Nazi Erich Maschke concluded that 4,537 died. American academic R. J. Rummel believes the figure is around 6,000. Canadian writer James Bacque claimed in his 1989 book Other Losses that the number is likely in the hundreds of thousands, and may be as high as 1,000,000. However, numerous historians, such as Stephen Ambrose, Albert E. Cowdrey and Rüdiger Overmans, have examined and rejected Bacque's claims, arguing that they were the result of faulty research practices. Writing in the Encyclopedia of Prisoners of War and Internment, military historian S.P. MacKenzie stated: "That German prisoners were treated very badly in the months immediately after the war […] is beyond dispute. All in all, however, Bacque's thesis and mortality figures cannot be taken as accurate".

The mortality rate of all the camps, except one, was between 0.6% and 0.8%.

In 1972, the Maschke committee published the official West German analysis. It had conducted detailed research of the camp histories on behalf of the Bundesministerium für Vertriebene, Flüchtlinge und Kriegsgeschädigte (German Federal Ministry of Displaced persons, Refugees, and War Victims). According to their results, the camps with the highest mortality were:

1. Bad Kreuznach (Lager Galgenberg und Bretzenheim)
2. Sinzig near Remagen
3. Rheinberg
4. Heidesheim
5. Wickrathberg
6. Büderich

An analysis of the documents of the local administrations around the camps of Remagen yields similar results.

The official death rate for Germans held by the American military was among the lowest experienced by surrendered combatants during and after the war, which is not surprising as the prisoners were held for only a few months.

== Postwar conclusions ==
In 1969, Lieutenant General Leonard D. Heaton prepared and published an exhaustive report for the United States Army Medical Department that examined preventive medicine and the problems associated with housing such a large number of German prisoners after World War II. The report found a number of problems, including:

- The army had lost track of some of the locations where POWs were held.
- The number of prisoners greatly exceeded expectations.
- Organization of the camps was left to prisoners.
- Food and water supplies were insufficient during April and May 1945, though they later improved.
- The 1200 to 1500 calories ration that the Disarmed Enemy Forces were receiving in August 1945 was inadequate although greater than that given by the Germans to Allied POWs and concentration camp inmates during the war.
- The lack of food led in some cases to "extensive malnutrition."

In 2003, historian Richard Dominic Wiggers argued that the Allies violated international law regarding the feeding of enemy civilians, and that they both directly and indirectly caused the unnecessary suffering and death of large numbers of civilians and prisoners in occupied Germany, guided partly by a spirit of postwar vengeance when creating the circumstances that contributed to their deaths.

== See also ==
- List of POW camps in occupied Germany
- Bad Nenndorf interrogation centre
