= Wolfgang Lüderitz =

Wolfgang Lüderitz may refer to:

- Wolfgang Lüderitz (composer) (1926–2012), German composer of choral music
- Wolfgang Lüderitz (pentathlete) (born 1936), German pentathlete
