= Mass killings by Nazi Germany =

Mass killings by Nazi Germany may refer to:

- The Holocaust
- Romani Holocaust
- German atrocities committed against Soviet prisoners of war
- Nazi crimes against the Polish nation

== See also ==
- German genocide (disambiguation)
