= Surrendered Enemy Personnel =

WWII term/designation

Surrendered Enemy Personnel (SEP) is a designation for captive enemy soldiers (similar to Disarmed Enemy Forces). It was most commonly used by British forces towards German forces in Europe, and towards Japanese and associated forces in Asia after the end of World War II.

On 1 March 1947, the U.S. stated that the SEPs should be regarded as POWs and be treated in accordance with the Geneva Conventions.

The designation of SEP allowed the Royal Navy to use the German command structure to facilitate the disbandment of the Kriegsmarine.

In the Malayan Emergency the UK also used the definition SEP, alongside Captured Enemy Personnel (CEP). The distinction made was that SEP were insurgents who surrendered to the British, while Captured Enemy Personnel were not. Both designations were treated as prisoners of war.

== See also ==
- Disarmed Enemy Forces
- Japanese Surrendered Personnel
- Prisoner of war
- Laws of war
