= List of World War II prisoner-of-war camps administered by France =

By the end and in the aftermath of World War II, POW camps administered by France existed in the territory of France and the zones of French occupation in Germany and in Austria.

Researcher Tarczai Béla gives the following list of POW camp locations.

== Austria ==
The French established prisoner of war camps in the French occupation zone of Austria, namely Vorarlberg and the Tyrol.

- Bregenz
- Feldkirch
- Gscheid (?)
- Lustenau
- Rum (near Innsbruck)
- Sankt Peter am Wimberg
- Wörgl

== Germany ==
- Ailingen
- Andernach
- Baden-Baden
- Ering
- Friedrichshafen
- Kehl
- Koblenz
- Lindau
- Murnau
- Offenburg
- Ostheim
- Saarbrücken

== France ==
- Agde
- Amboise
- Attichy
- Aubagne
- Auberchicourt, Nord
- Avignon
- Bar-sur-Aube
- Beaune-la-Rolande
- Besançon
- Béthune
- Breisac
- Brévannes
- Brienne-le-Château
- Brumath
- Caen
- Cahors
- Camp de Livron, Caylus, Tarn-et-Garonne
- Camp de Thoré
- Camp des Anamites
- Camp des Defends par Châteauroux
- Camp des Sables-Fortet
- Castres
- Châlons-sur-Marne
- Champenoise-Vigole
- Châteauroux
- Cherbourg
- Clermont-Ferrand
- Colmar
- Colombes
- Comper-en-Concoret
- Cormeilles-en-Parisis
- Cotentin
- Damigny
- Decise
- Dieppe
- Dijon
- Draguignan
- Épinal
- Ergm
- Espagot
- Évron
- Farges, Morbihan
- Ferrières-la-Verrerie
- Foix
- Fort de Cormeilles-en-Parisis
- Fort de Noisy-le-Sec, Romainville
- Fort Moselle
- Foucarville
- Fontainebleau
- Freisine
- Givers
- Grabyle
- Graffenstaden
- Grandville
- Haguenau
- Hatten
- Hénin-Liétard
- Hérault de Béziers
- La Bégude
- La Flèche
- La Trémouille pres Tulle
- Lamballe
- Le Havre
- Lens/Mericourt
- Liévin/Calonne
- Lille
- Lisle-sur-Tarn
- Lunéville
- Lyon
- Marckolsheim
- Marseville
- Märzwiller
- Méricourt
- Metz
- Mitrachin
- Montech
- Montélier
- Montier-en-Der
- Montoir-de-Bretagne, Brittany
- Mulhouse-St. Louis
- Mutzig
- N. Orléans
- Nice
- Nouvelle Annecy
- Parche
- Perpignan
- Préchac-sur-Adour
- Piemont
- Poitiers
- Quiéry-la-Motte
- Rennes
- Riquewihr
- Rittershoffen
- Rivesaltes
- Rouen
- Saint-Fons
- Saint-Jean-d'Angély
- Saint-Priest, Isère
- Satonay, Sausheim
- Sedan
- Sepmes
- Sermaize-les-Bains
- Sète /Montpellier, Hérault
- Strasbourg
- Toulouse
- Tours
- Vénissieux, Lyon
- Vernel
- Le Vernet, Ariège
- Versailles
- Ville de Pau
- Villemaur-sur-Vanne
- Vitry-le-François
- Voves
- Vuilnemin, Douai
