= Wickrathberg =

- Borough of Mönchengladbach
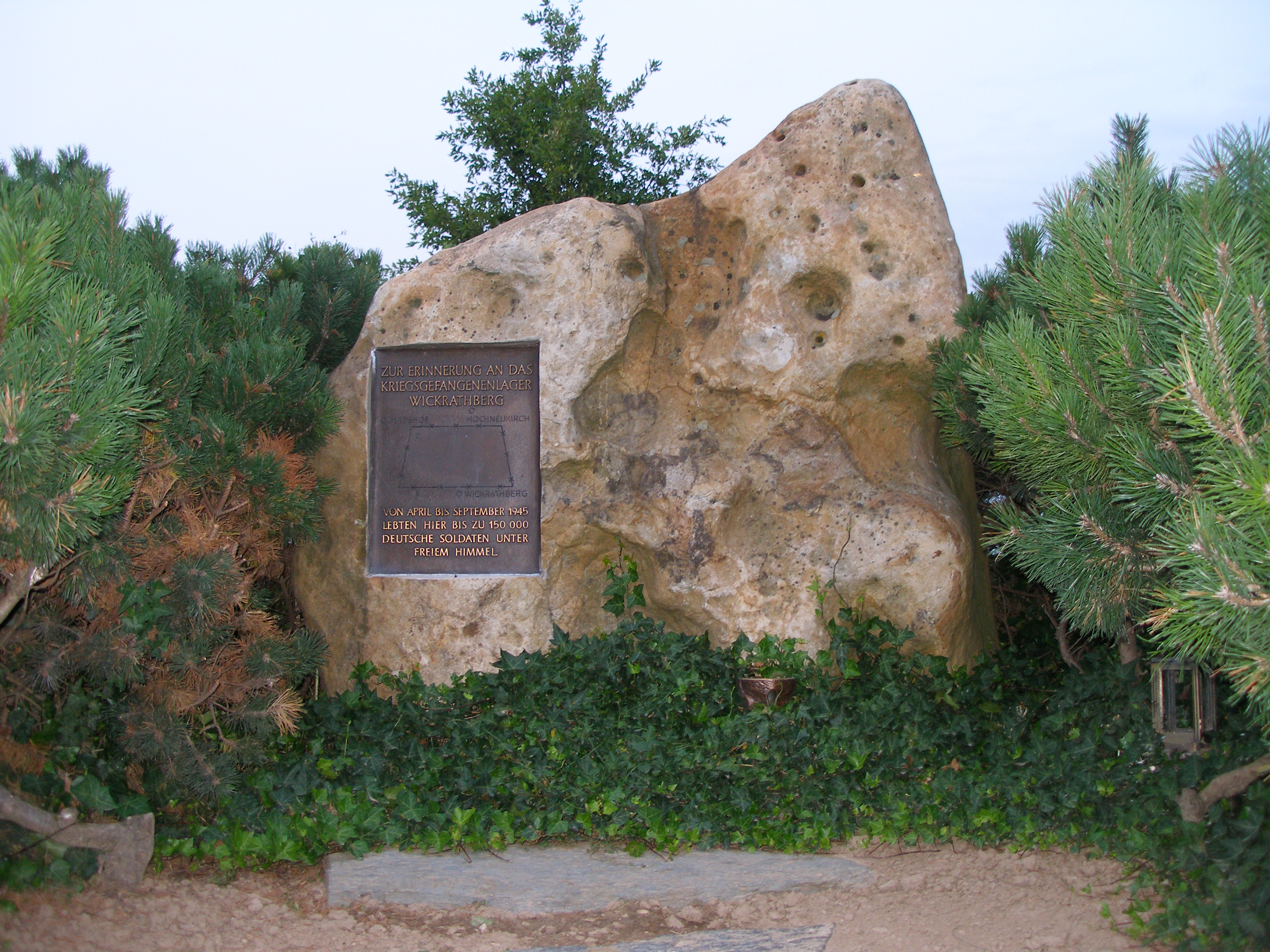
- Monument to the 1945 German prisoner of war camp in Wickrathberg.

- Location of Wickrathberg in Mönchengladbach
- Interactive map of Wickrathberg
- Location within Germany Location within North Rhine-Westphalia
- Coordinates: 51°7′N 06°25′E
- Country: Germany
- State: North Rhine-Westphalia
- Admin. region: Düsseldorf
- District: Urban district
- City: Mönchengladbach

Area
  - Total: 3.52 km^{2} (1.36 sq mi)

Population (2022-12-31)
  - Total: 2,185
  - Density: 621/km^{2} (1,610/sq mi)
- Time zone: UTC+01:00 (CET)
  - Summer (DST): UTC+02:00 (CEST)
- Postal codes: 41189
- Dialling codes: 02161, 02166

Wickrathberg is a borough of the German city Mönchengladbach, located in the west of North Rhine-Westphalia. The river Niers flows through the village.

== History ==
The village belonged to the manor of Wickrath in the Middle Ages and early modern times.

An important Jewish community existed in Wickrathberg since before 1704. There was a synagogue, a school and a Jewish cemetery in neighboring Wanlo. The Wickrathberg synagogue was destroyed during the Kristallnacht in November 1938. Only a memorial plaque remains in the pavement of Berger Dorfstraße. In the following years, the Jewish citizens were arrested and deported to concentration camps. By 1942, the 250-year-old Wickrathberg Jewish community had ceased to exist.

In 1945, after the end of the Second World War, the American army built a large temporary prisoner of war camp in the triangle between Güdderath, Hochneukirch and Wickrathberg, one of the so-called "Rheinwiesenlager". It held between 120,000 and 150,000 German prisoners of war from April to September 1945 in the open air.

== People who grew up in Wickrathberg ==
- Hilde Sherman (1923–2011), Jewish woman who survived the Holocaust.
- Wolfgang Lüderitz (1926–2012), composer.
