= Wolfgang Lüderitz (composer) =

German composer

Wolfgang Lüderitz (10 August 1926 – 7 September 2012) was a German composer of choral music.

== Life ==
Lüderitz was born in the village of Dudweiler in the territory of the Saar Basin, however he grew up in Wickrathberg near Mönchengladbach in Germany. There, he played the church organ already at the age of fifteen and later became a choirmaster. In 1951, he graduated as choirmaster from the Cologne University of Music and went on to study musicology at the University of Cologne from 1951 to 1954. Among his teachers there was Karl Gustav Fellerer. From 1956 until his death in 2012 he lived in the neighborhood of Porz in Cologne, where he was active as a choirmaster and church musician.

The first compositions by Wolfgang Lüderitz were published in 1954, but his works became more popular in Germany in the 1960s. In the mid-1980s, he had already published about 170 original compositions and derivative works of both secular and religious music, ranging from simple stanzaic songs to symphonic cantatas.
