= James Bacque =

Canadian writer (1929–2019)

James Watson Bacque (19 May 1929 – 13 September 2019) was a Canadian writer, publisher, and book editor. He was born in Toronto, Ontario.

== Early life ==
Bacque was educated at Upper Canada College in Toronto and then the University of Toronto, where he studied history and philosophy, graduating in 1952 with a Bachelor of Arts degree. He was a member of Seaton's House, one of the school's boarding houses.

== Fiction writing ==
Bacque was a mainstream fiction writer and essayist before turning his attention, in 1989, to the fate of German soldiers held as POWs by the Allies after World War II. His recent works include Dear Enemy (2000), with Richard Matthias Mueller, essays on Germany Then and Now. Bacque had just completed a comic drama for the stage entitled Conrad, about a media mogul in prison, which was scheduled for production on 2 October 2009 at the George Ignatieff Theatre in Toronto. Bacque's latest book, Putting On Conrad, about the experiences of producers trying to put on his play in the face of libel chill, is an amusing satire on Canada's literary establishment.

== Other Losses ==
In Other Losses (1989), Bacque claimed that Allied Supreme Commander Dwight Eisenhower's policies caused the death of 790,000 German captives in internment camps through disease, starvation and cold from 1944 to 1949. In similar French camps some 250,000 more are said to have perished. The International Committee of the Red Cross was refused entry to the camps, Switzerland was deprived of its status as "protecting power" and POWs were reclassified as "Disarmed Enemy Forces" to circumvent recognition under the Geneva Convention. Bacque argued that this alleged mass murder was a direct result of the policies of the western Allies, who, with the Soviets, ruled as the Military Occupation Government over partitioned Germany from May 1945 until 1949. He laid the blame on Gen. Dwight D. Eisenhower, saying Germans were kept on starvation rations even though there was enough food in the world to avert the lethal shortage in Germany in 1945–1946.

=== Academic criticism ===
Academic reviewers question three major aspects of Bacque's work: his claims that there was no post-war food shortage in other European countries; Bacque's estimate of the number of German deaths; and the allegation that Eisenhower was deliberately vindictive. Bacque's critics note many of the German soldiers were sick and wounded at the time of their surrender, and say his work does not place the plight of the German prisoners within the context of the grim situation in Western Europe in 1945 and 1946.

Writing in the Canadian Historical Review, David Stafford called the book "a classic example of a worthwhile investigation marred by polemic and overstatement." R.J. Rummell, a scholar of 20th-century atrocities, has written that "Bacque misread, misinterpreted, or ignored the relevant documents and that his mortality statistics are simply impossible." More recently, writing in the Encyclopedia of Prisoners of War and Internment, S. P. MacKenzie states, "That German prisoners were treated very badly in the months immediately after the war […] is beyond dispute. All in all, however, Bacque's thesis and mortality figures cannot be taken as accurate".

Eisenhower biographer Stephen Ambrose, who helped edit Other Losses, wrote "I quarrel with many of your interpretations, [but] I am not arguing with the basic truth of your discovery" and acknowledged that Bacque had made a "major historical discovery", in the sense that very little attention had hitherto been paid to the treatment of German POWs in Allied hands. He acknowledged he did not now support Bacque's conclusions, but said at the American Military Institute's Annual Meeting in March 1990:

"Bacque has done some research and uncovered an important story that I, and other American historians, missed altogether in work on Eisenhower and the conclusion of the war. When those millions of Wehrmacht soldiers came into captivity at the end of the war, many of them were deliberately and brutally mistreated. There is no denying this. There are men in this audience who were victims of this mistreatment. It is a story that has been kept quiet."

However, in a 1991 New York Times book review, Ambrose stated:

"when scholars do the necessary research, they will find Mr. Bacque's work to be worse than worthless. It is seriously—nay, spectacularly—flawed in its most fundamental aspects. […] Mr. Bacque is wrong on every major charge and nearly all his minor ones. Eisenhower was not a Hitler, he did not run death camps, German prisoners did not die by the hundreds of thousands, there was a severe food shortage in 1945, there was nothing sinister or secret about the "disarmed enemy forces" designation or about the column "other losses." Mr. Bacque's "missing million" were old men and young boys in the Volkssturm (People's Militia) released without formal discharge and transfers of POWs to other allies control areas."

A book-length disputation of Bacque's work, entitled Eisenhower and the German POWs, appeared in 1992, featuring essays by British, American, and German historians.

Despite the criticisms of Bacque's methodology, Stephen Ambrose and Brian Loring Villa, the authors of the chapter on German POW deaths, conceded the Allies were motivated in their treatment of captured Germans by disgust and revenge for German atrocities. They did, however, argue Bacque's casualty figures are far too high, and that policy was set by Allied politicians, not by Eisenhower.

Stephen Ambrose said, "we as Americans can't duck the fact that terrible things happened. And they happened at the end of a war we fought for decency and freedom, and they are not excusable."

Jonathan Osmond, writing in the Journal of the Royal Institute of International Affairs, said:

"Bacque […] has published a corrective to the impression that the Western allies after the Second World War behaved in a civilised manner to the conquered Germans […] It is clear that he has opened up once more a serious subject dominated by the explanations of those in power. Even if two-thirds of the statistical discrepancies exposed by Bacque could be accounted for by the chaos of the situation, there would still be a case to answer."

Osmond also called the book "emotive and journalistic".

One of the historians in support of Bacque was Colonel Ernest F. Fisher, 101st Airborne Division, who in 1945 took part in investigations into allegations of misconduct by U.S. troops in Germany and later became a Senior Historian with the United States Army. In the foreword to the book he states:

"More than five million German soldiers in the American and French zones were crowded into barbed wire cages, many of them literally shoulder to shoulder. The ground beneath them soon became a quagmire of filth and disease. Open to the weather, lacking even primitive sanitary facilities, underfed, the prisoners soon began dying of starvation and disease. Starting in April 1945, the United States Army and the French Army casually annihilated about one million men, most of them in American camps."

== Crimes and Mercies ==
In a subsequent book, Crimes And Mercies (1997), Bacque claimed that Allied policies led to the premature deaths of 5.7 million civilians among the indigenous population of East and West Germany (in excess of recorded mortality) between censuses in October 1946 and September 1950, 2.5 million ethnic German refugees from Eastern Europe and 1.1 million German POWs due to Allied starvation and expulsion policies in the five years following World War II.

The book also details the charity work conducted by the Allies, primarily Canada and the United States, crediting it with saving or improving the lives of up to 500 million people around the world in the post war period. This work was led by Herbert Hoover at the behest of President Truman, and by the Canadian Prime Minister, Mackenzie King, together with Norman Robertson and Mitchell Sharp. This was the largest relief program ever organized, and expressed the ideals of many of the allied combatants.

Bacque's figures for prisoners of war and expellees are in excess of those accepted by historians, and his claim of 5.7 million unrecorded civilian deaths in East and West Germany between 1946 and 1950 censuses has no correspondence at all in historical literature. A review of "Crimes and Mercies" by German historian Bernd Greiner considers the aforementioned 5.7 million claim to have no substance, contextualizes Bacque's book with attempts of the extreme right to gain mainstream acceptance, and expresses surprise at historians' passivity in the face of such tendencies ("Es ist mehr als erstaunlich, wie Wolfgang Wippermann unlängst zu Recht anmerkte, daß die seriösen Fachhistoriker diesem Treiben noch immer ungerührt zusehen."). A panel of scholars gathered at the annual German Studies Association meeting in Salt Lake City in October 1999 and found the charges of "Crimes and Mercies" even more extravagant than those proffered in "Other Losses". The panel's papers were never published, however, since the participants thought that the business of refuting Bacque's claims again and again and in detail gives more credence to his wild conspiracy history, and trying to revive the debate was yet another attempt by him to gain acceptability in the scholarly community.

According to the German Federal Archives in 1956, more than 2 million refugees/expellees from the eastern territories of the former German Reich in its 1937 borders and from ethnic German minorities outside Germany's 1937 borders perished during and after the war. However, this order of magnitude is under considerable dispute by historians.

== Bibliography: books and selected articles ==
=== Fiction ===
- The Lonely Ones (Toronto: McClelland and Stewart, 1969) London: Macmillan, 1970. First paperback edition published under the title: Big Lonely (Toronto: new press, 1971). Second paperback edition, #148 in the New Canadian Library series; foreword by D.M.R. Bentley. Toronto: McClelland and Stewart, 1978.
- A Man of Talent (Toronto, new press, 1972). Fiction.
- The Queen Comes to Minnicog (Toronto: Gage, 1979). 177 p. Short stories.
- Our Fathers' War; A Novel (Toronto: Exile Editions, 2006). 628 pp. A novel of World War II.

=== Contributions to books ===
- Kroetsch, Robert, James Bacque, and Pierre Gravel, creation. Toronto: new press, 1970. CONTENTS (James Bacque contributions): "The High Snow," pp. 67–72; "A small Film," 73–80; "Sun and Earth for a Dollar," 81–88; "the truth shall make you weird [sic]," 88–97; "On the morning of the death of Colonel Alexander Ramsay, O.B.E.," 98–114; "The Nancy Poems," 115–119; "A Conversation with Milton Wilson," 120–146.
- Litteljohn, Bruce M., and Jon Pearce. 1973. Marked by the Wild; An Anthology of Literature shaped by the Canadian Wilderness. [Toronto]: McClelland and Stewart, 1973. Includes excerpt from James Bacque's The Lonely Ones on pp. 144–147.
- Bailey, Don, and Daile Unruh. 1991. Great Canadian Murder and Mystery Stories. Kingston, Ont: Quarry Press, 1991. Includes James Bacque's "Desire and Knowledge in Key West," pp. 150–158.
- Kick, Russell. 2003. Abuse your Illusions: The Disinformation Guide to Media Mirages and Establishment Lies. New York: Disinformation Co., 2003. Includes James Bacque's "A Truth so Terrible: Atrocities against German POWs and civilians during and after WWII," on pp. 261–267.

=== History: books and selected articles ===
- James Bacque, "The Last Dirty Secret of World War Two," Saturday Night, v. 204, no. 9, whole no. 3714 (September 1989) 31–38. For related stories, (Sept. 1989) issue, see John Fraser, "Diary: Slow Death Camps," pp. 13–14; also John Gault, "A Story he [Bacque] didn't Want to Know," pp. 43–46. For the response of readers and former POWs to these allegations, see also "Eisenhower's Death Camps: Our Readers Kick up a Fuss (cover title)," v. 104, no. 12, whole no. 3717 (Dec. 1989) entitled "Other Losses: Letters," pp. 7–13.
- Other Losses; An Investigation into the Mass Deaths of German Prisoners at the Hands of the French and Americans after World War II (Toronto: Stoddart, 1989; London: MacDonald, 1989). Futura paperback (London: MacDonald, 1991); General Paperjack (Don Mills: General, 1991).
- Just Raoul; Adventures in the French Resistance (Toronto: Stoddart, 1990). Also Just Raoul; The Private War Against the Nazis of Raoul Laporterie, Who Saved Over 1,600 Lives in France (Rocklin, CA: Prima, 1992).
- Der geplante Tod; Deutsche Kriegsgefangene in amerikanischen und französischen Lagern 1945–1946. Aus dem Kanadischen übertragen von Sophie und Erwin Duncker Berlin: Ullstein, 1989. Translation of Other Losses. Expanded and revised paperback edition (9th printing), Berlin: Ullstein, 2002.
- Other Losses; The Shocking Truth behind the Mass Deaths of Disarmed German Soldiers and Civilians under General Eisenhower's Command (Rocklin, CA: Prima, 1992). On cover: Foreword by Dr. Ernest F. Fisher, Jr. Col. A.U.S. (Ret.), formerly a Senior Historian, U.S. Army.
- Verschwiegene Schuld: die alliierte Besatzungspolitik in Deutschland nach 1945. Vorwort von Alfred de Zayas. Übersetzung aus dem Englischen: Hans-Ulrich Seebohm. Frankfurt am Main: Ullstein, 1995. Translation of: Crimes and Mercies. The first edition of Crimes and Mercies; the original English version was published two years later.
- Crimes and Mercies; the Fate of German Civilians Under Allied Occupation, 1944–1950 (Boston: Toronto; Little, Brown, 1997). Also published as paperback: London: Little Brown, 1997; London: Warner, 1998, reprinted 1999; Vancouver: Talonbooks, 2007.
- Other Losses; An Investigation into the Mass Deaths of German Prisoners at the Hands of the French and Americans after World War II. 2. rev. edition. Bolton, ON: Fenn, 1999. Includes "Foreword" by Col. Ernest F. Fisher, xix–xxi; also "Introduction to the second revised edition," by James Bacque, xxiii–lxx. Projected new edition: Vancouver: Talonbooks, 2011.
- James Bacque and Richard Matthias Müller, Dear Enemy; Germany Then and Now (Bolton, ON: Fenn, 2000). The published correspondence of James Bacque of Canada and Richard Matthias Müller of Germany.
- Verschwiegene Schuld; Die alliierte Besatzungspolitik in Deutschland nach 1945. Vorwort von Alfred de Zayas. Überseztung aus dem Englischen: Hans-Ulrich Seebohm. Selent: Pour le Mérite, 2002. Translation of: Crimes and Mercies.
- Der geplante Tod; Deutsche Kriegsgefangene in amerikanischen und französischen Lagern, 1945–1946. Aus der englischen Sprache übersetzt von Sophie und Erwin Dunker, Anette [i.e., Annette] Roser. Selent: Pour le Mérite, 2008. Translation of: Other Losses.

== See also ==
- Morgenthau Plan – Post-World War II demilitarization plan for Germany
- Rheinwiesenlager – Prisoner of war camps used by Allied forces late in WWII
- Germany Must Perish! – 1941 anti-German book by Theodore N. Kaufman
- Bad Nenndorf – Town in Lower Saxony, Germany
