= Mainz-Hechtsheim =

- Borough of Mainz
- Location of Mainz-Hechtsheim within Mainz
- Interactive map of Mainz-Hechtsheim
- Location within Germany Location within Rhineland-Palatinate
- Coordinates: 49°57′37″N 8°16′49″E
- Country: Germany
- State: Rhineland-Palatinate
- District: Urban district
- City: Mainz

Government
  - Mayor (2019–24): Ulrike Cohnen (CDU)

Area
  - Total: 14.043 km^{2} (5.422 sq mi)

Population (2024)
  - Total: 15,655
  - Density: 1,114.8/km^{2} (2,887.3/sq mi)
- Time zone: UTC+01:00 (CET)
  - Summer (DST): UTC+02:00 (CEST)
- Postal codes: 55129
- Dialling codes: 06131
- Website: mainz.de

Hechtsheim is a borough of the Rhineland-Palatinate state capital Mainz, Germany. With an area of 1,404 hectares, it is the largest district in the city.

== History ==
On 17 May 808, Hehhidesheim was first mentioned in writing by the Princely Abbey of Fulda. However, like other "-heim" places in Rheinhessen, it was probably founded much earlier.

On the Hechtsheimer Höhe, since then called Frankenhöhe, around 300 graves from the period around 500 AD to the second half of the 7th century AD were excavated between 1980 and 1983 by the Mainz State Archaeology Department under the direction of Dr. Gerd Rupprecht. In the beginning of the 20th Century, several graveyards, containing weapons, arrowheads and broken ceramic vessels from the Frankish period were also found inside the village.

On 20 December 1943, Hechtsheim was bombed for the first time and the town was badly damaged. On 19 October and 28 December 1944, the town was bombed again. The American Army occupied the Hechtsheim district on 21 March 1945.

After the end of the Second World War, the American Army established a Rheinwiesenlager (Prisoner camp) in Hechtsheim in May 1945. This was one of 23 camps in which more than a million former Wehrmacht soldiers were interned. The Hechtsheim camp was located below the communications barracks built in 1938 - today's Kurmainz barracks. Around 25,000 Wehrmacht members, mainly from the Sudetenland and Hungary, were housed in the camp. The lives of the prisoners of war were marked by hunger, disease and inadequate hygienic conditions. In the initial phase, most prisoners had to camp unprotected in the open air for weeks. The US Army was responsible for this camp from May to 9 July 1945. Then French forces took over until it was dissolved in October/November 1945. At least 171 prisoners died, which were buried in the Hechtsheim cemetery.

After the Second World War and the new reorganisation of the region, Hechtsheim became a municipality in the district of Mainz (Rhineland-Palatinate). In the 1950s, it benefited from the development of its commercial area. In 1969, Hechtsheim was incorporated into the city of Mainz as a district (Ortsbezirk) called Mainz-Hechtsheim.
