= Disarmed Enemy Forces =

Redesignation of Prisoners of War to avoid Geneva Convention responsibilities

Disarmed Enemy Forces (DEF, less commonly, Surrendered Enemy Forces) is a US designation for soldiers who surrender to an adversary after hostilities end, and for those POWs who had already surrendered and were held in camps in occupied German territory at the time. It was General Dwight D. Eisenhower's designation of German prisoners in post–World War II occupied Germany.

Because of the logistical difficulties of feeding all of the nearly two million of surrendered German soldiers at the levels required by the Geneva Convention during the food crisis of 1945, the purpose of the designation, along with the British designation of Surrendered Enemy Personnel (SEP), was to prevent categorization of the prisoners as prisoners of war (POW) under the 1929 Geneva Convention.

== Germany at the end of the war ==
Food and agriculture in Nazi Germany had declined greatly in 1944 and 1945. Germany had mobilized for total war, and food for the troops and war workers was vital to the war. A shortage of synthetic fertilizers had developed after nitrogen and phosphate stocks were channeled into ammunition (explosives) production, and much of the potato crop was requisitioned to produce ethanol fuel for the military's V-2 arsenal. Consequently, crop levels had fallen by 20% to 30% at the end of the war. Allied bombing raids had destroyed thousands of farm buildings, and rendered food processing facilities inoperable. Lack of farm machinery, spare parts, and fertilizer caused an almost total disruption of agriculture when the war was over. After the release of Ostarbeiters, slave laborers that were Soviet POWs and Eastern Europeans, extreme agriculture labor shortages existed that could be relieved only by German DEFs and SEPs. Roving bands of displaced persons and returning soldiers and civilians decimated the hog herds and chicken flocks of German farmers.

The destroyed German transportation infrastructure created additional logistical difficulties, with railroad lines, bridges, canals and terminals left in ruins. The turnaround time for railroad wagons was five times higher than the prewar average. Of the 15,600 German locomotives, 38.6% were no longer operating and 31% were damaged. Only 1,000 of the 13,000 kilometers of track in the British zone were operable. Urban centers often had to be supplied with horse-drawn carriages and wheeled carts.

By May 8, 1945, the Allies had become responsible for the health and wellbeing of 7 million displaced persons in Germany and 1.6 million in Austria, including slave laborers from all over Europe. Soon thereafter, German populations had swollen by 12 to 14.5 million ethnic Germans expelled from Eastern Europe by the Soviet Union. Bavarian villages in the American zone faced 15% to 25% population increases from displaced persons, with Munich alone having to deal with 75,000 displaced persons.

The worst dislocation of agriculture was caused by the German zonal partitions, which cut off Western Germany from its "breadbasket" of farm lands east of the Oder-Neisse line that had accounted for 35% of Germany's prewar food production, and which the Yalta Conference had given to Poland to compensate for lands of Eastern Poland. The Soviet Union, with millions of its own starving citizens at home, was not willing to distribute this production to the population in western Germany. In January 1945, the basic German ration was 1,625 calories/day, and that was further reduced to 1,100 calories by the end of the war in the British zone, and remained at that level into the summer, with levels varying from 840 calories/day in the Ruhr to 1,340 calories/day in Hamburg. The situation was no better in the American zones of Germany and Austria.

These problems combined to create severe shortages across Germany. One summary report estimated that just prior to Victory in Europe (V-E) Day, German consumer daily caloric intake was only 1,050, and that after V-E Day it dropped to 860 calories per day, though actual estimates are confusing because of the wide variation by location and because unofficial estimates were usually higher. It was clear by any measure that, by the spring of 1945, the German population was existing on rations that would not sustain life in the long term. A July 1945 CCAC report stated that "the food situation in western Germany is perhaps the most serious problem of the occupation. Average consumption is now about one third below the general accepted subsistence level of 2000 calories per day."

In the spring of 1946 the International Red Cross was finally allowed to provide limited amounts of food aid to prisoners of war in the U.S. occupation zone. By June 1948, DEF rations had been increased to 1990 calories and in December 1949 rationing was effectively discontinued and the food crisis was over.

== Number of surrenders in World War II ==
Approximately 35 million POWs were taken in World War II, 11 million of them Germans. In addition to 20 million dislocated citizens, the U.S. Army had to cope with most of the surrendered German military forces. While the Allies had anticipated 3 million surrendering Germans, the actual total was as many as 5 million in American hands by June 1945 out of 7.6 million in northwestern Europe alone, not counting the 1.4 million in Allied hands in Italy. Approximately 1 million were Wehrmacht soldiers fleeing west to avoid capture by the Red Army.

The number of Germans surrendering to U.S. forces shot up from 313,000 by the end of the first quarter of 1945, to 2.6 million by April 1945, and more than 5 million in May. By April 1945, entire German Army groups were surrendering, which overwhelmed Allied shipping such that German prisoners could no longer be sent to POW camps in America after March 1945. According to a June 22, 1945, announcement by the Allies, a total of 7,614,914 prisoners (of all designations) were held in French, British and American camps.

Although the British and Americans agreed to split the western Germans who surrendered, the British recanted arguing that they "did not have places to keep them or men to guard them on the continent, and that moving them to England would arouse public resentment and adversely affect British morale." By June 1, 1945, Eisenhower reported to the War Office that this refusal produced shortages in the 25 million prisoner-day rations which were growing at the rate of 900,000 prisoner-day rations. Feeding this number of people became a logistical nightmare for SHAEF, which frequently had to resort to improvisation.

== Early considerations of DEF designations ==
Regarding the adherence to the Geneva Convention for vanquished Germans, Churchill at the Casablanca Conference in 1943 summed up the Allies’ "unconditional surrender" policy with "If we are bound, we are bound by our consciences to civilization." In prosecuting the war, SHAEF carried out the decisions of the Combined (Anglo-American) Chiefs of Staff (CCS). They had to execute the directives of the European Advisory Commission (EAC), which included the Soviet Union. The CCS and EAC directives implemented policies of the heads of government who decided the most important questions of Allied occupation policy. After the EAC was set up by the 1943 Moscow Conference, it drafted the instruments of unconditional surrender. During the EAC debates the Allies determined that they could strip the Germans of all government, including their protection by international law, and be free to punish them without restriction. The Geneva Convention (GC) required SHAEF to feed German POWs a ration equal to its own base soldiers.

The original discussion of the Allies treating post-Victory in Europe (V-E) Day prisoners of war as something other than those protected by the Geneva Convention had its vague origins in the Casablanca Conference, but it was given specific form by the EAC in the summer of 1944 in a "draft instrument of surrender" given to the American government. The instrument required the surrendering German commander to accept that his men "shall at the discretion of the Commander in Chief of the Armed Forces of the Allied State concerned be declared to be Prisoners of War." Several factors went into this consideration, including that the EAC member the Soviet Union refused to sign the Geneva Conventions, despite intense pressure from 1942 onward to sign the document. Behind the Soviets' refusal were a number of considerations closely linked with the regime, but a major consideration that emerged at the Tehran Conference was that Soviet leader Joseph Stalin desired four million German laborers for an "indefinite period", perhaps for life. The Soviets' refusal to even consider signing the GC created great problems for the EAC, including the fact that a single surrender instrument could not be drafted if a Soviet commander taking the surrender could not possibly commit his government to accord GC rights to prisoners. As a result, the EAC instruments promised nothing in that regard, employed awkward and tortured language and made plain the premeditated Allied evasion of the Geneva Convention. In addition, other Allies also considered using Germans for prison labor, which the Germans themselves had already required of prisoners they had held during the war. Later EAC documents described the "Disabled Enemy Forces".

== DEF and SEP designations ==
With regard to food requirements, regardless of the reasoning or GC legal requirements, SHAEF was simply not capable of feeding all of the millions of German prisoners at the level of Allied base soldiers because of the high numbers and lack of resources. This was not deliberate policy, but the result of wartime damage to the infrastructure, which created the difficult problem of feeding the defeated peoples without it. In a March 10, 1945, cable to the CCS, Eisenhower requested permission for this designation per the earlier EAC documents, and was granted such permission. When the CCS approved Eisenhower's March 1945 request, it added that prisoners after Victory in Europe (V-E Day) should not be declared "Prisoners of War" under the Geneva Convention because of the lack of food.

The CCS then cabled British Field Marshal Sir Harold Alexander, supreme Allied Commander in the Mediterranean, suggesting that the same steps be taken regarding the German surrenders in Austria, and then approved Alexander's similar request for a DEF designation, stating "in view of the difficulties regarding food and accommodation, it was so decided." Eisenhower's JCS superiors ordered him to change German POWs' designation to "disarmed enemy forces" (DEF), just as British chiefs had done, redesignating their prisoners "Surrendered Enemy Personnel" (SEP). Alexander then requested that the CCS let British forces use such a designation for the surrender of German forces in Italy, the CCS granted his request and the conditions of such surrenders to British commander General Sir William D. Moran almost prevented the surrenders from occurring for worried German troops. The CCS submitted the DEF designations for study to the Combined Civilian Affairs Committee (CCAC), which not only concurred with the designation, but went further, suggesting that the status of all German POWs be retroactively lifted after the German surrender.

By June 22, 1945, of the 7,614,914 prisoners (of all designations) held in British and American camps, 4,209,000 were soldiers captured before the German capitulation and considered "POWs". This leaves approximately 3.4 million DEFs and SEPs, who according to Allied agreements, were supposed to be split between Britain and the United States. As of June 16, 1945, the U.S., France, and the U.K. held a combined total of 7,500,000 German POWs and DEFs. By June 18, the U.S. had discharged 1,200,000 of these.

== Aftermath ==
After the DEF designations were made in the early summer of 1945, the International Red Cross was not permitted to fully involve itself in the situation in camps containing German prisoners (POWs, DEFs or SEPs), some of which initially were Rheinwiesenlager transit camps, and even though conditions in them gradually improved, "even the most conservative estimates put the death toll in French camps alone at over 16,500 in 1945".

The Geneva Convention was amended. Articles 6 and 7 of the Convention relative to the Treatment of Prisoners of War, Geneva July 27, 1929, had covered what may and may not be done to a prisoner on capture. The wording of the 1949 Third Geneva Convention was intentionally altered from that of the 1929 convention so that soldiers who "fall into the power" following surrender or mass capitulation of an enemy are now protected as well as those captured in the course of fighting.

Most captives of the Americans and the British were released by the end of 1948, and most of those in French and Soviet captivity were released by the end of 1949, although the last big release occurred in 1956. According to the section of the German Red Cross dealing with tracing the captives, the ultimate fate of 1,300,000 German POWs in Allied custody (mostly American) is still unknown; they are still officially listed as missing and were never found.

== Historical precedents ==
After defeating Poland in 1939, and Yugoslavia two years later, many troops from those nations were "released" from POW status by Nazi Germany and turned into a "virtual conscript labor force".

Germany had either broken up or absorbed the countries in question, and the German argument was that neither country remained as a recognized state to which the POWs could still claim to belong, and that since belonging to a recognized nation was a formal prerequisite for POW status, "former Polish and Yugoslav military personnel were not legally prisoners of war".

The Allied argument for retracting Geneva convention protection from the German soldiers was similar to that of Nazi Germany vis à vis Polish and Yugoslav soldiers; using the "disappearance of the Third Reich to argue that the convention no longer operated-that POW status did not apply to the vast majority who had passed into captivity on and after May 5". The motive was twofold: both an unwillingness to follow the Geneva convention now that the threat of German reprisals against Allied POWs was gone, and also they were "to an extent unable to meet the high standards of the Geneva code" for the large number of captured Germans.

Following the surrender of Italy to the Allies in September 1943, German forces took around one million Italian military personnel prisoner. These personnel were designated "Italian military internees" and not granted the rights of POWs under the Geneva Conventions, as the German government claimed that they were not POWs as the two countries had not been at war. This continued, despite Italy’s subsequent declaration of war on Germany on October 13, 1943. Approximately 600,000 of the captured Italians were subsequently transported to Germany and required to work as forced labourers in generally harsh conditions.

== See also ==
- Debellatio (destruction of a sovereign state after war)
- Surrendered Enemy Personnel (the UK equivalent)
- Surrendered Italian personnel (Italian military personnel treated as forced labourers by Nazi Germany)
- Japanese Surrendered Personnel
- Foreign forced labor in the Soviet Union
- Forced labour under German rule during World War II
- Food and agriculture in Nazi Germany
- Prisoner of war
- Enemy combatant (designation used in early 21st century to similarly circumvent Geneva Convention protections)
