= Geneva Convention on Prisoners of War =

1929 international agreement

1929 Geneva Convention on Prisoners of War
Convention relative to the Treatment of Prisoners of War
- Type: Multilateral treaty
- Signed: 27 July 1929
- Location: Geneva, Switzerland
- Effective: 19 June 1931
- Replaced by: Third Geneva Convention of 1949
- Depositary: Switzerland

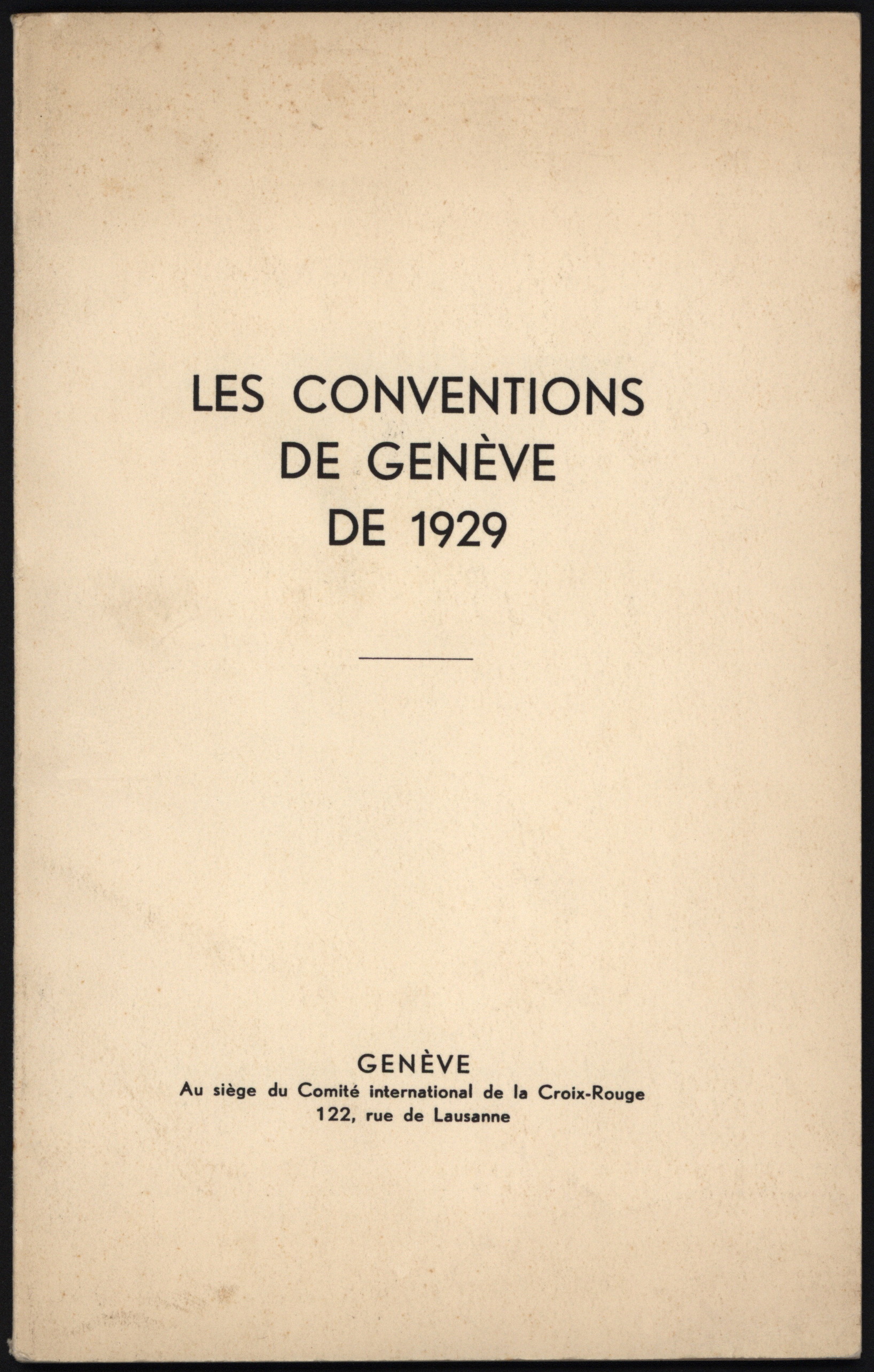
Front page of a French edition of the 1929 Geneva Convention

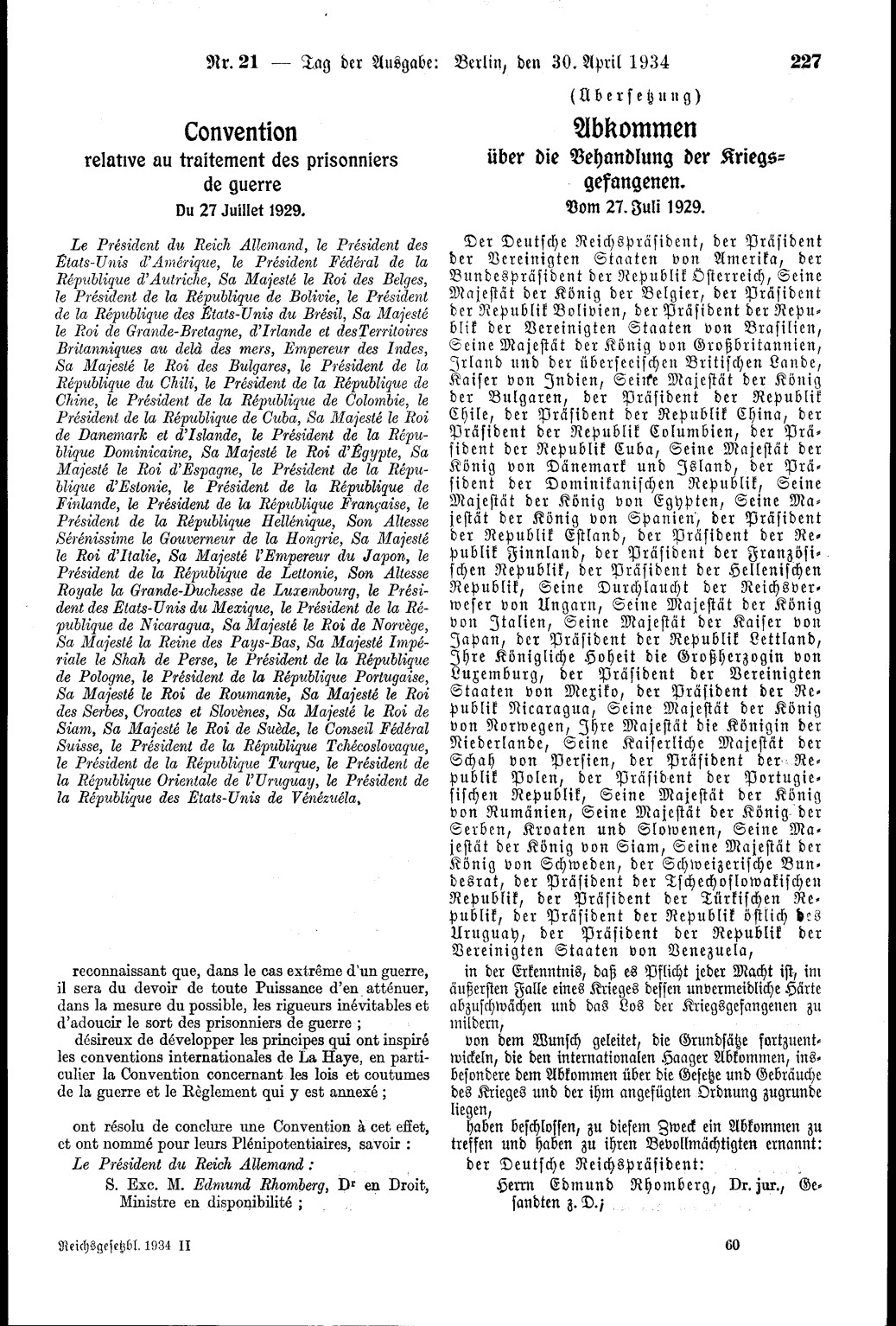
Bilingual French/German version of the 1929 Geneva Convention, from a 1934 edition of the Reichsgesetzblatt

The Geneva Convention on Prisoners of War was signed at Geneva on 27 July 1929. Its official name is the Convention relative to the Treatment of Prisoners of War. It entered into force on 19 June 1931. It is this version of the Geneva Conventions which covered the treatment of prisoners of war during World War II. It is the predecessor of the Third Geneva Convention signed in 1949.

The International Committee of the Red Cross states that:

Provisions concerning the treatment of prisoners of war are contained in the Hague Regulations of 1899 and 1907. In the course of World War I they revealed several deficiencies as well as a lack of precision. Such defects were partly overcome by special agreements made between belligerents in Berne in 1917 and 1918. In 1921, the International Red Cross Conference held at Geneva expressed the wish that a special convention on the treatment of prisoners of war be adopted. The International Committee of the Red Cross drew up a draft convention which was submitted to the Diplomatic Conference convened at Geneva in 1929. The Convention does not replace but only completes the provisions of the Hague regulations. The most important innovations consisted in the prohibition of reprisals and collective penalties, the organization of prisoners' work, the designation, by the prisoners, of representatives and the control exercised by protecting Powers.

== General provisions ==
Article 1 makes explicit reference to Articles 1, 2, and 3 of Hague Convention respecting the laws and customs of war on land (Hague IV), of October 18, 1907, to define who are lawful combatants and so qualify as prisoners of war (POW) on capture. In addition to combatants covered by Hague IV, some civilians are also covered in the section of this Convention called the "Application of the Convention to certain classes of civilians".

Articles 2, 3, and 4 specifies that POWs are prisoners of the Power which holds them and not prisoners of the unit which takes their surrender; that POWs have the right to honor and respect, and that women shall be treated with all the regard due to their sex, and that prisoners of a similar category must be treated in the same way.

== Capture ==
Articles 5 and 6 covers what may and may not be done to a prisoner on capture. If requested, unless too ill to comply, prisoners are bound to give their true name and rank, but they may not be coerced into giving any more information. Prisoners' personal possessions, other than arms and horses, may not be taken from them.

The wording of the 1949 Third Geneva Convention was intentionally altered from that of the 1929 convention so that soldiers who "fall into the power" following surrender or mass capitulation of an enemy are now protected as well as those taken prisoner in the course of fighting.

== Captivity ==
=== Evacuation of prisoners of war ===
Articles 7 and 8 states that prisoners should be evacuated from the combat zone within the shortest possible period, and that belligerents are bound mutually to notify each other of their capture of prisoners within the shortest period possible.

=== Prisoner of war camps ===
Articles 9 and 10 covers the type of camp in which POWs can be detained. They must be constructed in such a way so that the conditions are similar to those used by the belligerent's own soldiers in base camps. The camps must be located in healthy locations and away from the combat zone. Also, "Belligerents shall, so far as possible, avoid assembling in a single camp prisoners of different races or nationalities." Prisoners may not be used as human shields by being sent to an area where they would be exposed to the fire of the fighting zone or be employed to render by their presence certain points or areas immune from bombardment.

Articles 11, 12, and 13 states, "Food must be of a similar quality and quantity to that of the belligerent's own soldiers, and POWs cannot be denied food as a punishment; A canteen selling local produce and products should be provided. Adequate clothing should be provided; and that sanitary service in camps should be more than sufficient to prevent epidemics."

Articles 14 and 15 covers the provision of medical facilities in each camp.

Articles 16 and 17 covers the provision of religious needs, intellectual diversions and sport facilities.

Articles 18 and 19 covers the internal discipline of a camp which is under the command of a responsible officer.

Articles 20, 21, 22, and 23 states that officers and persons of equivalent status who are prisoners of war shall be treated with the regard due their rank and age and provide more details on what that treatment should be.

Article 24 covers the rate of pay of prisoners of war.

Articles 25 and 26 covers the responsibilities of the detaining authority when transferring prisoners from one location to another. Prisoners must be healthy enough to travel, they must be informed to where they are being transferred; and their personal possessions, including bank accounts, should remain accessible.

=== Labour of prisoners of war ===
Articles 27 to 34 covers labour by prisoners of war. Work must fit the rank and health of the prisoners. The work must not be war-related and must be safe work. Remuneration will be agreed between the belligerents and will belong to the prisoner who carries out the work.

=== Prisoners' relations with the authorities ===
Articles 42 to 67 covers the prisoners' relations with the authorities. Most of these provisions are covered by the provision that prisoners are under the detaining power's own code of military regulations, with some additional provisions which cover specific prisoner of war issues and some other provisions to protect prisoners of war if the military regulations of the detaining power do not meet a minimum standard. Two specific regulations which differentiate prisoners of war from the detainees' own military regulations, is that no prisoner of war may be deprived of his rank by the detaining Power, and escaped prisoners of war who are retaken before being able to rejoin their own army or to leave the territory occupied by the army which captured them shall be liable only to disciplinary punishment.

== Termination of captivity ==
Articles 68 to 74 states that seriously sick and seriously injured prisoners of war must be repatriated as soon as their condition allows and no repatriated person may be utilized in active military service.

Article 75 covers release at the end of hostilities. The release of prisoners should form part of the armistice. If this is not possible then repatriation of prisoners shall be effected with the least possible delay after the conclusion of peace. This particular provision was to cause problems after World War II because as the surrender of the Axis powers was unconditional (unconditional surrender) there was no armistice, and in the case of Germany a full peace treaty was not signed until the signing of the Treaty on the Final Settlement with Respect to Germany in 1990.

Article 76 covers prisoners of war dying in captivity: they should be honorably buried and their graves marked and maintained properly. Wills and death certificate provisions should be the same as those for the detaining power's own soldiers.

== Bureau of relief and information concerning prisoners of war ==
Articles 77 to 80 covers how and how frequently the Powers should exchange information about prisoners and the details of how relief societies for prisoners of war should be involved in their relief.

== Application of the Convention to certain classes of civilians ==
Article 81 states that individuals who follow the armed forces without directly belonging thereto, who fall into the enemy's hands and whom the latter think expedient to detain, shall be entitled to be treated as prisoners of war. This provision covered military support contractors, civilian war correspondents, sutlers, etc.

== Execution of the convention ==
Articles 82 to 97 covers the implementation of this convention. Articles 82 and 83 contained two important clauses. "In case, in time of war, one of the belligerents is not a party to the Convention, its provisions shall nevertheless remain in force as between the belligerents who are parties thereto", and that the provisions of this convention continue to cover prisoners of war after hostilities up to their repatriation unless the belligerents agree otherwise or a more favorable regime replaces it.

== Annex to the Convention of May 27, 1929, relative to the treatment of prisoners of war ==
The annex added detail to the provisions covering repatriation and hospitalization.

== Parties ==
The following countries have either signed or ratified the Convention:

Country	Signed	Ratification / Accession (Note: The act of joining a treaty by a party that did not take part in its negotiations.) or Reservation / Declaration (Note: Any statement made by a State during accession, succession or ratification that modifies way of application of certain provisions of convention.)
Argentina		05.03.1945
Australia	27.07.1929	23.06.1931
Austria	27.07.1929	13.03.1936
Belgium	27.07.1929	12.05.1932
Bolivia	27.07.1929	13.08.1940
Brazil	27.07.1929	23.03.1932
Bulgaria	27.07.1929	13.10.1937
Canada	27.07.1929	20.02.1933
Chile	27.07.1929	01.06.1933
Republic of China	27.07.1929	19.11.1935
Colombia	27.07.1929	05.06.1941
Czechoslovakia	27.07.1929	12.10.1937
Denmark	27.07.1929	05.08.1932
Egypt	27.07.1929	25.07.1933
El Salvador		22.04.1942
Estonia	27.07.1929	11.06.1936
Fiji		09.08.1971
France	27.07.1929	21.08.1935
Germany	27.07.1929	21.02.1934
Greece	27.07.1929	28.05.1935
Hungary	27.07.1929	10.09.1936
India	27.07.1929	23.06.1931
Indonesia		05.06.1959
Iraq		29.05.1934
Israel		03.08.1948
Italy	27.07.1929	24.03.1931
Jordan		09.03.1949
Latvia	27.07.1929	14.10.1931
Liechtenstein		11.01.1944
Lithuania		27.02.1939
Mexico	27.07.1929	01.08.1932
Monaco		17.03.1948
Myanmar		01.04.1937
Netherlands	27.07.1929	05.10.1932
New Zealand	27.07.1929	23.06.1931
Norway	27.07.1929	24.06.1931
Pakistan		02.02.1948
Papua New Guinea		26.05.1976
Philippines		01.04.1947
Poland	27.07.1929	29.06.1932
Portugal	27.07.1929	08.06.1931
Romania	27.07.1929	24.10.1931
Kingdom of Serbs, Croats and Slovenes	27.07.1929	20.05.1931
Slovakia		15.09.1939
South Africa	27.07.1929	23.06.1931
Spain	27.07.1929	06.08.1930
Sweden	27.07.1929	03.07.1931
Switzerland	27.07.1929	19.12.1930
Thailand	27.07.1929	03.06.1939
Turkey	27.07.1929	10.03.1934
Britain	27.07.1929	23.06.1931
USA	27.07.1929	04.02.1932
Venezuela		15.07.1944

== Effectiveness ==
During World War II, the convention was violated by all belligerents, but to differing degrees. The Allies, with the exception of the USSR, generally abided by it. The Axis however ignored it, although German forces did give more merciful treatment to Western Allied prisoners of war, mostly to have reciprocity to captured Germans in Western Allied custody.
