= List of prisoners of Buchenwald =

Nazi concentration camp prisoners

During the history of Buchenwald concentration camp, thousands of people were imprisoned.

== List of prisoners ==
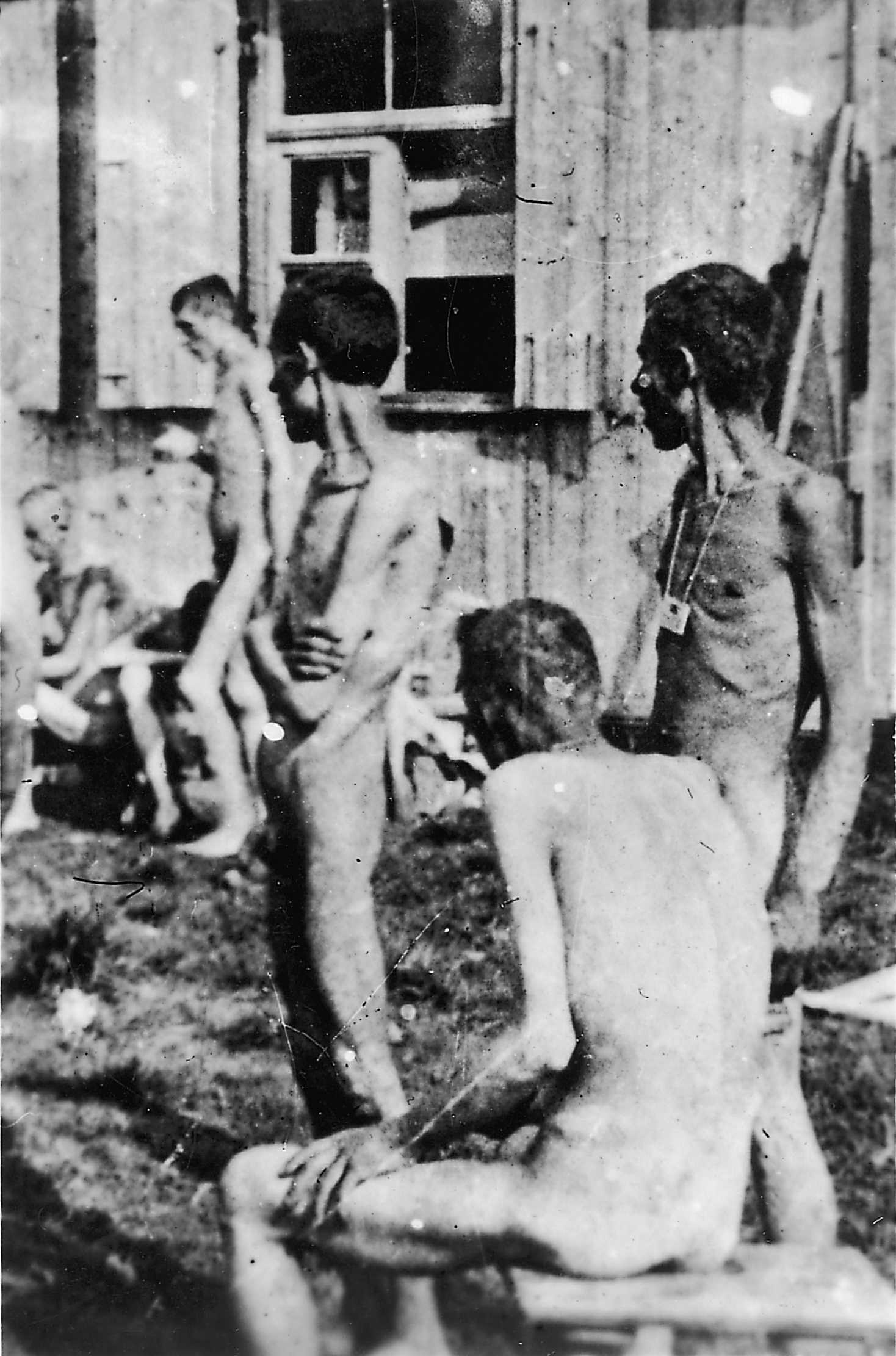
Buchenwald inmates

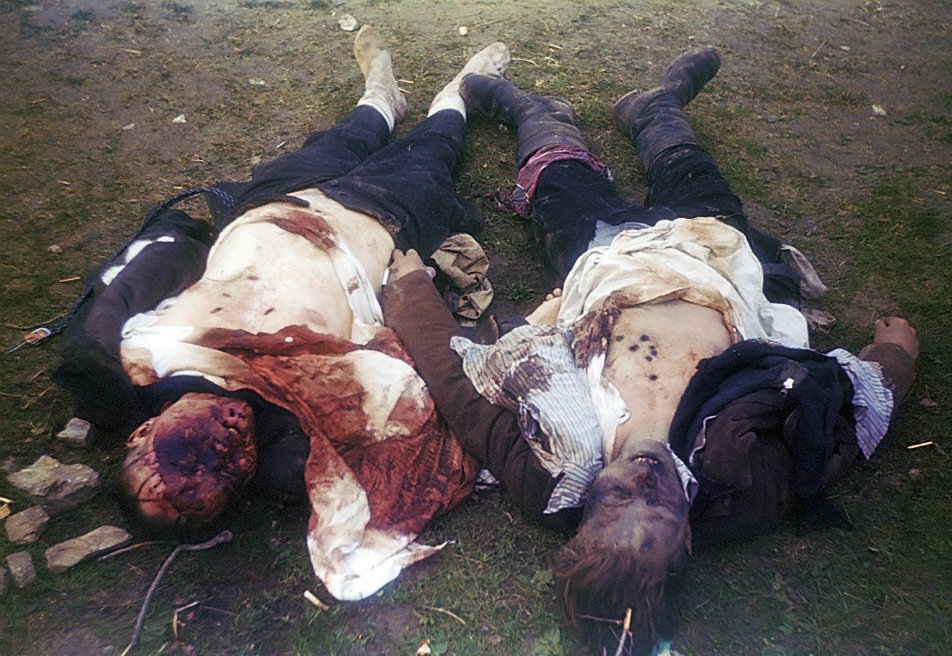
The bullet-ridden body of one SS guard, the other stabbed, who were killed in the Ohrdruf concentration camp soon after the liberation.

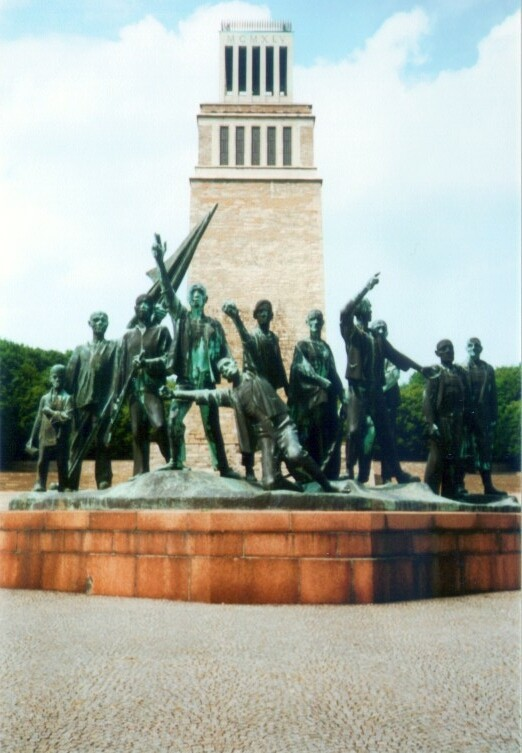
Buchenwald memorial

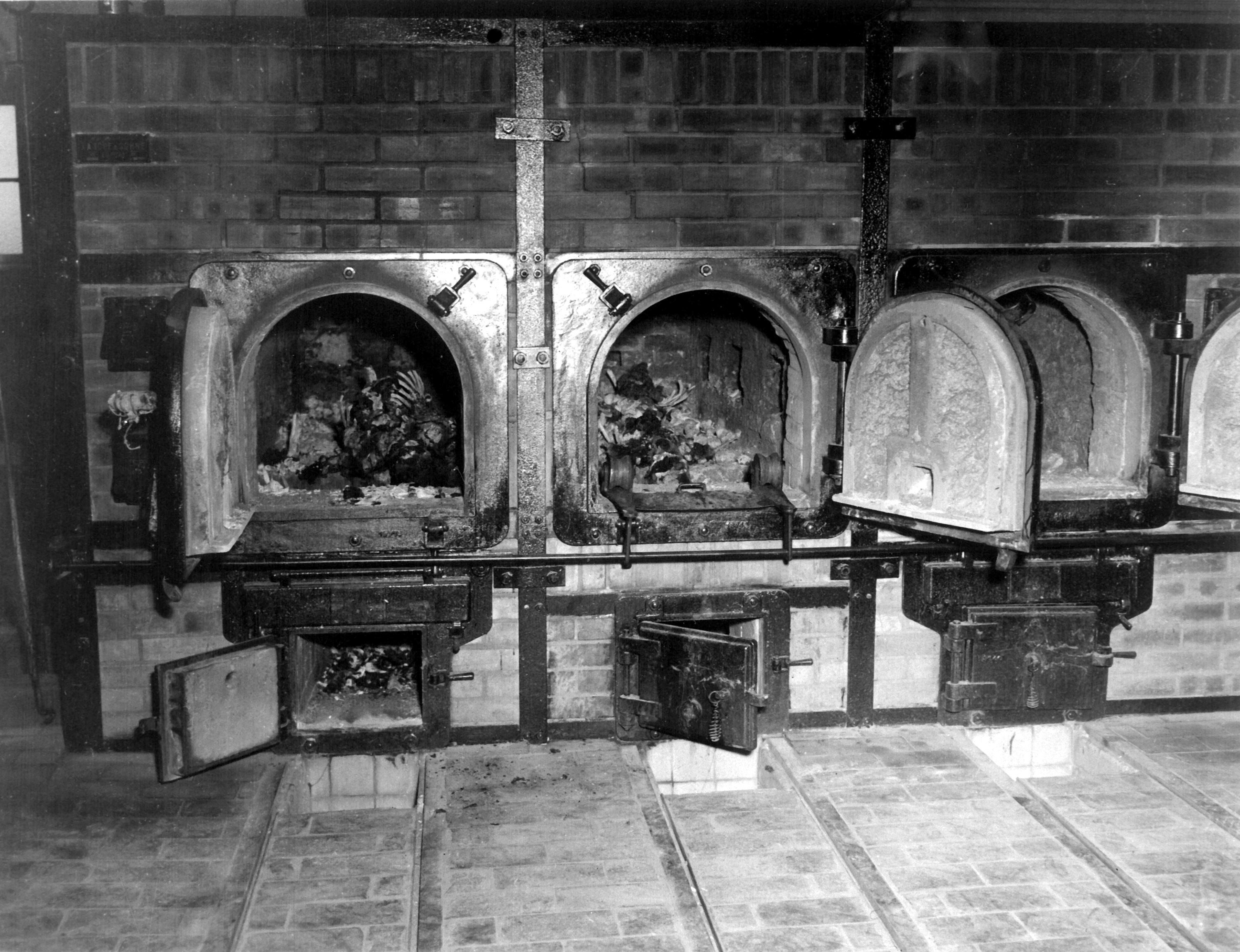
Buchenwald's crematorium

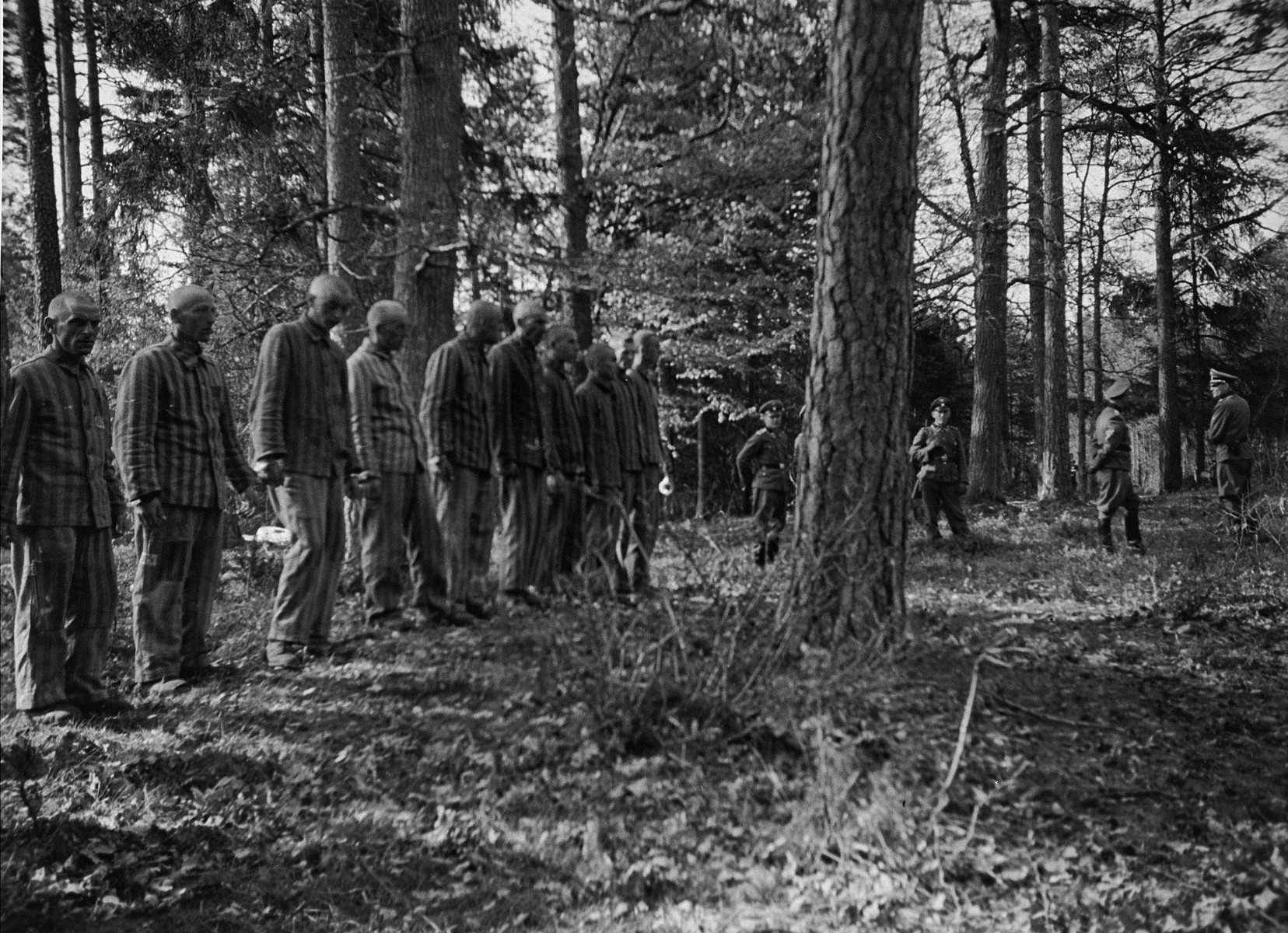
Polish prisoners from Buchenwald awaiting execution in the forest near the camp, April 26, 1942

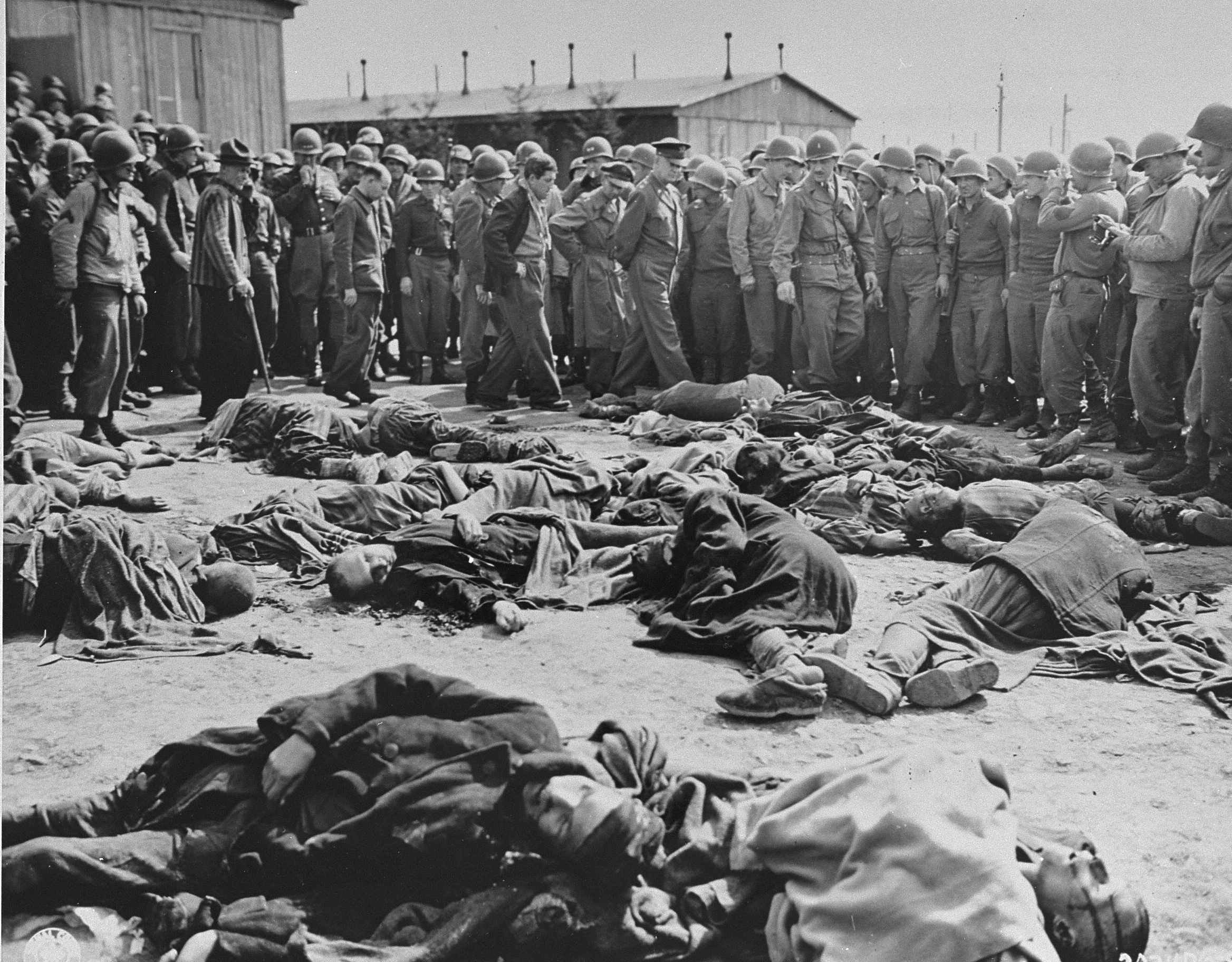
General Dwight Eisenhower and other high ranking U.S. Army officers view the bodies of prisoners, April 12, 1945

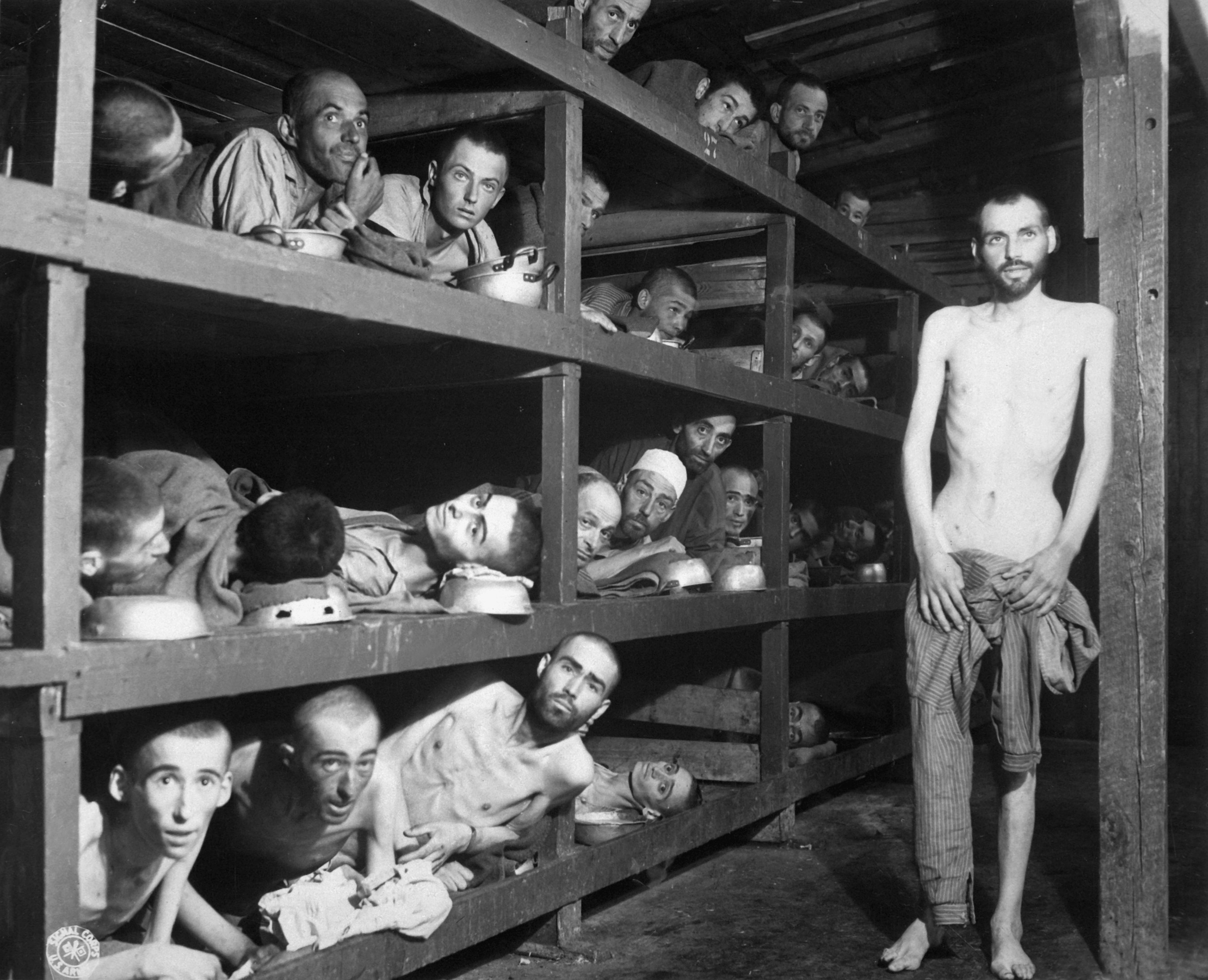
Buchenwald, photo taken April 16, 1945, five days after liberation of the camp. Elie Wiesel is in the second row from the bottom, seventh from the left, next to the bunk post.

- Roy Allen, American pilot
- Jean Améry, Austrian-Belgian writer
- Robert Antelme, French writer
- Jacob Avigdor, before World War II Chief Rabbi of Drohobych, afterward Chief Rabbi of Mexico
- Conrad Baars, psychiatrist
- Fritz Beckhardt, German-Jewish World War I fighter pilot
- Fritz Behr, German politician (SPD, SED), educator and literary scholar who would become mayor of Weimar
- Robert Benoist, French world champion motor racing driver and member of the British Special Operations Executive, executed on 9 September 1944
- Bruno Bettelheim, Jewish Austrian-American child psychologist
- Józef Biniszkiewicz, Polish socialist politician
- Jan Bissinger, German-Polish Forestry Engineer, Polish WWII Fighter
- Léon Blum, Jewish French politician, pre-and post-war long-term French prime minister
- Dietrich Bonhoeffer, Protestant theologian and prominent member of the Confessing Church
- Boris Braun, Croatian University professor
- Rudolf Brazda, the last known surviving homosexual deported to the camps; died in 2011
- Rudolf Breitscheid, former member of the SPD and leader of its faction in the Weimar Reichstag, died in the camp in 1944
- Christopher Burney, British officer and Special Operations Executive (SOE) operative
- Marian Ciepielowski, Polish physician
- Robert Clary, French actor, Corporal Louis LeBeau in the Hogan's Heroes television series
- René Cogny, French general
- Seweryn Franciszek Światopełk-Czetwertyński, Polish politician
- Édouard Daladier, French politician, former head of the French government
- Marcel Dassault, French aviation entrepreneur who founded the Dassault Group
- Hélie de Saint Marc, member of the French resistance, later involved in the attempted Algiers putsch of 1961
- Léon Delarbre, French artist and museum curator
- Laure Diebold, French resistant, Compagnon de la Libération
- Willem Drees, Dutch politician and prime minister, held as hostage in Buchenwald from 1940 to 1941
- Ernest Emanuel Israel Dreyfus, painter who emigrated to London and then to Chicago, Illinois
- Franz Ehrlich, German architect, designer of the Buchenwald entrance gates
- Marian Filar, Polish Jewish concert pianist and virtuoso.
- Ludwik Fleck, Polish serologist and philosopher of science.
- Henri Frager, French resistance member, second in command of CARTE, then head of DONKEYMAN network
- Josef Frank (politician), Czech communist
- Carl Simon Fried, physician, radiologist, poet
- Joseph Friedenson, writer and editor
- Frans Frison, Belgian resister, transported from Breendonk.
- August Froehlich, German Roman Catholic priest active in resistance movement against the National Socialism
- Otto Gerig, German Politician for Centrum Party, die in the camp
- Henry P. Glass, Austrian Architect and Industrial Designer, transferred from Dachau in September 1938, released in January 1939, moved to the US
- Albin Grau, film producer (Nosferatu, 1922)
- Maurice Halbwachs French sociologist, died in the camp in 1945
- Max Hamburger, Dutch psychiatrist
- Bertrand Herz, French engineer, president of IKBD (International Committee Buchenwald Dora and commandos)
- Curt Herzstark inventor of the Curta calculator, hand-held, hand-cranked mechanical calculator
- Heinrich Eduard Jacob, German writer
- Paul-Émile Janson, Belgian politician, former Prime Minister of Belgium, died in the camp in 1944
- Joachim Ernst, Duke of Anhalt, died in Soviet custody in 1947.
- Léon Jouhaux, French trade unionist and Nobel Peace Prize laureate
- Józef Kachel, Scout leader, head of the pre-war Polish Scouting Association in Germany
- Imre Kertész writer, 2002 Nobel Prize in Literature recipient
- Eugen Kogon, anti-Nazi activist, later Christian Socialist, professor, broadcaster and author
- Phillip (Phil) J. Lamason, Squadron Leader, Royal New Zealand Air Force
- Leon Lasota, (born 1921) Polish resistance fighter and political dissident. Successfully escaped the camp after three years of internment. Subsequently assisted the Allies as a translator.
- Yisrael Meir Lau (born 1937), Ashkenazi Chief Rabbi of Israel
- Raoul Minot (1893–1945), French amateur photographer; survived
- Hermann Leopoldi, Austrian composer and entertainer
- Fritz Löhner-Beda, Austrian lyricist
- Artur London, senior Czech communist and writer, future government minister
- Jacques Lusseyran, blind French memoirist and professor
- Princess Mafalda of Savoy, the daughter of Victor Emmanuel III of Italy, died in the camp in 1944.
- Henri Maspero, French Sinologist, pioneering scholar of Taoism, died in the camp in March 1945
- Karl Mayr, Adolf Hitler's immediate superior in an Army Intelligence Division in the Reichswehr, 1919–1920, died in the camp in 1945
- Mel Mermelstein
- Paul Morgan, Austrian actor, died in the camp in 1938
- Joseph F. Moser, American pilot
- Ferdinand Münz (1888-1969), chemist. The inventor of EDTA.
- John H. Noble, American-born gulag survivor and author; Family owner of the Praktica Camera factory, Dresden 1945
- Louis Nouveau, French, member Pat O'Leary escape line
- Andrée Peel, Member of the French resistance
- Rudolf Perth, Austrian politician and Jew 1938.
- Harry Peulevé, an agent of the SOE who managed to escape Buchenwald with F. F. E. Yeo-Thomas.
- Henri Christiaan Pieck, Dutch painter and twin brother of Anton Pieck
- Karl Plättner, Communist
- Paul Rassinier, considered the father of Holocaust denial
- Jean Riboud, French corporate executive and former chairman of Schlumberger
- Jakob Rosenfeld, minister of health under Mao
- Herbert Sandberg, artist, designer, publisher of Ulenspiegel
- Paul Schneider, German pastor, died in the camp in 1939
- Jorge Semprún, Spanish intellectual and politician and culture minister of Spain (1988–91)
- Jura Soyfer, Austrian poet and dramatist, died in the camp in 1939
- Boris Taslitzky (1911- 2005), French painter.
- Ernst Thälmann, leader of the Communist Party of Germany, died in the camp in April 1944
- Jack van der Geest, escapee
- Fred Wander, Austrian writer
- Ernst Wiechert, German writer
- Elie Wiesel, Romanian Jewish French-American writer, 1986 Nobel Peace Prize recipient
- F. F. E. Yeo-Thomas, Royal Air Force Wing Commander and British Special Operations Executive (SOE) agent, codenamed "The White Rabbit"
- Petr Zenkl, Czech National Social Party politician, deputy Prime Minister of Czechoslovakia (1946–1948)
- Icilio Zuliani, Italian footballer, died after liberation in 1945
- Horia Sima, imprisoned in a humane section of the camp alongside other Iron Guard members
- Magdeev Stanislav Vasilievich, russian kid, liberated in 1945
