= Matthias Spanlang =

Austrian Catholic priest and martyr (1887–1940)

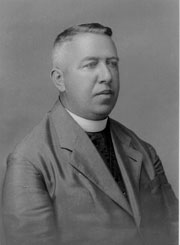
Matthias Spanlang

Matthias Spanlang (February 20, 1887 – June 5, 1940) was an Austrian priest and political prisoner.

== Early life and priesthood ==
Matthias Spanlang came from a farming family living at the Steindlgut in Stockham. Due to his talent, he passed the Abitur after attending elementary school and the Petrinum college in Linz. He then studied Roman Catholic theology. On 31 July 1910 he was ordained a priest in Linz and subsequently worked as a parish vicar in various parishes. On 31 December 1925, the parish of St. Martin im Innkreis was entrusted to him for parish work. During this time, he criticized the low pay of church workers.

== Opposition to Nazism ==
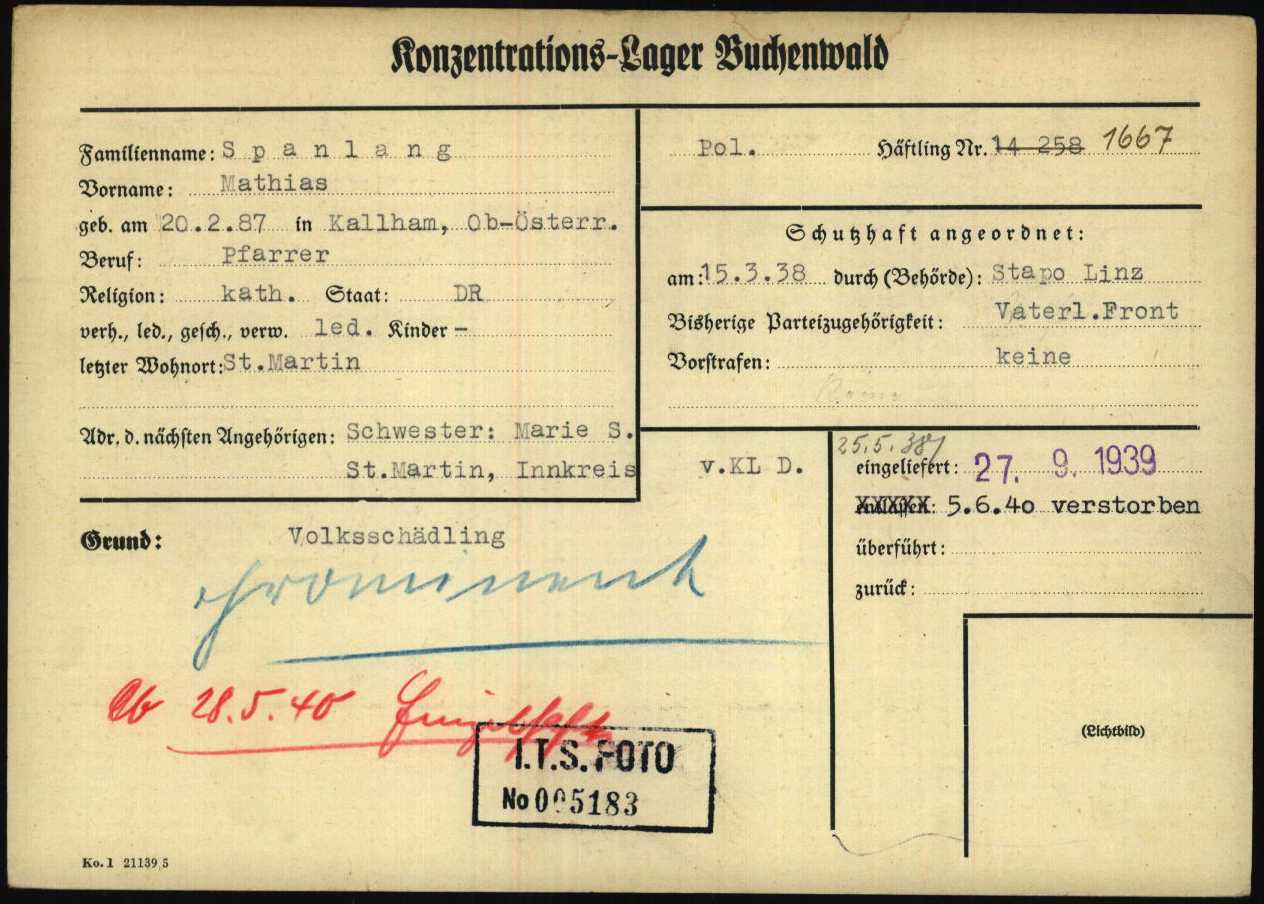
Matthias Spanlang Buchenwald archives

Spannlang was an outspoken critic of National Socialism since 1931. He wrote articles in the Rieder Volkszeitung attacking Nazi policy on Catholicism. This led to his arrest after the Anschluss. This eventually led to him being sent to Rieder prison on 24 May 1938 and from there to Dachau concentration camp. Despite some willingness to release Spanlang, the opposition of local Nazi politicians prevented his release. On 26 September 1939 he was transferred from Dachau to Buchenwald concentration camp.

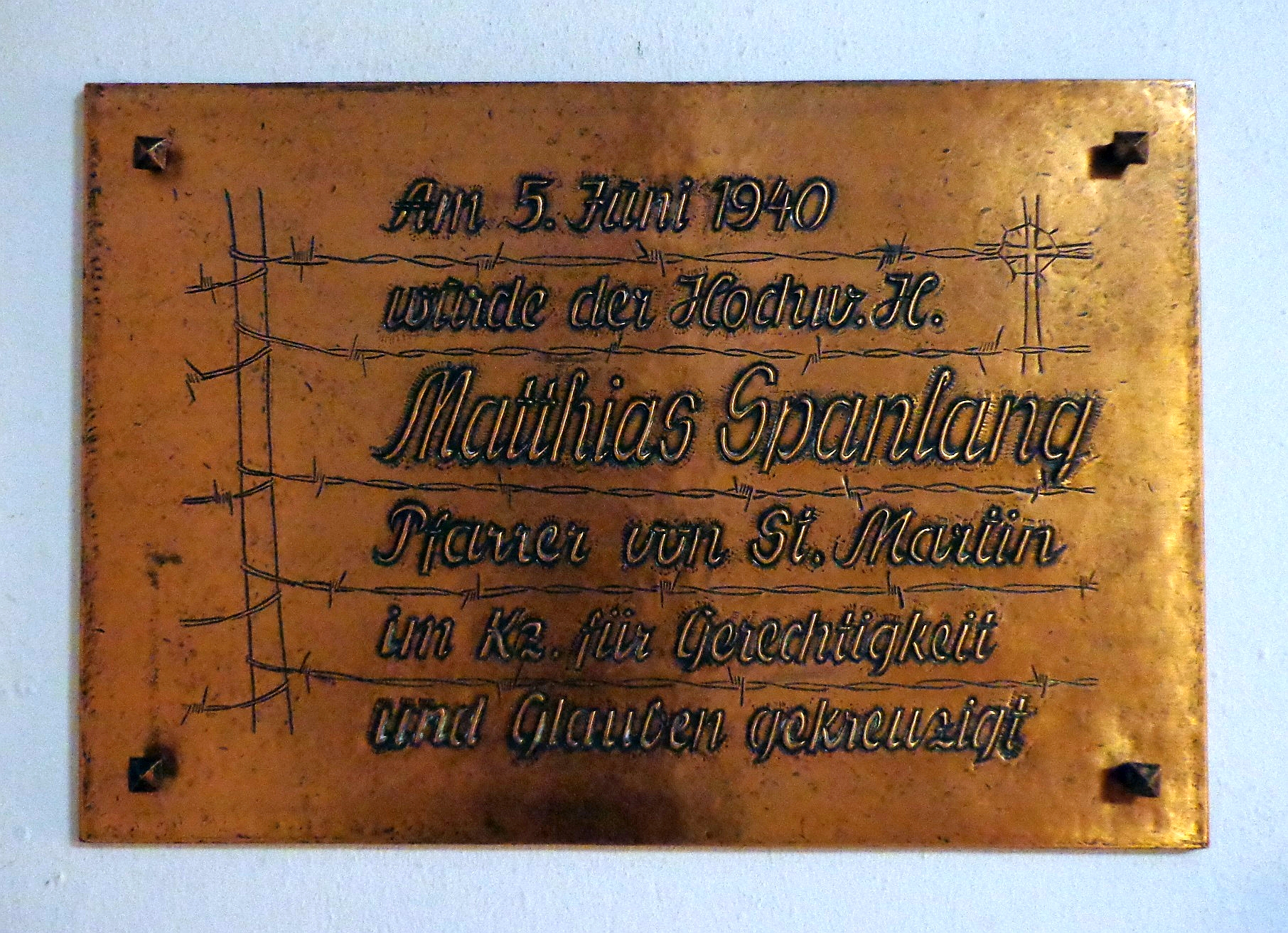
Saint Martín Parish, Linz - Matthias Spanlang

Spanlang was later taken to the detention bunker together with fellow priest Otto Neururer because both had provided religious counseling to another inmate, an event that eventually led to his death by torture by Martin Sommer. The circumstances of his death are unclear, but he may have died in a similar way to Neururer.

== Legacy ==
In 1996, Otto Neururer was beatified by Pope John Paul II, but not Father Matthias Spanlang, as there is no certainty about the circumstances of his death.
