= Terrorflieger =

Terrorflieger (German for "terror flyer" or "terror pilot") was a term used in Nazi Germany during the Second World War to describe Allied military aviators, particularly members of the British Royal Air Force (RAF) and the United States Army Air Forces (USAAF), who were accused of conducting aerial attacks against the German civilian population. The designation was used in German wartime propaganda, military correspondence and discussions concerning the treatment of captured Allied airmen.

The term became increasingly prominent during the Combined Bomber Offensive, when British and American aerial operations caused extensive destruction in German cities. It was applied to bomber crews involved in attacks on urban areas and to fighter pilots accused of strafing civilians and other non-military targets. Related terms used in connection included Luftgangster ("air gangster") and Kindermörder ("child murderer").

In 1944, German authorities developed criteria for identifying alleged Terrorflieger and considered denying such personnel the protections normally accorded to prisoners of war. Captured Allied airmen accused under this designation were subjected to imprisonment, physical assault and execution. The term was also used by German civilians participating in attacks on captured aircrews.

== History ==
=== Origins and wartime usage ===
The term Terrorflieger developed within German public discourse surrounding the Allied bombing campaign against the German Reich. Its use expanded as aerial attacks increased in frequency and destructiveness during 1943 and 1944.

German propaganda applied the designation to Allied aircrews accused of attacking residential districts, civilians and other non-military targets. The term appeared in newspapers, official statements and propaganda publications, including the Nazi Party newspaper Völkischer Beobachter.

On 27 May 1944, Joseph Goebbels, the German Minister of Propaganda, published an article entitled "Ein Wort zum feindlichen Luftterror" ("A Word on Enemy Air Terror"). The article accused Allied air forces of deliberately attacking the German civilian population and defended violent reactions against captured airmen. The article was subsequently introduced as evidence during the Nuremberg trials.

In May 1944, Adolf Hitler discussed the treatment of captured American aviators with Japanese ambassador Hiroshi Ōshima. According to the German record of their meeting on 27 May, Hitler recommended hanging American pilots designated as Terrorflieger in retaliation for aerial attacks.

=== German military classification ===
During June 1944, German military and government authorities discussed the formal definition of a Terrorflieger and the measures to be taken against captured airmen placed in this category.

The German High Command established four categories of conduct for identifying alleged terror flyers:

1. Attacks directed against civilians.
2. Firing upon German aircrew members descending by parachute.
3. Attacks against passenger trains in civilian service.
4. Attacks against clearly marked civilian or military hospitals and hospital trains.

The criteria were communicated among the Oberkommando der Wehrmacht, the Luftwaffe leadership, the Foreign Ministry and German security authorities.

On 5 July 1944, a German military directive addressed the possible treatment of Allied pilots captured after attacks on small settlements without military or economic significance. The directive contemplated treating such airmen as murderers rather than prisoners of war, but specified that no immediate action was to be taken pending further consultations.

The application of the term was not confined to individuals whose conduct had been investigated under these criteria. German civilians also used it more broadly for Allied bomber crews and captured airmen.

== Allied bombing of German civilians ==
The use of the term Terrorflieger was closely associated with the strategic bombing campaign against Germany and the large-scale destruction of civilian residential areas.

In February 1942, the British Air Ministry issued the Area bombing directive, which identified the morale of the German civilian population, particularly industrial workers, as a principal objective of the bombing offensive.

Under the direction of RAF Bomber Command, British aircraft conducted large-scale attacks against German urban centres. High-explosive and incendiary bombs were used to destroy densely built residential districts and industrial areas.

Among the major attacks were:

- Hamburg, July–August 1943: During Operation Gomorrah, British night raids concentrated on densely populated residential areas, while American daytime operations attacked harbour facilities and industrial targets. A firestorm developed during the British attack of 27–28 July. Approximately 35,000 to 40,000 people died during the bombing campaign.
- Darmstadt, 11–12 September 1944: RAF Bomber Command attacked Darmstadt during the operation known locally as the Brandnacht. The attack devastated much of the city centre and produced a firestorm. Estimates place the number of deaths at approximately 12,500 to 13,000. Many victims died from burns or asphyxiation while sheltering in basements.
- Pforzheim, 23 February 1945: British bombers dropped more than 1,500 tonnes of bombs on Pforzheim in an attack lasting approximately 20 minutes. The resulting firestorm destroyed the city centre. More than 17,600 people were estimated to have died.

The United States Army Air Forces conducted daylight bombing operations against Germany from 1943 onward, generally concentrating on industrial facilities, transportation infrastructure and other designated military or economic targets. American bombing nevertheless caused extensive destruction in residential areas and substantial civilian casualties.

One of the most destructive American attacks against a German city occurred on 3 February 1945 on Berlin when approximately 937 bombers of the American Eighth Air Force dropped 2,264 tonnes of bombs on Berlin. Large sections of central Berlin, including residential neighbourhoods in Kreuzberg, were destroyed. At least 2,800 people were killed, more than 12,000 were injured, and approximately 120,000 were left homeless.

The bombing of Dresden in February 1945 was conducted by both British and American air forces. During the night of 13–14 February, RAF Bomber Command carried out two major attacks using high-explosive and incendiary bombs. These raids caused widespread fires and destroyed much of the historic city centre.

American bombers attacked Dresden on 14 and 15 February. The attacks destroyed approximately 80,000 dwellings and killed up to 25,000 people, according to the German Historical Museum.

Dresden was also a transit centre for refugees fleeing westward from the advancing Soviet forces. The attacks affected residential districts and civilian refugees as well as transportation and industrial infrastructure.

== Treatment of captured airmen ==
=== Violence against Allied prisoners ===
By 1944, captured Allied pilots and other aircrew members were increasingly subjected to violence in Germany. German civilians, Nazi Party officials, police personnel and members of security organisations participated in attacks against airmen who had been shot down or had parachuted from damaged aircraft.

German propaganda encouraged hostility towards Allied airmen, while official instructions increasingly discouraged intervention to protect prisoners from civilian reprisals.

=== Rüsselsheim massacre ===
On 26 August 1944, eight captured American airmen were marched through Rüsselsheim am Main after damage from a British bombing raid had disrupted railway services.

The Americans belonged to the crew of a Consolidated B-24 Liberator commanded by Second Lieutenant Norman J. Rogers Jr. Their aircraft had been shot down on 24 August, before the bombing of Rüsselsheim.

Residents of the city identified the prisoners as Terrorflieger, believing that they belonged to the aircrews responsible for the destruction of the previous night. A crowd attacked the prisoners with stones, clubs, hammers and other objects.

Six of the Americans were killed. Two, William M. Adams and Sidney E. Brown, survived by pretending to be dead and subsequently escaping from the scene. The German soldiers escorting the prisoners did not intervene to prevent the attacks.

The killings were investigated after the occupation of the city by American forces in March 1945. The perpetrators were prosecuted in one of the early postwar trials concerning the murder of Allied prisoners.

=== Imprisonment at Buchenwald ===
In August 1944, 168 captured Allied airmen were transferred to Buchenwald concentration camp after German security authorities treated them as criminals and alleged terrorists rather than as prisoners of war.

The group included American, British, Canadian, Australian and New Zealand personnel. Many had been captured while attempting to evade German forces in occupied Europe.

The prisoners arrived at Buchenwald on 20 August 1944. They were subjected to conditions of imprisonment that included starvation, physical abuse and inadequate shelter.

On 19 October, 156 of the prisoners were transferred to Stalag Luft III. Twelve remained at Buchenwald because of illness, and two died during their imprisonment there.

== Postwar investigations ==
Following the German surrender in May 1945, Allied occupation authorities investigated killings and other violence against captured airmen.

American military courts conducted a series of proceedings commonly referred to as the "flyer trials". These examined the involvement of civilians, police officers, Nazi Party officials and military personnel in assaults and executions of captured Allied aviators.

== See also ==
- Strategic bombing during World War II
- Combined Bomber Offensive
- Area bombing directive
- Bombing of Dresden in World War II
- Rüsselsheim massacre
- Allied airmen at Buchenwald concentration camp
- War crimes in World War II
