= Icilio Zuliani =

Italian footballer

Personal information
- Date of birth: 29 October 1909
- Place of birth: Fiume, Italy
- Date of death: 9 May 1945 (aged 35)
- Place of death: Buchenwald concentration camp, Nazi Germany
- Position: Forward

Senior career*
Years	Team	Apps	(Gls)
1928–1937	Fiumana	>7	(>3)
- * Club domestic league appearances and goals

Icilio Zuliani (29 October 1909 – 9 May 1945) was an Italian professional footballer who played as a forward in Serie B and Serie C for Fiumana.

A noted anti-fascist, Zuliani collaborated with partisans during the Second World War. He was arrested in April 1944 and jailed in Trieste before being moved to the Dachau concentration camp. In December, he was moved to Buchenwald concentration camp, where he was imprisoned until liberation in April 1945. However, weakened by dysentery, Zuliani died on 9 May 1945, the day after the German surrender.
