= Buchenwald concentration camp =

Nazi concentration camp in Germany

Coordinates: 51°01′20″N 11°14′53″E

Buchenwald
- Nazi concentration camp
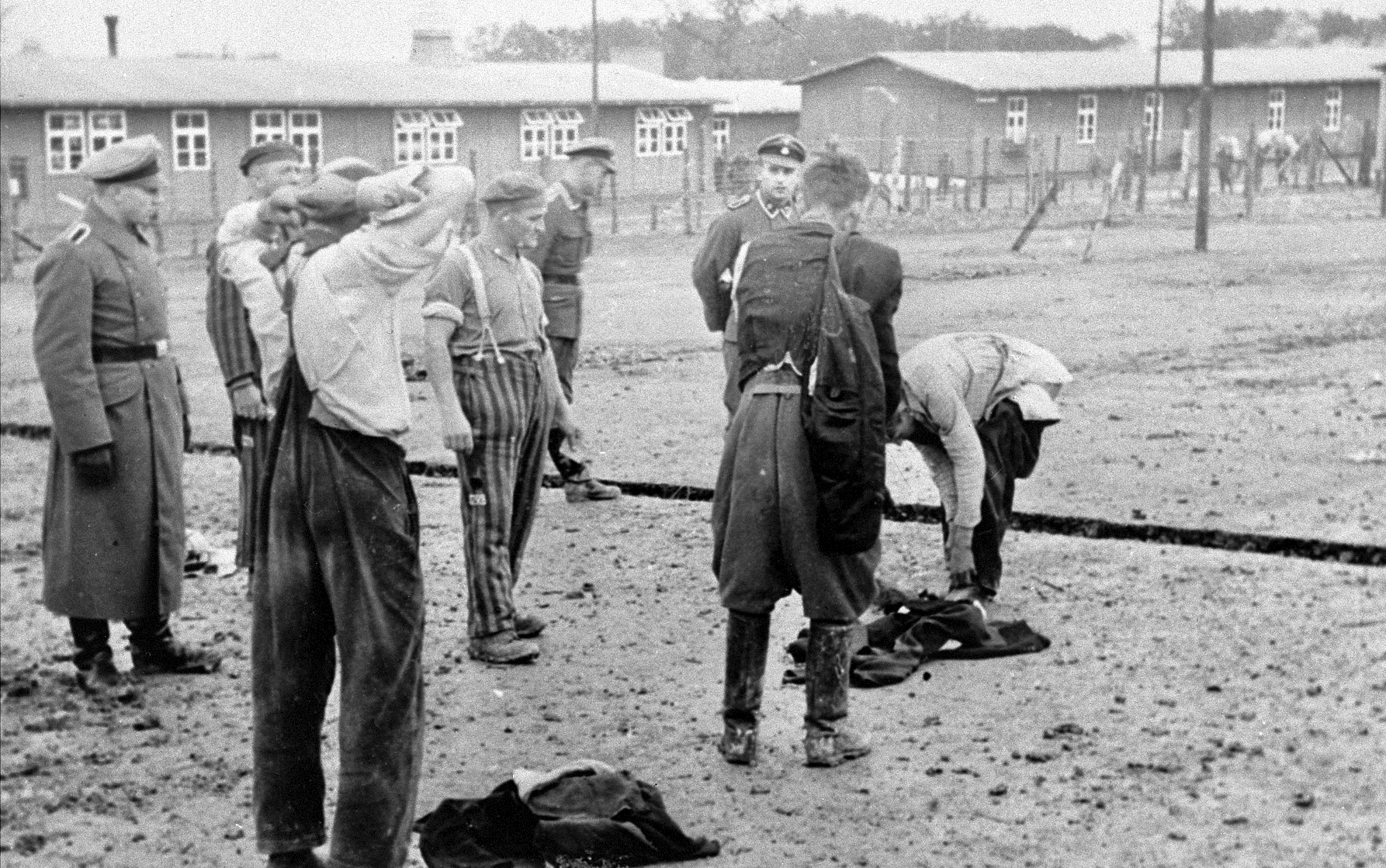
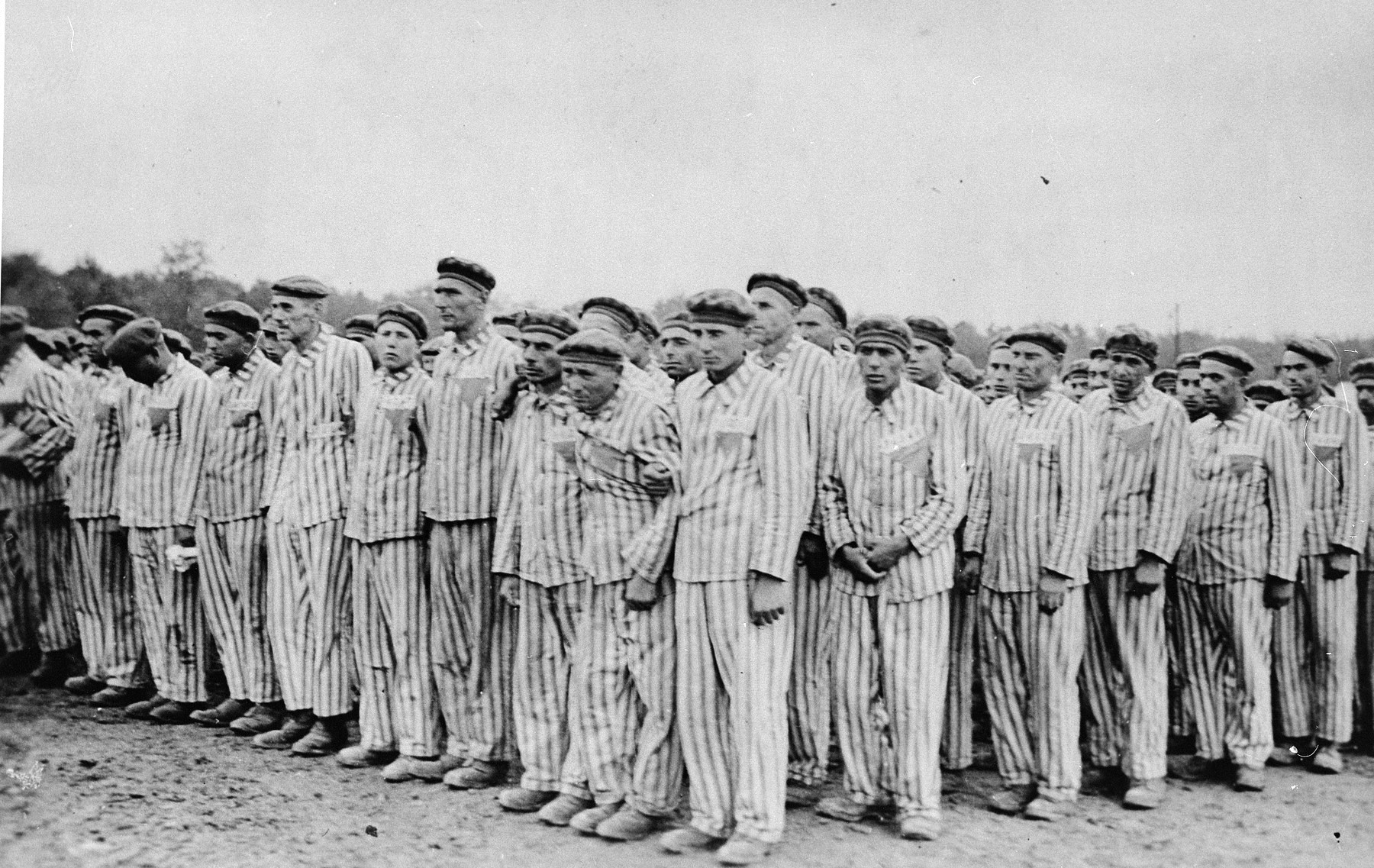
- Polish prisoners forced to undress after arriving in the camp, c. 1940; Below: Roll call at Buchenwald

- Location of Buchenwald within Nazi Germany in 1937
- Location: Weimar, Germany
- Operated by: Schutzstaffel
- Commandant: Karl-Otto Koch (1 August 1937 – July 1941); Hermann Pister (1942–1945)
- Operational: 15 July 1937 – 11 April 1945
- Number of inmates: 280,000
- Killed: 56,545
- Liberated by: 6th Armored Division, United States Army
- Notable inmates: Bruno Apitz, Phil Lamason, Elie Wiesel, Rudolf Brazda, Imre Kertész, Ernst Thälmann
- Website: www.buchenwald.de/en/69/

Buchenwald (German pronunciation: [ˈbuːxn̩valt]; 'beech forest') was a German Nazi concentration camp established on Ettersberg hill near Weimar, Germany, in July 1937. It was one of the first and the largest of the concentration camps within the Altreich (Old Reich) territories. Many actual or suspected communists were among the first internees.

The Nazi camp prisoners came from all over Europe and the Soviet Union, and included Jews, Poles and other Slavs, Roma, the mentally ill and physically disabled, political prisoners, Freemasons, and prisoners of war. There were also ordinary criminals and sexual deviants. All prisoners were primarily subjected to forced labor in local armaments factories. The insufficient food and poor conditions, as well as deliberate executions, led to 56,545 deaths at Buchenwald out of the 280,000 prisoners who passed through the camp and its 139 subcamps.

The camp gained notoriety when it was liberated by the United States Army in April 1945; Allied commander Dwight D. Eisenhower visited one of its subcamps.

From August 1945 to March 1950, the camp was used by the Soviet occupation authorities as an internment camp, NKVD special camp Nr. 2, where 28,455 prisoners were held, out of whom 7,127 died. The camp was then razed to hide this last episode.

Today the remains of Buchenwald serve as a memorial and permanent exhibition and museum.

== Establishment ==
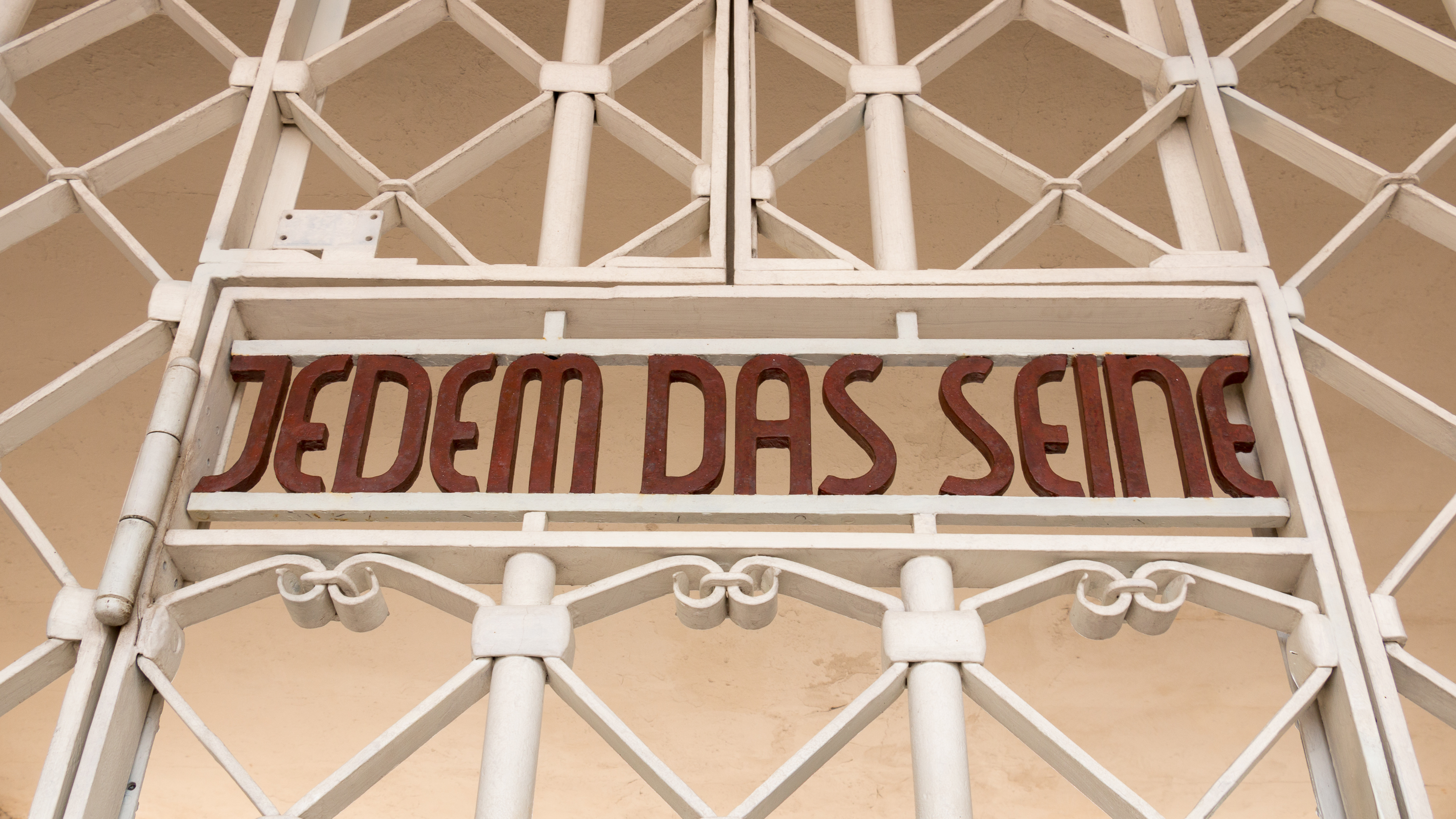
The inscription on the entrance gate to Buchenwald concentration camp, which reads: "Jedem das Seine" ("To each what he deserves")

The Schutzstaffel (SS) established Buchenwald concentration camp at the beginning of July 1937. The camp was to be named Ettersberg, after the hill in Thuringia upon whose north slope the camp was established. The proposed name was deemed inappropriate because it carried associations with several important figures in German culture, especially Enlightenment writer Johann Wolfgang von Goethe who had lived in Weimar. Instead the camp was to be named Buchenwald, in reference to the beech forest in the area. However, Holocaust researcher James E. Young wrote that SS leaders chose the site of the camp precisely to erase the cultural legacy of the area. After the area of the camp was cleared of trees, only one large oak remained, supposedly one of Goethe's Oaks.

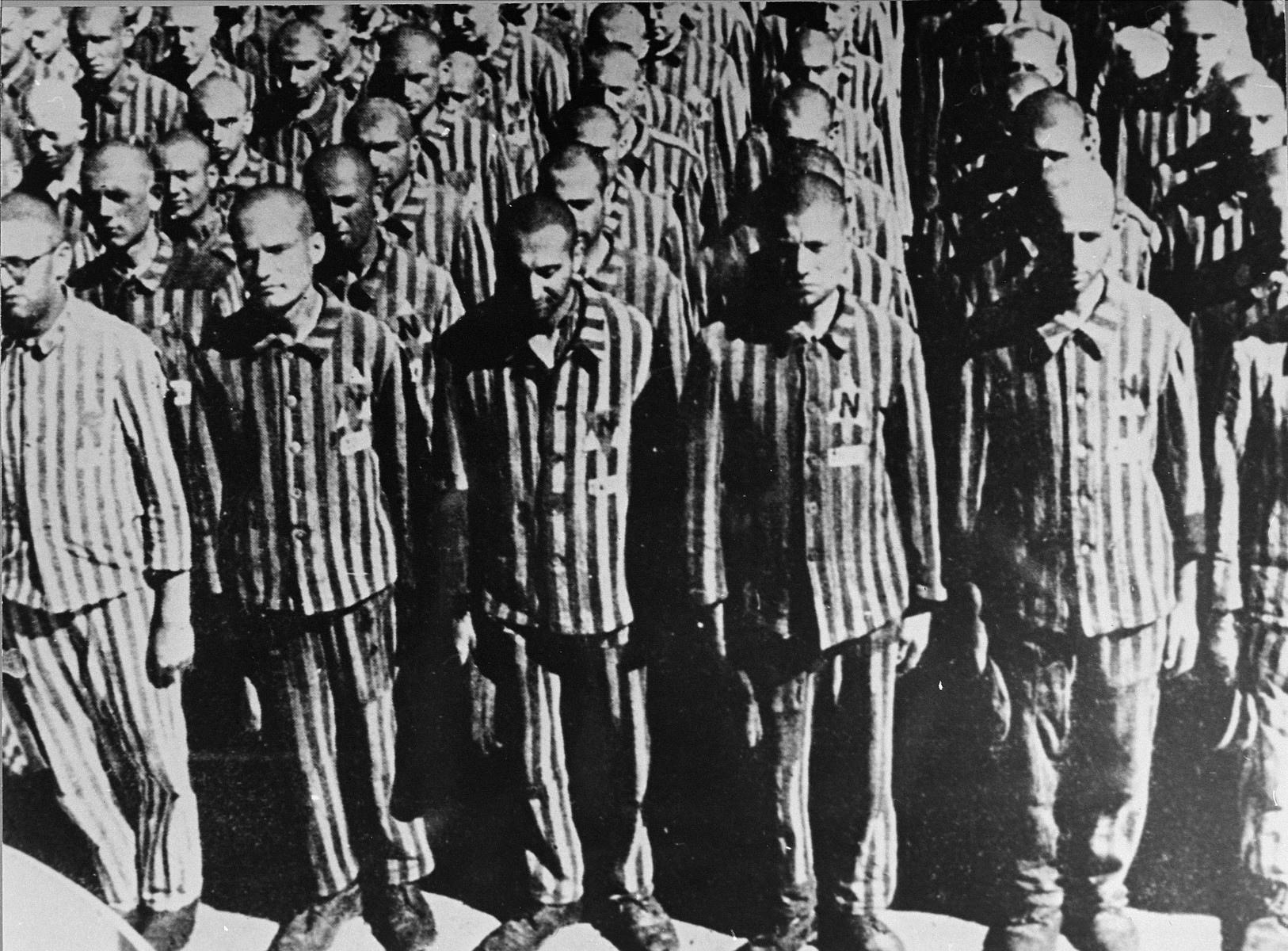
Dutch Jews stand during a roll call after their prisoner transport from Buchenwald in May 1941 in camp Mauthausen on 26 June 1941.

The camp, designed to hold 8,000 prisoners, was intended to replace several smaller concentration camps nearby, including Bad Sulza, Sachsenburg, and Lichtenburg. Compared to these camps, Buchenwald had a greater potential to profit the SS because the nearby clay deposits could be made into bricks by the forced labor of prisoners. The first prisoners arrived on 15 July 1937, and had to clear the area of trees and build the camp's structures. By September, the population had risen to 2,400 following transfers from Bad Sulza, Sachsenburg, and Lichtenburg.

On the camp's main gate, the motto Jedem das Seine (English: "To each what he deserves"), was inscribed. The SS interpreted this to mean the "master race" had a right to humiliate and destroy others. It was designed by Buchenwald prisoner and Bauhaus architect Franz Ehrlich, who used a Bauhaus typeface for it, even though Bauhaus was seen as degenerate art by the National Socialists and was prohibited. This defiance however went unnoticed by the SS.

== Command structure ==
=== Organization ===
Buchenwald's first commandant was SS-Obersturmbannführer Karl-Otto Koch, who ran the camp from 1 August 1937 to July 1941. His second wife, Ilse Koch, became notorious as Die Hexe von Buchenwald ("the witch of Buchenwald") for her cruelty and brutality. In February 1940 Koch had an indoor riding hall built by the prisoners who died by the dozen due to the harsh conditions of the construction site. The hall was built inside the camp, near the canteen, so that Ilse Koch could often be seen riding in the morning to the beat of the prisoner orchestra. Koch himself was eventually imprisoned at Buchenwald by the Nazi authorities for incitement to murder. The charges were lodged by Josias, Prince of Waldeck and Pyrmont and Konrad Morgen; to which charges were later added those of corruption, embezzlement, black market dealings, and exploitation of the camp workers for personal gain. Other camp officials were charged, including Ilse Koch. The trial resulted in Karl Koch being sentenced to death for disgracing both himself and the SS; he was executed by firing squad on 5 April 1945, one week before American troops arrived. Ilse Koch was acquitted by the SS court and released. However, she was rearrested by American occupation authorities in June 1945, and chosen as one of 31 Buchenwald defendants to stand trial before a Military Commission Court at Dachau. The life sentence imposed by the Dachau court was reduced to four years upon review. Upon her release from U.S. custody in October 1949, she was arrested by West German authorities, tried at Augsburg, and again sentenced to life imprisonment; she committed suicide in Aichach (Bavaria) prison in September 1967. The second commandant of the camp, between 1942 and 1945, was Hermann Pister (1942–1945). He was tried in 1947 (Dachau Trials) and sentenced to death, but on 28 September 1948 he died in Landsberg Prison of a heart attack.

=== Female prisoners and overseers ===
The number of women held in Buchenwald was somewhere between 500 and 1,000. The first female inmates were twenty political prisoners who were accompanied by a female SS guard (Aufseherin); these women were brought to Buchenwald from Ravensbrück in 1941 and forced into sexual slavery at the camp's brothel. The SS later fired the SS woman on duty in the brothel for corruption; her position was taken over by "brothel mothers" as ordered by SS chief Heinrich Himmler.

The majority of women prisoners, however, arrived in 1944 and 1945 from other camps, mainly Auschwitz, Ravensbrück, and Bergen Belsen. Only one barracks was set aside for them; this was overseen by the female block leader (Blockführerin) Franziska Hoengesberg, who came from Essen when it was evacuated. All the women prisoners were later shipped out to one of Buchenwald's many female satellite camps such as at Sömmerda, Buttelstedt, Mühlhausen, Gotha, Gelsenkirchen, Essen, Lippstadt, Weimar, Magdeburg, and Penig. No female guards were permanently stationed at Buchenwald.

Despite popular opinion, Koch never served in any official capacity at the camp, nor ever acted as guard. In total, however, more than 530 women served as guards in the vast Buchenwald system of subcamps and external commands across Germany. Only 22 women served/trained in Buchenwald, compared to over 15,500 men.

=== Subcamps ===
About 136 subcamps and satellite commandos belonged to Buchenwald concentration camp.

In 1942, the SS began to use its forced labor supply for armaments production. Because it was more economical to rent out prisoners to private firms, subcamps were set up near factories which had a demand for prisoner labor. Private firms paid the SS between 4 and 6 Reichsmarks per day per prisoner, resulting in an estimated 95,758,843 Reichsmarks in revenue for the SS between June 1943 and February 1945. These subcamps were mainly used for armament production and other fabrications and are considered labour camps. Conditions were worse than at the main camp, with prisoners provided insufficient food and inadequate shelter.

== Allied POWs ==
Although it was relatively rare for German authorities to send Western Allied POWs to concentration camps, Buchenwald held a group of 168 aviators for two months. These men were from the United States, United Kingdom, Canada, Australia, New Zealand and Jamaica. They all arrived at Buchenwald on 20 August 1944.

All were in aircraft that had crashed in occupied France. Two explanations are given for them being sent to a concentration camp: first, that they had managed to make contact with the French Resistance, some were disguised as civilians, and they were carrying false papers when caught; they were therefore categorized by the Germans as spies, which meant their rights under the Geneva Convention were not respected. The second explanation is that they had been categorised as Terrorflieger ("terror aviators"). The aviators were initially held in Gestapo prisons and headquarters in France. In April or August 1944, they and other Gestapo prisoners were packed into covered goods wagons and sent to Buchenwald. The journey took five days, during which they received very little food or water.

== Victims ==
=== Causes of death ===
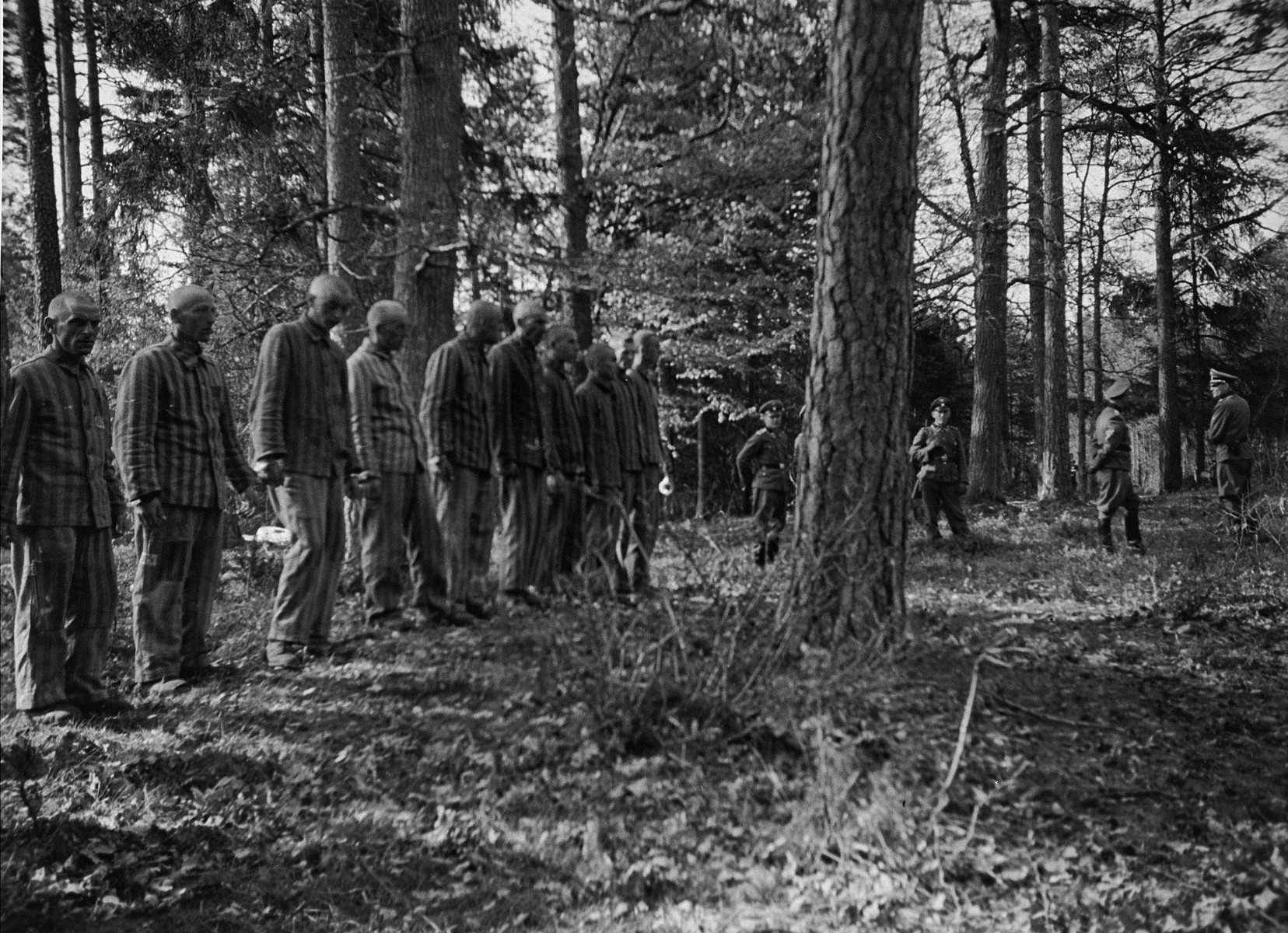
On 26 April 1942, twenty Polish prisoners were hanged in retaliation for the killing of a German overseer. Pictured awaiting execution.

A primary cause of death was illness due to harsh camp conditions. Like other Nazi concentration camps, prisoners at Buchenwald were deliberately kept in a state of starvation, many while performing grueling forced labor, making consequent illnesses prevalent. Malnourished and suffering from disease, many were literally "worked to death" under the Vernichtung durch Arbeit policy (extermination through labor), as inmates only had the choice between slave labor or inevitable execution. Many inmates were killed by human experimentation or fell victim to arbitrary acts perpetrated by the SS guards. Other prisoners were simply murdered, primarily by shooting and hanging. As part of Action 14f13, prisoners deemed too weak or sick to work were sent to Sonnenstein Killing Facility, where they were murdered with carbon monoxide gas.

Walter Gerhard Martin Sommer was an SS-Hauptscharführer who served as a guard at the concentration camps of Dachau and Buchenwald. Known as the "Hangman of Buchenwald", he was considered a depraved sadist who reportedly ordered Otto Neururer and Mathias Spanlang, two Austrian priests, to be crucified upside-down. Sommer was especially infamous for hanging prisoners from trees by their wrists, which had been tied behind their backs (a torture technique known as strappado) in the "singing forest", so named because of the screams which emanated from this wooded area.

Summary executions of Soviet POWs were also carried out at Buchenwald. At least 1,000 men were selected in 1941–42 by a task force of three Dresden Gestapo officers and sent to the camp for immediate liquidation by a gunshot to the back of the neck, the infamous Genickschuss.

The camp was also a site of large-scale trials for vaccines against epidemic typhus in 1942 and 1943. In all 729 inmates were used as test subjects, of whom 154 died. Other "experimentation" occurred at Buchenwald on a smaller scale. One such experiment aimed at determining the precise fatal dose of a poison of the alkaloid group; according to the testimony of one doctor, four Soviet POWs were administered the poison, and when it proved not to be fatal they were "strangled in the crematorium" and subsequently "dissected". Among various other experiments was one which, in order to test the effectiveness of a balm for wounds from incendiary bombs, involved inflicting "very severe" white phosphorus burns on inmates. When challenged at trial over the nature of this testing, and particularly over the fact that the testing was designed in some cases to cause death and only to measure the time which elapsed until death was caused, one Nazi doctor's defence was that, although a doctor, he was a "legally appointed executioner".

=== Number of deaths ===
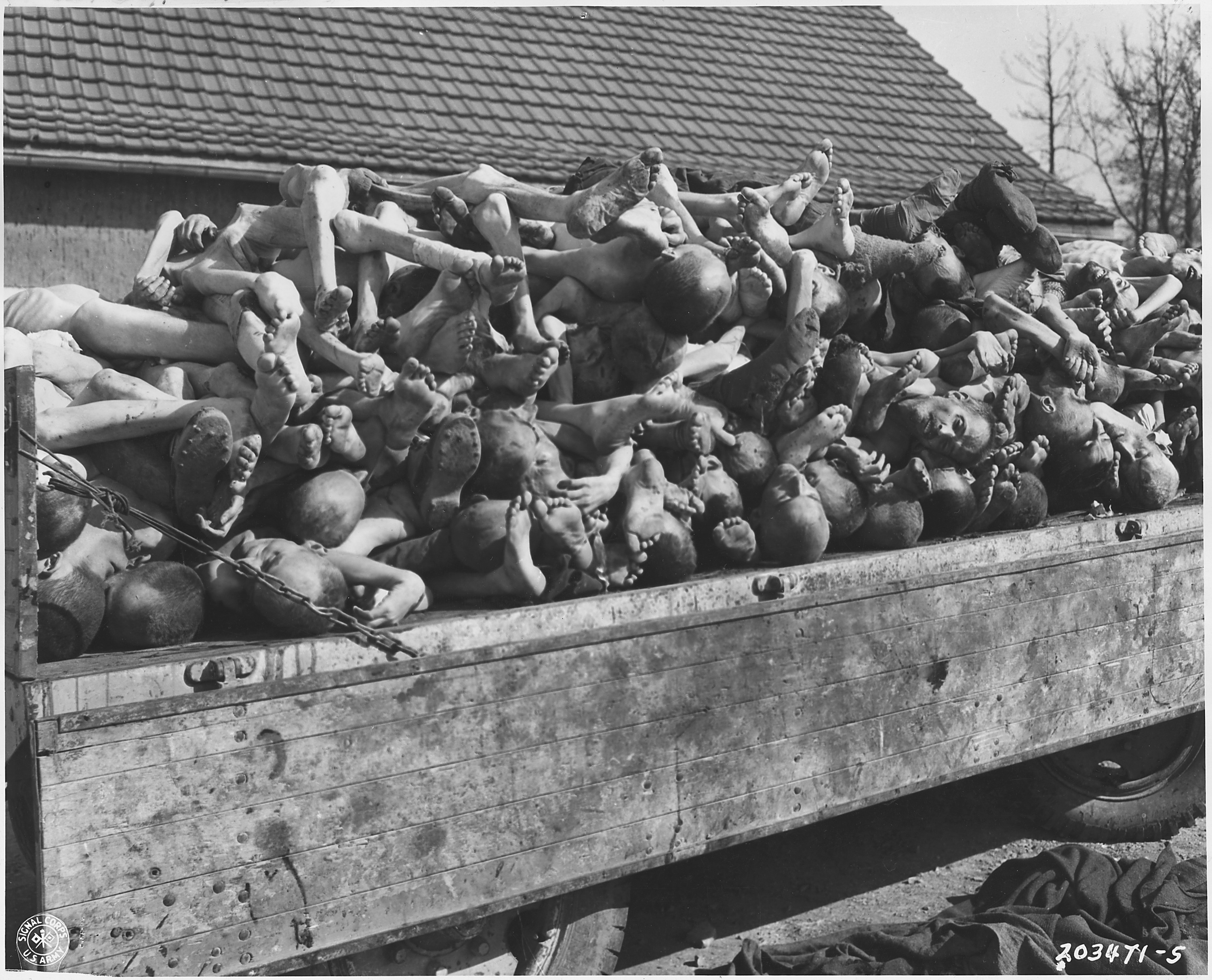
Corpses found in the camp after liberation

The SS left behind accounts of the number of prisoners and people coming to and leaving the camp, categorizing those leaving them by release, transfer, or death. These accounts are one of the sources of estimates for the number of deaths in Buchenwald. According to SS documents, 33,462 died. These documents were not, however, necessarily accurate: Among those executed before 1944, many were listed as "transferred to the Gestapo". Furthermore, from 1941, Soviet POWs were executed in mass killings. Arriving prisoners selected for execution were not entered into the camp register and therefore were not among the 33,462 dead listed.

One former Buchenwald prisoner, Armin Walter, calculated the number of executions by the number of shootings in the spine at the base of the head. His job at Buchenwald was to set up and care for a radio installation at the facility where people were executed; he counted the numbers, which arrived by telex, and hid the information. He says that 8,483 Soviet prisoners of war were shot in this manner.

According to the same source, the total number of deaths at Buchenwald is estimated at 56,545. This number is the sum of:

- Deaths according to material left behind by the SS: 33,462
- Executions by shooting: 8,483
- Executions by hanging (estimate): 1,100
- Deaths during evacuation transports (estimate): 13,500

This total (56,545) corresponds to a death rate of 24 percent, assuming that the number of persons passing through the camp according to documents left by the SS, 240,000 prisoners, is accurate.

== Liberation ==
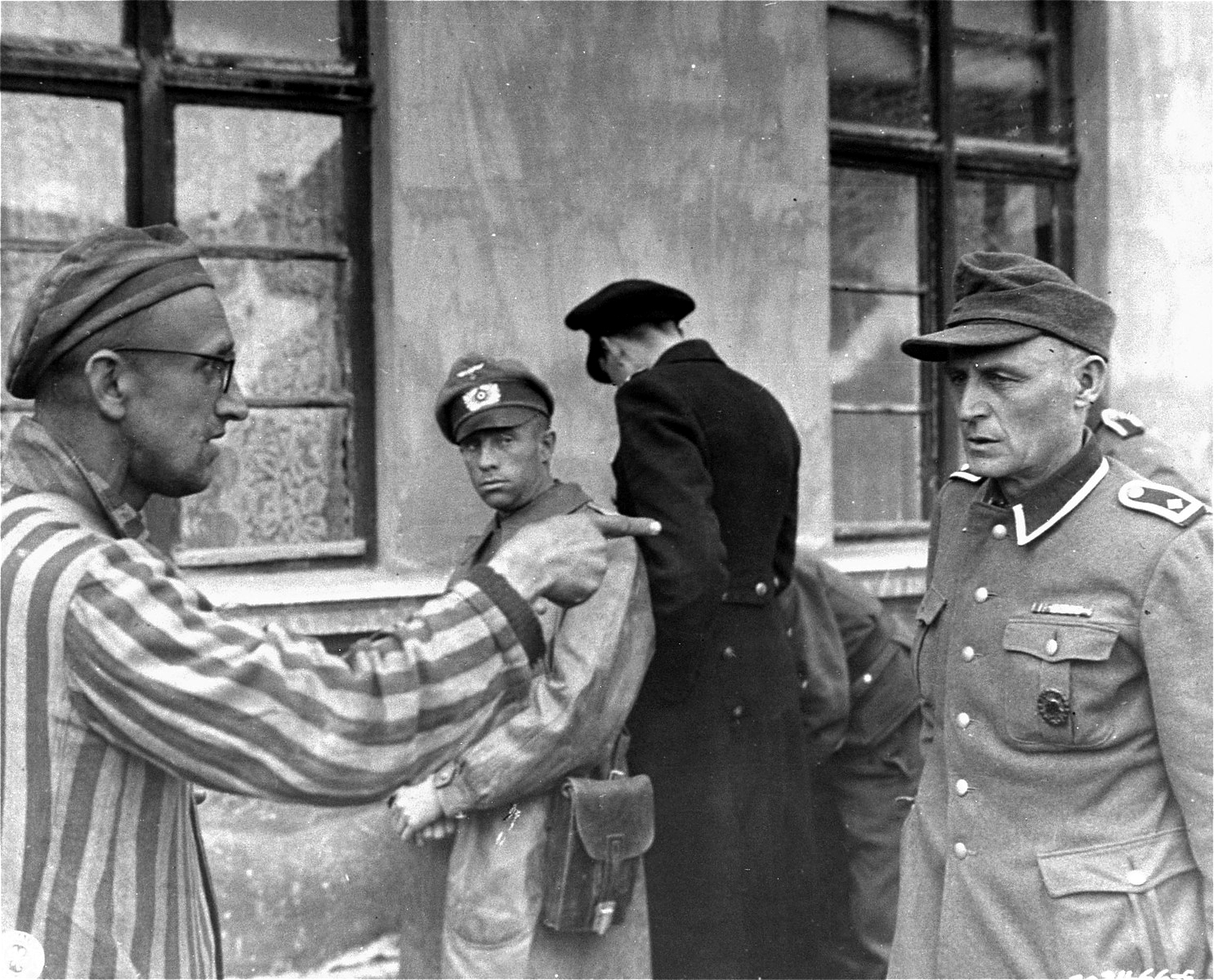
Prisoner of KZ Buchenwald with member of SS personnel after entry of U.S. Army, 1945

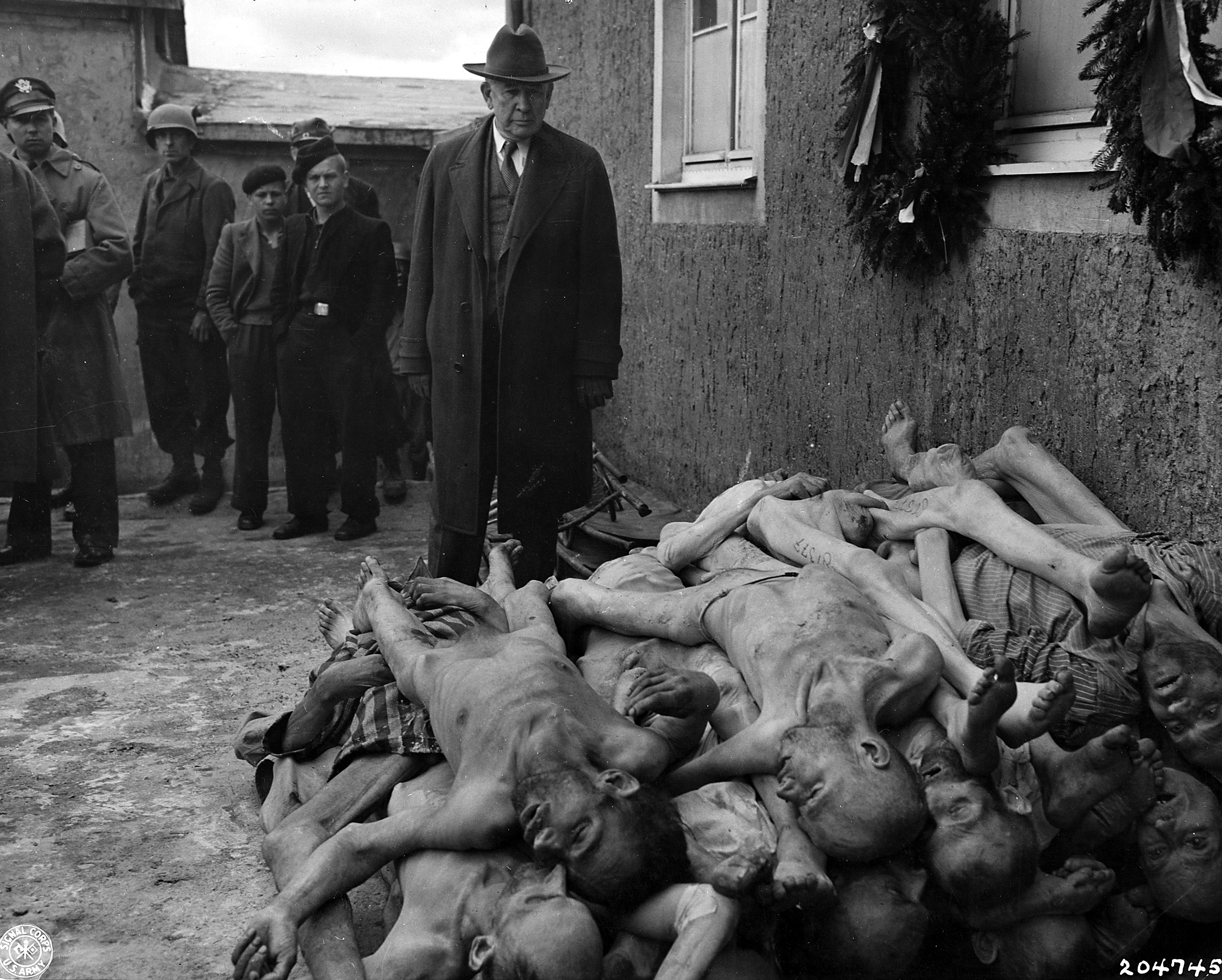
U.S. Senator Alben W. Barkley (D-Kentucky) looks on after Buchenwald's liberation.

'Orphans of Buchenwald Ex-Prisoners Coming Home Air Views HQ and Camps (1945)' – film from US National Archives

In April 1945 an Alsos Mission team was searching for a German nuclear physicist near Weimar, eastern Germany. Allied soldiers discovered the camp while traveling through the woods nearby the camp to avoid detection by German forces. Upon smelling a foul odor coming from a nearby clearing, the team saw a large barbed wire enclosure, containing several emaciated prisoners and corpses. After discovering the camp the team radioed the Army to send medical assitance before returning to their previous assignment. Survivors had recently taken control of the camp from the few remaining guards when it was discovered. The four-man team was under linguist Hugh Montgomery and included Corporal Rick Carrier. Montgomery recalled the survivors made a final request: Please give the guards to us, and we’ll take care of them ..... And I’m sure they did. Montgomery later joined the CIA, and took part in Operation Gold in Berlin.

On 4 April 1945 the U.S. 89th Infantry Division overran Ohrdruf, a subcamp of Buchenwald.

Buchenwald was partially evacuated by the Germans from the 6th to 11th of April 1945. In the days before the arrival of the American army, thousands of the prisoners were forcibly evacuated on foot. Polish engineer and short-wave radio-amateur Gwidon Damazyn, an inmate since March 1941, managed to build a short-wave transmitter and small generator and hid them in the prisoners' cinema. On 8 April at noon, Damazyn and Russian prisoner Konstantin Ivanovich Leonov sent the Morse code message prepared by leaders of the prisoners' underground resistance (believed to be Walter Bartel and Harry Kuhn):

To the Allies. To the army of General Patton. This is the Buchenwald concentration camp. SOS. We request help. They want to evacuate us. The SS wants to destroy us.

The text was repeated several times in English, German, and Russian. Damazyn sent the English and German transmissions, while Leonov sent the Russian version. Three minutes after the last transmission sent by Damazyn, the headquarters of the U.S. Third Army responded:

KZ Bu. Hold out. Rushing to your aid. Staff of Third Army.

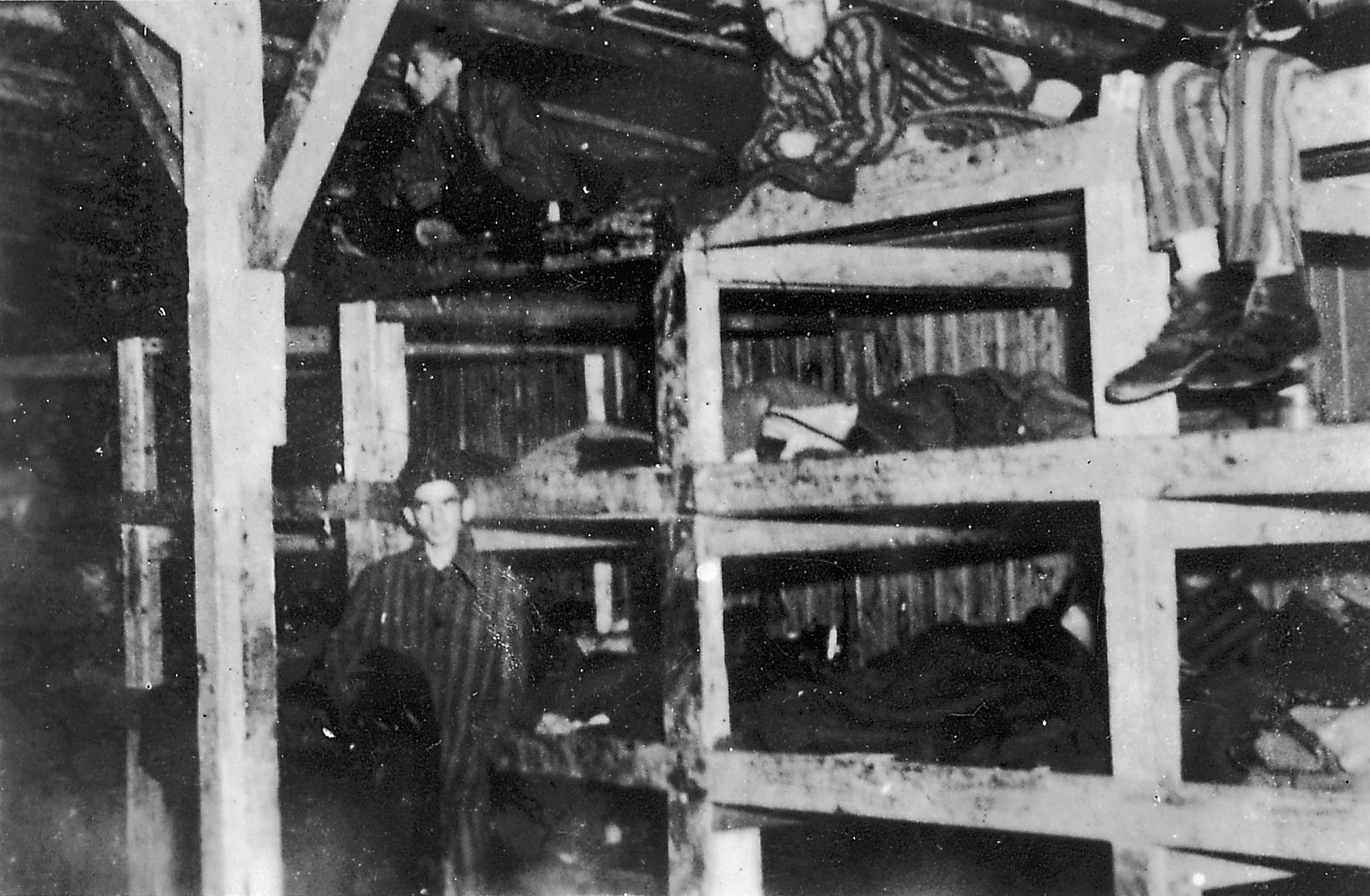
Interior of the barracks, pictured after liberation by Jules Rouard on 16 April 1945

According to Teofil Witek, a fellow Polish prisoner who witnessed the transmissions, Damazyn fainted after receiving the message.

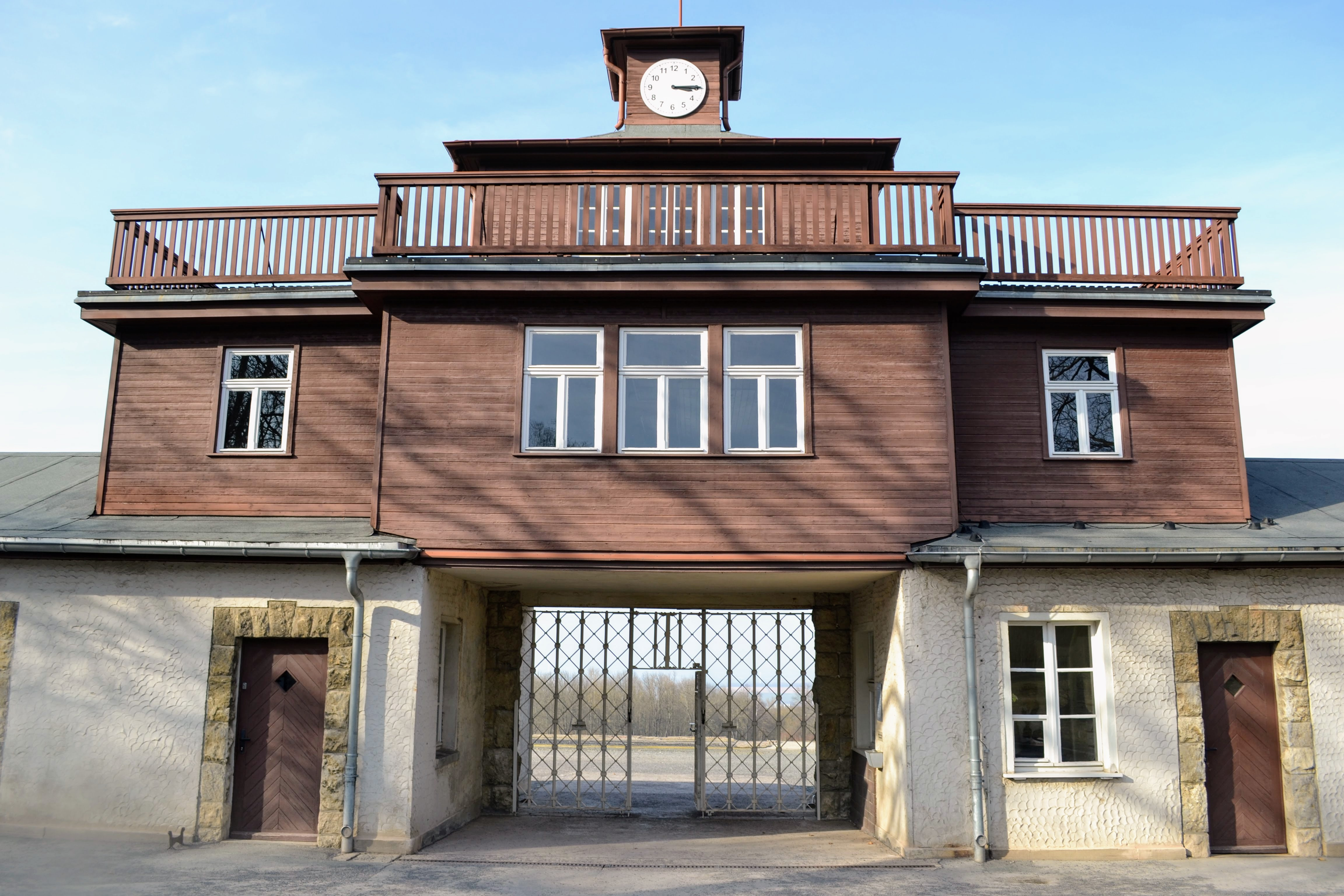
3:15 p.m. was the time the camp was liberated, and is the permanent time of the clock at the entrance gate.

As American forces closed in, Gestapo headquarters at Weimar telephoned the camp administration to announce that it was sending explosives to blow up any evidence of the camp, including its inmates. The Gestapo did not know that the administrators had already fled. A prisoner answered the phone and informed headquarters that explosives would not be needed, as the camp had already been blown up, which was not true.

A detachment of troops of the U.S. 9th Armored Infantry Battalion, from the 6th Armored Division, part of the U.S. Third Army, and under the command of Captain Frederic Keffer, arrived at Buchenwald on 11 April 1945 at 3:15 p.m. (now the permanent time of the clock at the entrance gate). The arrival of American soldiers was met with great celebration by the prisoners, who reportedly lifted the incoming Americans into the air in exultation.

Later in the day, elements of the U.S. 83rd Infantry Division overran Langenstein, one of a number of smaller camps comprising the Buchenwald complex. There, the division liberated over 21,000 prisoners, ordered the mayor of Langenstein to send food and water to the camp, and rushed medical supplies forward from the 20th Field Hospital.

Third Army Headquarters sent elements of the 80th Infantry Division to take control of the camp on the morning of Thursday 12 April 1945. Several journalists arrived on the same day, including Edward R. Murrow, whose radio report of his arrival and reception was broadcast on CBS and became one of his most famous:

I asked to see one of the barracks. It happened to be occupied by Czechoslovaks. When I entered, men crowded around, tried to lift me to their shoulders. They were too weak. Many of them could not get out of bed. I was told that this building had once stabled 80 horses. There were 1,200 men in it, five to a bunk. The stink was beyond all description.

They called the doctor. We inspected his records. There were only names in the little black book, nothing more. Nothing about who these men were, what they had done, or hoped. Behind the names of those who had died, there was a cross. I counted them. They totaled 242. 242 out of 1,200, in one month.

As we walked out into the courtyard, a man fell dead. Two others, they must have been over 60, were crawling toward the latrine. I saw it, but will not describe it.

— Extract from Edward R. Murrow's Buchenwald Report – 15 April 1945.

=== Civilian tour ===
After Patton toured the camp, he ordered the mayor of Weimar to bring 1,000 citizens to Buchenwald; these were to be predominantly men of military age from the middle and upper classes. The Germans had to walk a 25-kilometre (16-mile) roundtrip under American armed guard and were shown the crematorium and conditions within the camp. The tours were intended to ensure that the German people would take responsibility for atrocities perpetrated by the Nazis and prevent their dissmissal as atrocity propaganda. Dwight Eisenhower also invited two groups of Americans to tour the camp in mid-April 1945; journalists and editors from some of the principal U.S. publications, and then a dozen members of the Congress from both the House and the Senate, led by Senate Majority Leader Alben W. Barkley.

War correspondent Osmar White reported that above the crematorium door was a verse beginning 'Worms shall not devour me, but flames consume this body. I always loved the heat and light...'.

== Soviet internment camp ==
Between August 1945 and 1 March 1950, Buchenwald was the site of NKVD special camp Nr. 2, where the Soviet secret police imprisoned former Nazis and anti-communist dissidents. According to Soviet records, 28,455 people were detained, 7,113 of whom died. Upon its closure, Soviet authorities destroyed much of the site to prevent discovery of their use of the camp.

== Aftermath ==
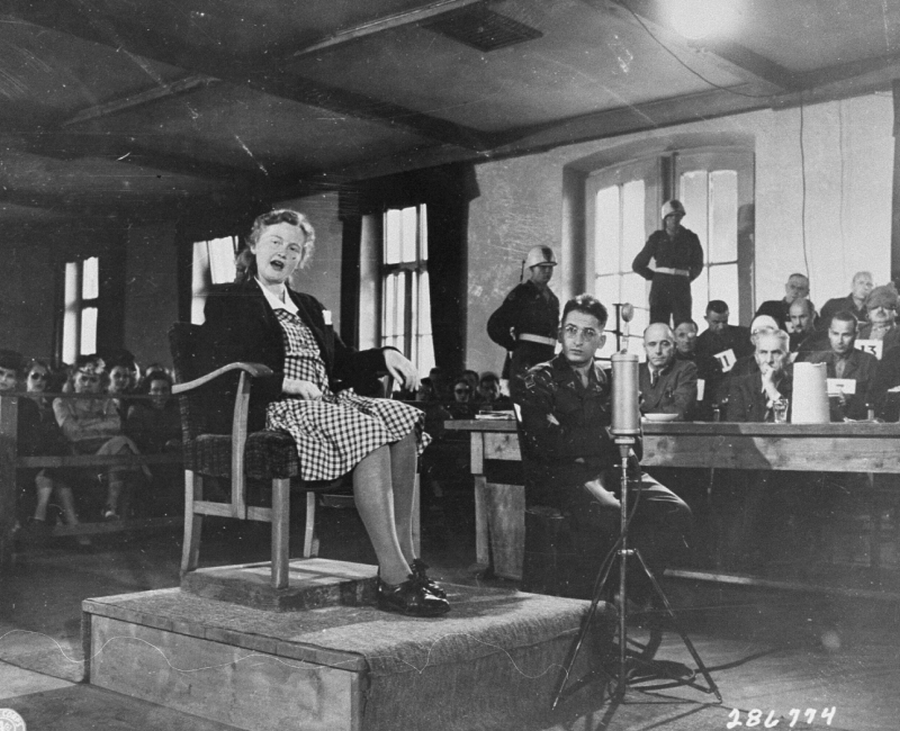
Ilse Koch testifies.

=== Buchenwald trial ===
Thirty SS perpetrators at Buchenwald were tried before a US military tribunal in 1947, including Higher SS and Police Leader Josias Erbprinz zu Waldeck und Pyrmont, who oversaw the SS district that Buchenwald was located in, and many doctors involved in Nazi human experimentation. Almost all of the defendants were convicted, with 22 sentenced to death. However, only nine death sentences were carried out, and by the mid-1950s, all perpetrators had been freed except for Ilse Koch, who was tried by a West German court and given a life sentence. Additional perpetrators were tried before German courts during the 1960s.

=== Memorialisation ===
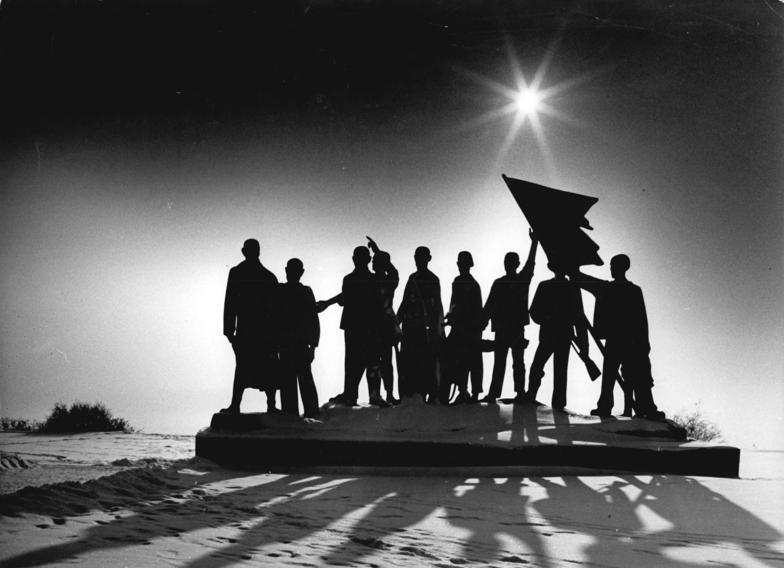
Buchenwald memorial by Fritz Cremer

Between August 1945 and 1 March 1950, Buchenwald was the site of an NKVD internment camp. After the Stalinist camp was closed, much of the site was razed, while signs were erected to provide a Soviet interpretation of the camp's legacy.

The first monument to victims was erected by Buchenwald inmates days after the initial liberation. It was made of wood and only intended to be temporary. A second monument to commemorate the dead was erected in 1958 by the German Democratic Republic (GDR) government near the mass graves. It was inaugurated on 14 September 1958 by GDR Prime Minister Otto Grotewohl. Inside the camp, there is a stainless steel monument on the spot where the first, temporary monument stood. Its surface is maintained at 37 °C (99 °F), the temperature of human skin, all year round.

The three National Memorials of the GDR, built next to or on the sites of the former concentration camps Buchenwald, Sachsenhausen, and Ravensbrück, played a central role in the GDR's remembrance policy under Erich Honecker. They were government controlled through the Ministry of Culture. According to their statute, these memorials served as places of identification and legitimisation of the GDR. The use of the memorials as political objects became particularly clear during the major celebrations of the liberation of the concentration camps, as historian Anne-Kathleen Tillack-Graf analysis in her thesis about the official party newspaper Neues Deutschland.

Today the Buchenwald camp site serves as a Holocaust memorial. It has a museum with permanent exhibitions about the history of the camp. It is managed by Buchenwald and Mittelbau-Dora Memorials Foundation, which also looks after the camp memorial at Mittelbau-Dora.

=== Literature ===
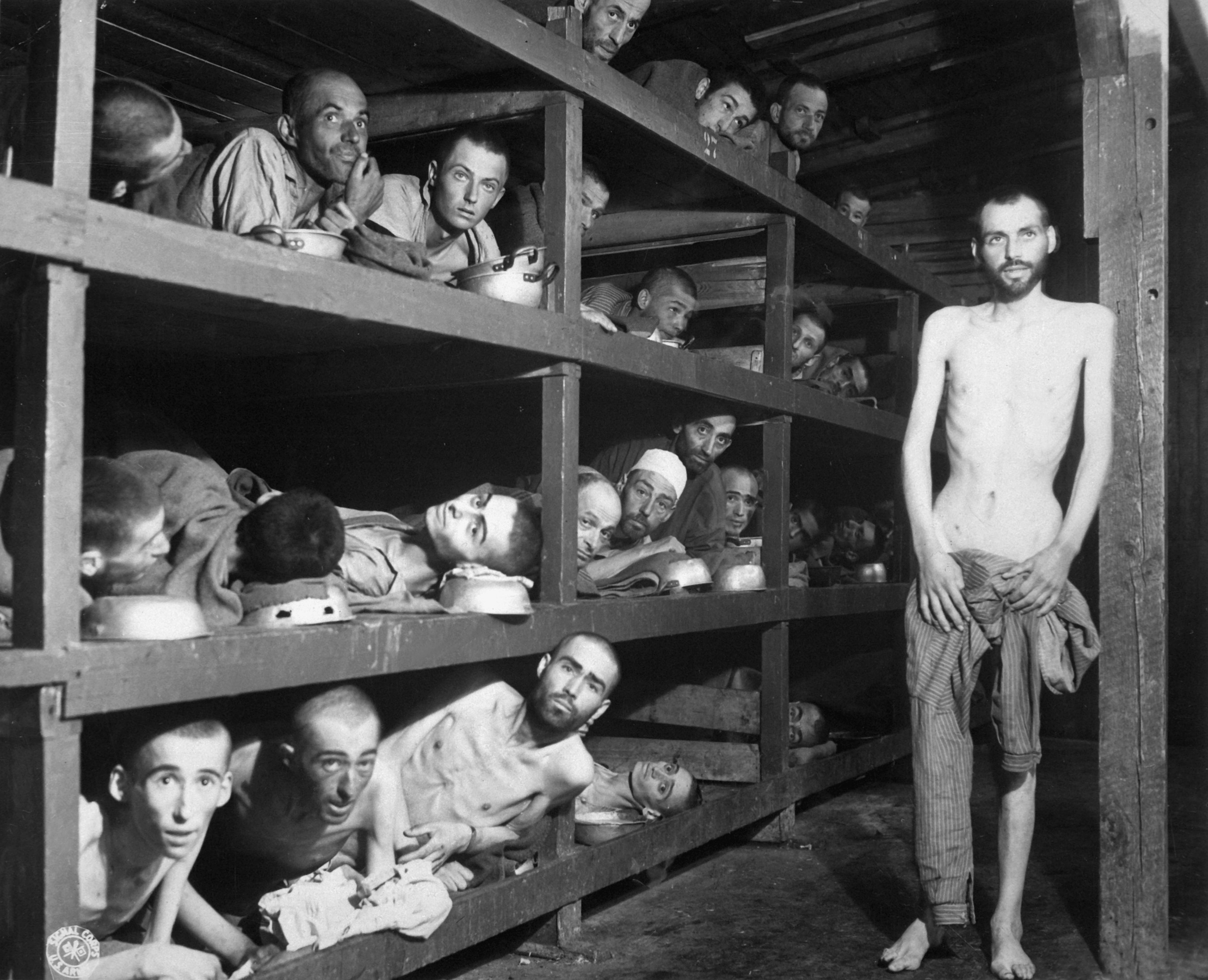
Slave laborers at Buchenwald after liberation in 1945. Elie Wiesel is seen in the second row, seventh from left.

Survivors who have written about their camp experiences include Jorge Semprún, who in Quel beau dimanche! describes conversations involving Goethe and Léon Blum, and Ernst Wiechert, whose Der Totenwald was written in 1939 but not published until 1945, and which likewise involved Goethe. Scholars have investigated how camp inmates used art to help deal with their circumstances, and according to Theodor Ziolkowski writers often did so by turning to Goethe. Artist Léon Delarbre sketched, besides other scenes of camp life, the Goethe Oak, under which he used to sit and write. One of the few prisoners who escaped from the camp, the Belgian Edmond Vandievoet, recounted his experiences in his book "I escaped from a Nazi Death Camp" [Editions Jourdan, 2015]. In his work Night, Elie Wiesel talks about his stay in Buchenwald, including his father's death. Jacques Lusseyran, a leader in the underground resistance to the German occupation of France, was eventually sent to Buchenwald after being arrested, and described his time there in his autobiography. Imre Kertész (1929–2016), a Hungarian Jewish author and Nobel laureate, was deported to Buchenwald as a 15-year-old boy in 1944. His semi-autobiographical novel Fatelessness (Sorstalanság), which draws directly from his experiences in Buchenwald and Auschwitz, earned him the Nobel Prize in Literature in 2002.

=== Visit by Chancellor Merkel and President Obama ===
Video of Merkel's and Obama's visit

On 5 June 2009 German Chancellor Angela Merkel and U.S. President Barack Obama visited Buchenwald after a tour of Dresden Castle and Church of Our Lady. During the visit they were accompanied by Elie Wiesel and Bertrand Herz, both survivors of the camp. Volkhard Knigge, the director of the Buchenwald and Mittelbau-Dora Memorials Foundation and honorary professor of University of Jena, guided the four guests through the remainder of the site of the camp. During the visit Wiesel, who together with Herz were sent to the Little camp when they were 16, said, "if these trees could talk.", noting the contrast between the natural scenery and purpose of the camps. Obama mentioned during his visit that he had heard stories as a child from his great uncle, who was part of the 89th Infantry Division, the first Americans to reach the camp at Ohrdruf, one of Buchenwald's satellites. Obama was the first sitting US president to visit the Buchenwald concentration camp.

=== Controversy ===
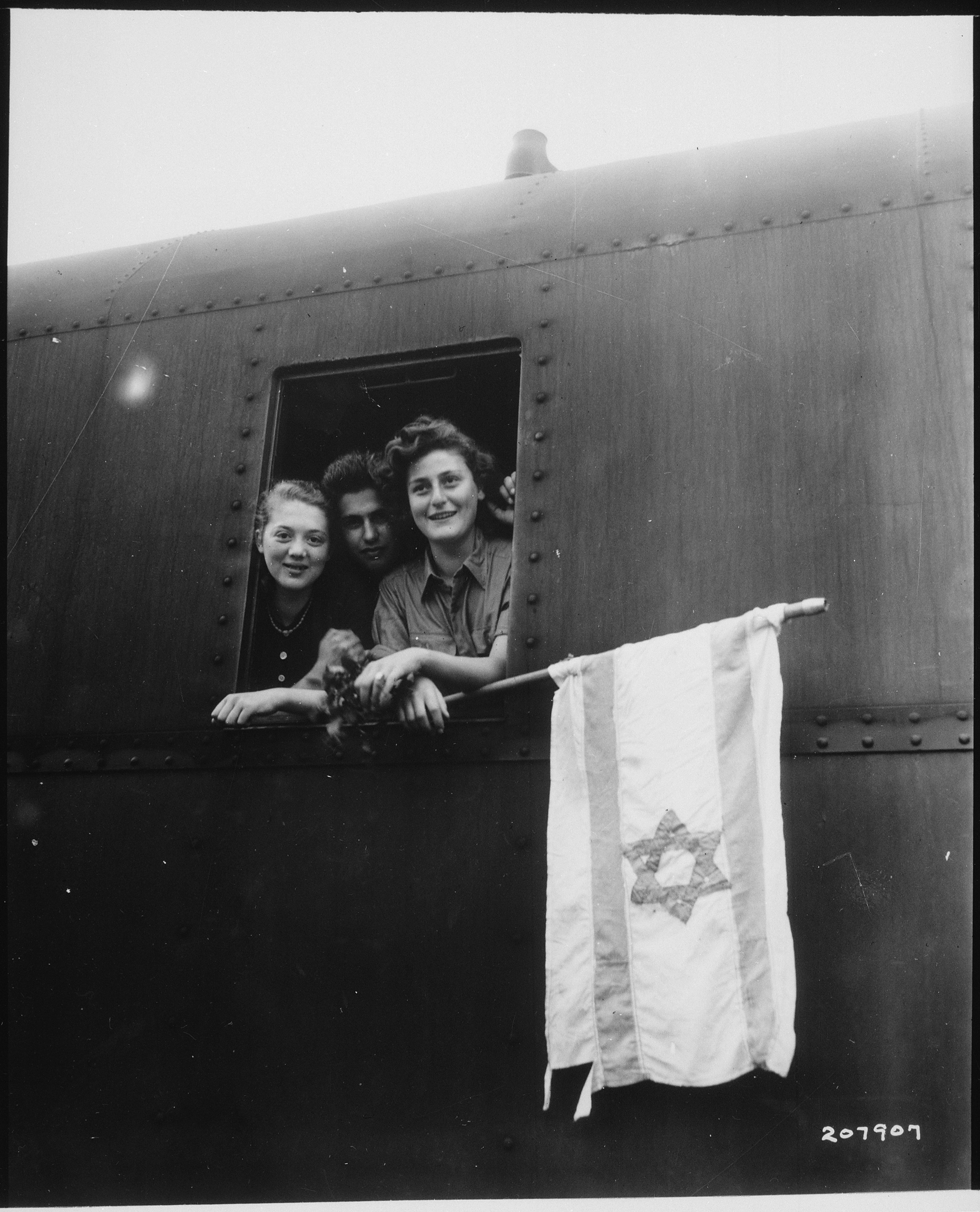
Jewish children on their way to Palestine after having been released from the Buchenwald Concentration Camp, holding a homemade flag

In January 2019, the Buchenwald memorial foundation barred representatives of the far-right Alternative for Germany (AfD) from attending a Holocaust commemoration ceremony, citing anti-democratic, racist, and historically revisionist tendencies associated with the party. In August 2025, the memorial also drew attention after a dispute over the wearing of a keffiyeh at a commemorative event; a German court later upheld the memorial's authority to refuse entry in that context. The memorial was again involved in controversy in 2025 after postponing a planned speech by the German-Israeli philosopher Omri Boehm for the 80th anniversary of the camp's liberation.

In April 2026, an anti-Zionist group, Kufiyas in Buchenwald, announced plans to hold a rally connected to the Buchenwald concentration camp memorial around the anniversary of the camp's liberation. The rally was organized in response to the memorial's restrictions on pro-Palestinian symbols, including the keffiyeh. The group alleged that the memorial had become a site of "historical revisionism and genocide denial," while Jens-Christian Wagner, director of the Buchenwald Foundation, said that criticism of Israeli government policy was legitimate but became antisemitic when it relativized the Holocaust or discredited its victims. The planned rally was criticized by Felix Klein, the European Jewish Congress, and several Jewish communal and academic groups. The city of Weimar barred the rally from being held at the memorial site and offered a square in the city centre as an alternative venue. The organizers said they would challenge the decision in court, arguing that the event was intended to commemorate victims of genocide and fascism and to oppose the war in Gaza. A court in Weimar later upheld the restriction on holding the protest at the memorial.

== See also ==
- Buchenwald Resistance
- List of subcamps of Buchenwald
- Number of deaths in Buchenwald
- Ohrdruf forced labor camp
- Persecution of Jehovah's Witnesses in Nazi Germany
- The Boys of Buchenwald
- List of prisoners of Buchenwald
