= Rüsselsheim massacre =

1944 war crime committed by German civilians on American airmen

The Rüsselsheim massacre was a war crime that involved the beating and murder of six American airmen by townspeople of Rüsselsheim during World War II.

The incident happened on August 26, 1944, two days after a Consolidated B-24 Liberator bomber of the United States Army Air Forces was shot down by heavy anti-aircraft fire over Hanover. All nine crew members of the aircraft (2nd Lt. Norman J. Rogers, Jr., pilot; 2nd Lt. John N. Sekul, copilot; F/O Haigus Tufenkjian, navigator and bombardier; Sgt. William M. Adams, nose gunner, S/Sgt. Forrest W. Brininstool, top turret gunner and flight engineer; S/Sgt. Thomas D. Williams Jr., radio operator; Sgt. William A. Dumont, belly gunner; Sgt. Sidney E. Brown, tail gunner; Sgt. Elmore L. Austin, waist gunner) parachuted to the ground, where they were captured and held by German Luftwaffe personnel. Unable to transfer the downed aircrewmen to a prisoner-of-war camp due to the train tracks being heavily damaged by bombing the night before, they forced the Americans to march through the devastated town of Rüsselsheim to catch another train.

The townspeople, already angered by damage caused to their town by a Canadian bombing raid the previous night on the Opel automobile factory, which was manufacturing airplane parts during the war, attacked the crew members with rocks, hammers, sticks, and shovels, killing six of them.

== Background ==
During World War II, Rüsselsheim, an industrial town that housed many key targets, including the Opel plant, was bombed several times by the Royal Air Force (RAF). The RAF followed a policy of "area bombing" of cities at night while the United States Army Air Forces (USAAF) relied on "precision bombing" by day.

British and American authorities found that at least 2,462 Allied airmen were known to have been lynched or abused by civilians in their occupation zones, of which 1,015 were killed. This figure is a low estimate, as it does not include those lynched in former eastern territories of Germany or the Soviet and French occupation zones. Furthermore, the British figure is relatively low despite their occupation zone being heavily bombed. The small number of trials conducted by the British suggests that they lacked the resources to carry through their work to completion.

== Shot down ==
On the afternoon of August 24, 1944, an American B-24J-135-CO Liberator bomber, serial number 42-110107 and nicknamed Wham! Bam! Thank You Ma'am, commanded by 2nd Lt. Norman J. Rogers Jr, was seriously damaged by German antiaircraft fire while taking part in an attack on an airfield in Hanover and the entire crew bailed out near Hutterup. A lookout alerted both the local fire brigade and the military detachment at the nearby airfield and patrols were dispatched to find the downed Americans. One of the nine airmen, S/Sgt. Forrest W. Brininstool, had serious injuries to his abdomen. After landing on the farm, he was given first aid by an elderly couple, and in return, Brininstool gave them his silk parachute, a valuable item for peasants. Within a few hours, most of the crew were captured by German personnel and taken into an interrogation room in the town hall in Greven. After that, most of the crew members, including Rogers, were taken to an air base near the town where they slept for the night. On the insistence of Rogers, Brininstool was taken to a medical clinic by German troops, where he was operated on for shrapnel wounds, then was moved to a hospital in Münster to undergo a second operation.

The next morning, Brininstool still remained behind in the hospital while the others were loaded onto a train for a trip south to the Dulag Luft in Oberursel, north of Frankfurt. At every stop along the way, after German civilians noticed the Americans on the train, crowds would form at the windows, shouting in anger at the "terror flyers," shaking their fists, and spitting at them.

On the night of August 25, the RAF sent 116 Avro Lancasters to Rüsselsheim in order to attack the Opel factory on a bombing mission, dropping 674 907 kg (2,000 lb) bombs and more than 400,000 incendiaries on the city, destroying the plant and damaging the rail tracks, more by far than any previous air raid on Rüsselsheim in World War II. Toward the end of the bombing raid, a German air raid warden, Josef Hartgen, mobilized residents in Rüsselsheim to put out the fires in their homes.

== Beating and Shooting ==
On the morning of August 26, most of the American bomber crewmen were still proceeding to their original destination. However, the train line was heavily damaged by the Royal Air Force the previous night so the airmen were taken off the train and forced to walk to Rüsselsheim to catch another train. The prisoners were escorted by two German soldiers. As the Americans marched through Rüsselsheim, the townspeople, assuming the fliers were Canadians who had taken part in the previous night's raid, quickly formed and immediately turned into an uncontrollable angry mob.

Two women, Margarete Witzler and Käthe Reinhardt, shouted out, "There are the terror flyers. Tear them to pieces! Beat them to death! They have destroyed our houses!" One of the crew members replied in German, "It wasn't us! We didn't bomb Rüsselsheim!" Nevertheless, one woman threw a brick at the crew and that precipitated a riot during which the townspeople attacked the prisoners with rocks, hammers, sticks and shovels. Three Opel workers arrived with iron bars and started beating the men to death to the cries of the crowd.

The mob was joined by air raid warden Josef Hartgen, who was armed with a pistol. The German soldiers who guarded the crew-members made no attempt to prevent the beatings. After the airmen collapsed from the beatings, Hartgen lined them up in the curb and shot six in the head, but ran out of ammunition, leaving two of the airmen, William M. Adams and Sidney E. Brown, alive. The mob then put the airmen on a cart and took them to a cemetery. Those who moaned were further beaten.

During the attack, an air raid siren sounded and the mob ran for cover. Adams and Brown managed to crawl from the bloody cart and fled toward the Rhine River, avoiding capture for four days. However, they were discovered by a policeman and taken to their original destination, the camp in Oberursel where they remained until after the war in Europe ended.

== Trial and execution ==
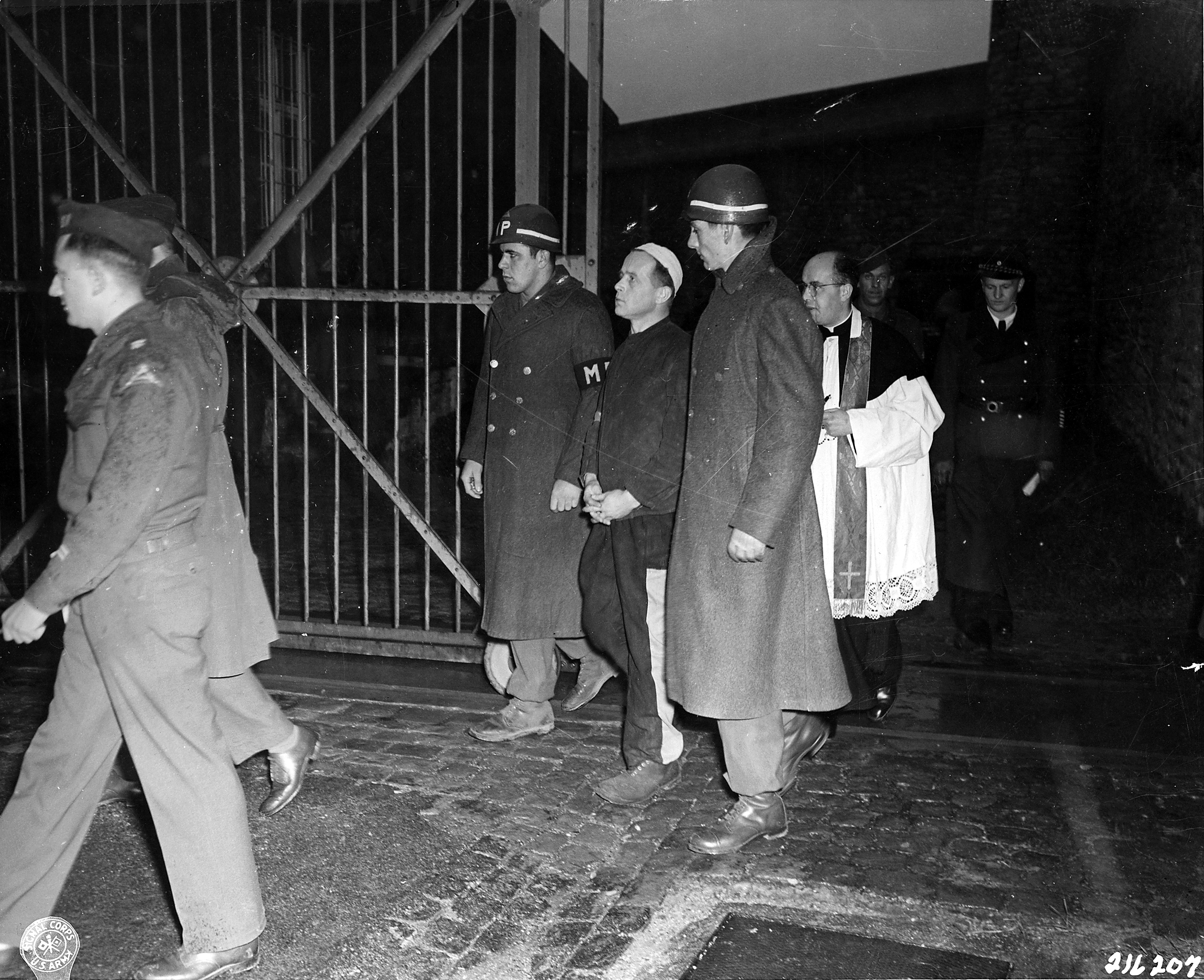
Josef Hartgen being led to his execution, 1945

After the war ended in Europe in May 1945, Rüsselsheim was occupied by the U.S. Army. The killings were reported and the bodies were located on 28 June 1945. Eleven residents of Rüsselsheim, including Josef Hartgen, were arrested and put on trial in the town of Darmstadt in late July 1945.

The defense for the townspeople argued that they had been incited to commit the crime by Goebbels' propaganda, which encouraged the German people to take reprisals against downed Allied airmen, and were thus not to bear the guilt for their actions. Lieutenant Colonel Leon Jaworski, who would achieve fame three decades later as the special prosecutor in the Watergate scandal, insisted on the individual responsibility of the defendants for the murders.

"They were all grown men and women. If they are called on to commit the murder and they do, they are just as responsible as any other murderers."

The chief investigator in the case, Luke Rogers, was also unsympathetic, claiming that the townspeople had committed the massacre out of a sense of entitlement. He pointed out that while there had been countless instances of Allied towns being bombed just as badly as Rüsselsheim, every single case of downed pilots being beaten and murdered had come from Germany.

The acts of violence against the surrendered Americans by residents of Rüsselsheim constituted a violation of the laws of war. In Article 2 of the 1929 Geneva Convention on the Prisoners of War, it was provided that: "Prisoners of war are in the power of the hostile Power, but not of the individuals or corps who have captured them. They must at all times be humanely treated and protected, particularly against acts of violence, insults, and public curiosity. Measures of reprisal against them are prohibited." Also, Article 23 of the 1907 Hague Convention IV - The Laws and Customs of War on Land states that: "In addition to the prohibitions provided by special Conventions, it is especially forbidden....(c) To kill or wound an enemy who, having laid down his arms, or having no longer means of defence, has surrendered at discretion". Germany was a signatory to both conventions. It was specified that German civilians were bound to observe the laws of war since international law was binding upon belligerents under all circumstances and conditions.

The trial lasted six days, with eyewitness testimony to the killings by Josef Hartgen; and accounts of the bludgeoning of the airmen.

On August 2, Josef Hartgen, Johannes Siepel, Phillip Gutlich, Friedrich Wust, Johannes Opper, Margarete Witzler, and Käthe Reinhardt were found guilty and sentenced to death. One person was acquitted by the commission. Two other defendants, Heinrich Barthel and August Wolf, were each sentenced to 15 years in prison with hard labor, while the last, Georg Daum, was sentenced to 25 years in prison with hard labor. After Margarete's husband and Reinhardt's brother-in-law pleaded for mercy on their behalf, saying that their only crime was screaming at the pilots, their death sentences were commuted to 30 years in prison with hard labor. On November 10, 1945, Hartgen and the four others were hanged at the prison in Bruchsal. Another attacker, Franz Umstatter, was tried for his participation in 1946. Witnesses said he stomped on the victims so hard his boots broke, and that he came home with broken boots. He was found guilty and sentenced to death. However, Umstatter's conviction was overturned on a technicality in 1948. A sixth, Otto Stolz, was convicted and sentenced to death in May 1947. He was executed by hanging at Landsberg Prison on November 14, 1947.

Witzler and Reinhardt were both paroled on December 19, 1953. Reinhardt died on November 11, 1958, and Witzler died on January 7, 1976. Barthel and Wolf were both paroled on December 21, 1953. Barthel died on February 2, 1965, and Wolf died on May 11, 1981. Daum was paroled on February 5, 1954, and died on July 27, 1955. All of the defendants returned to their homes in Rüsselsheim. Residents often debated behind their backs what roles they had played in the massacre.

== Recognition ==
On the 75th anniversary of the Russelsheim Massacre, co-pilot 2nd Lt. John N. Sekul of the Bronx was honored with a co-street naming on the block where he lived prior to his military service.
