= Martin Sommer =

German concentration camp guard (1915–1988)

- Born: Walter Gerhard Martin Sommer; 8 February 1915; Schkölen, German Empire
- Died: 7 June 1988 (aged 73); Schwarzenbruck, West Germany
- Military career
- Allegiance: Nazi Germany
- Branch: Schutzstaffel
- Service years: 1938–1945
- Rank: Hauptscharführer
- Nickname: Hangman of Buchenwald

Walter Gerhard Martin Sommer (8 February 1915 – 7 June 1988) was a German SS Hauptscharführer (master sergeant) who served as a guard at the concentration camps of Dachau and Buchenwald. Sommer, known as the "Hangman of Buchenwald", was considered a depraved sadist who reportedly ordered two Austrian priests, Otto Neururer and Matthias Spanlang, to be crucified upside-down.

== Buchenwald ==
In 1943, Reichsführer Heinrich Himmler appointed SS judge Georg Konrad Morgen to investigate charges of corruption at the Buchenwald camp. Due to his excessive brutality and sadism, Sommer was indicted and tried before Morgen. Commandant Karl Koch and his wife Ilse Koch were also put on trial.

According to Morgen, Sommer had a secret compartment underneath the floor under his desk. He kept his private instruments of torture concealed within this compartment such as the needles he used to kill his victims after he had finished torturing them; he would inject them with carbolic acid, or inject air into their veins causing death by embolism. On occasions, after private late-night torture sessions, Sommer would hide his victims' bodies under his bed until he could dispose of them in the morning.

Among his acts of depravity were beating a German pastor, hanging him naked outside in the winter then throwing buckets of water on him and letting him freeze to death. On another occasion, Sommer beat a Catholic priest to death for performing the Sacrament of Penance for a fellow inmate.

In the spring of 1943, Sommer was transferred to a regular combat division. He served in the 9th SS Panzer Division Hohenstaufen until August 1943, when he was recalled. Sommer was then arrested and charged with embezzlement and committing unauthorized murders in the camp. Sommer initially denied his guilt, but he eventually admitted to secretly killing 40 to 50 prisoners. According to Sommer's own testimony in 1967, he was only charged with two counts of murder and one count of attempted murder. The court had refused to allow him to testify about unauthorized murders he committed on Koch's personal orders.

It is not known whether Sommer was actually convicted of any charges. However, after the trial, he was sentenced to probation on the front lines. On 8 April 1945, Sommer was critically injured after an American bomber plane with a full payload crashed next to his tank. Sommer suffered injuries to his left arm, right leg and stomach. The injuries to his left arm and right leg were severe enough that both had to be amputated.

After recovering from his injuries, Sommer was interned by American occupation authorities due to his SS membership. However, he managed to conceal his identity and thus avoid what would have been a near certain death sentence in the Buchenwald trial. Sommer was released from internment in June 1947 and sent to a home for the disabled. A former prisoner recognized him later that year, which led to his arrest in February 1950. However, the charges were initially dropped due to his wartime injuries.

== Retrial and imprisonment ==
Sommer married, fathered a child and filed for and received a pension for his service-related disabilities. In 1957, he was indicted for complicity in the death of 101 concentration camp inmates. In July 1958 in Bayreuth district court in West Germany, he was ultimately convicted of 25 deaths and received a life sentence. Upon appeal, the case was upheld in May 1959 by the Federal Court. In 1971, Sommer was transferred to a hospital in Bad Tölz since there was no facility in prison to continue the treatment of his wartime injuries. Sommer requested clemency from Bavarian Minister-President Alfons Goppel, who rejected the request but agreed to transfer him to a nursing home. Sommer subsequently lived in a nursing home from 1973 to his death in 1988. He was officially prohibited from leaving the nursing home but violated this condition regularly and without sanction.
