= Number of deaths in Buchenwald =

Deaths in German concentration camp

The number of deaths in the Buchenwald concentration camp is estimated to have been 56,545, a mortality rate of 20% averaged over all prisoners transferred to the camp between its founding in 1937 and its liberation in 1945. Deaths were due both to the harsh conditions of life in the camp and also to the executions carried out by camp overseers.

According to the records of the Nazi Schutzstaffel (SS) in charge of overseeing the camp, the total number of deaths was 33,462; however, this tabulation does not include prisoners executed before 1944 (euphemistically listed as "transferred to Gestapo"), prisoners who were executed immediately upon arrival at the camp, or mass killings of Soviet prisoners of war.

== Background ==
The Buchenwald concentration camp was established in 1937, 10 kilometers from Weimar. The prisoners of the camp were Jews, political prisoners, religious prisoners and prisoners of war. They came from Russia, Poland, France, Germany, Austria, Ukraine and other countries.

The American army liberated Buchenwald on 11 April 1945. In the days before, thousands of the prisoners were evacuated by the retreating German camp guards. An estimated 13,500 prisoners died in this evacuation process.

== Death count calculation ==
One cause of the deaths in the concentration camp Buchenwald was illness due to the harsh conditions in the camp. Furthermore, many were murdered. The two primary methods of murder were shooting in the back of the head and hanging.

The SS accounts of prisoners coming to and leaving the camp provide one source for the estimate of the number of deaths in Buchenwald. These numbers were divided into three categories: releases, transfers, and deaths. According to this material, 33,462 died in Buchenwald. There are flaws, however, in these accounts. For example, people executed before 1944 were listed as ”transferred to Gestapo”. Newly arrived prisoners who were sent for immediate execution were not listed in the camp register. From 1941, the mass killings of Soviet prisoners of war went unrecorded.

One former prisoner of Buchenwald, Armin Walter, made a calculation of the number of executions by shooting in the back of the head. While incarcerated, he was instructed to set up and maintain a radio installation in the facility where the executions took place. He counted the numbers, which came via telex, and hid this information. He says that 8,483 Soviet prisoners of war were shot in this manner.

In "Buchenwald: Mahnung und Verpflichtung: Dokumente und Berichte," by Walter Bartel, the number of deaths in Buchenwald is estimated at 56,545. This number is the sum of:

- The number of deaths according to material left behind by the SS: 33,462.
- Executions by shooting: 8,483.
- Executions by hanging (estimate): 1,100.
- Deaths during evacuation transports: 13,500.

This total (56,545) corresponds to a death rate of 20 percent, assuming that the number of persons passing through the camp was 280,000.

== Allied airmen ==
On 20 August 1944, 168 captured Allied airmen classified as "Terrorflieger" (terror flier) by the Gestapo, arrived at Buchenwald. The most common act for allied airmen to be classified a terror flier was to be captured in civilian clothing and/or without their dog tags. The German Foreign Office decided that these captured enemy airmen should not be given the legal status of prisoner of war (POWs) but should instead be treated as criminals and spies and were sent to Buchenwald.

Unknown to all airmen except Lamason, their execution had been scheduled for 26 October, had they remained at Buchenwald. However, on the night of 19 October, seven days before their scheduled execution, 156 of the 168 airmen, including Lamason, were transferred from Buchenwald to Stalag Luft III by the Luftwaffe. Eleven airmen were left behind in Buchenwald (British pilot P.D. Hemmens had already died), as they were too ill to be moved. US pilot L.C. Beck subsequently died, but the other ten airmen were transported to Stalag Luft III, in small groups, over a period of several weeks.

== Deaths among the deported Danish policemen ==
Of the 1,960 deported Danish policemen who came to Buchenwald in late September and early October 1944, 62 (3%) died in Buchenwald. One reason for the lower death rate was the help these policemen received in the form of packets provided by the Danish Red Cross. Furthermore, their length of the stay was relatively short. On 16 December 1944, 1,604 of the policemen were transferred to Mühlberg after their status was changed to prisoners of war.

== See also ==
- List of Nazi-German concentration camps
- KLB Club
