= Otto Neururer =

First priest to be killed in a Nazi concentration camp

Blessed Otto Neururer
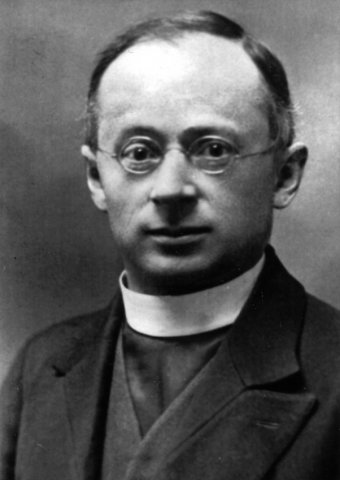
- Neururer in 1922
- Church: Roman Catholic Church

Orders
- Ordination: 29 June 1907 by Josef Altenweisel

Personal details
- Born: Otto Neururer; 25 March 1882 Piller, Tyrol, Austria-Hungary
- Died: 30 May 1940 (aged 58) Buchenwald, Gau Thuringia, Germany

Sainthood
- Feast day: 13 August
- Venerated in: Roman Catholic Church
- Beatified: 24 November 1996; Saint Peter's Basilica, Vatican City by Pope John Paul II
- Attributes: Priest's cassock; Palm
- Patronage: Preachers; Marriage

Otto Neururer (25 March 1882 – 30 May 1940) was an Austrian Roman Catholic priest and was the first priest to die in a Nazi concentration camp. Neururer completed his studies for the priesthood in Brixen before he served as a teacher and pastor in several cities before settling in 1932 in Götzens near Innsbruck. He was arrested in 1938 for attempting to persuade a girl not to be wed to a man of questionable morals and was sent to Dachau before being transferred to Buchenwald where he died after being hanged upside down, nailed to a tree, practically crucified. As he was "crucified" he did not scream, but instead prayed silently. He was left there for 36 hours and then killed by Nazi guard Martin Sommer. Otto Neururer was later beatified.

Neururer's beatification was celebrated on 24 November 1996 based on the fact that he died in odium fidei (as a result of the "hatred of the faith").

== Life ==
Otto Neururer was born on 25 March 1881 as the last of twelve children to the poor and modest farmers Alois Neururer and Hildegard Streng. His parents managed a small farm with a mill. He was a timid (noted as having had a subdued temperament) but academic man who battled depression much like his mother did. His devout mother would suffer from these occasional bouts of depression following her husband's death when Neururer was eight years old.

Supported by his uncle, he studied for the priesthood in Brixen, under the Vincentians from 1895, (he did his theological studies from 1903 onwards) before he was ordained to the priesthood in June 1907. He celebrated his first Mass as a priest in his hometown. Neururer also wanted to become a Jesuit so he could join their missions though his delicate health at the time prevented him from being able to pursue that path. He served as a curate and as a teacher of religious education in the Saint James parish from 1917 until 1932 following his ordination and later joined the Christian Social Movement (in the spirit of the papal document Rerum Novarum) despite the fact that it put him at odds with his conservative superiors. His first assignment as a priest was spent in Urdens in Zillertal and then in Oberinntal before being sent to Kappl in Paznautal. He was then sent to Innsbruck and then in 1932 was sent to his final assignment as a pastor in Götzens near Innsbruck to the Saints Peter and Paul parish church.

The Nazi annexation of Austria in 1938 led to the arrest of several priests. Neururer was serving as a parish priest in Götzens at the time that this was taking place. He advised a girl not to marry a divorced man (known for having lived a dissolute life) owing to his questionable morals, but it happened that this man was a personal friend of Franz Hofer (the Nazi Gauleiter of Tirol). The girl refused to listen to the priest's advice and told this man, who in turn reported Neururer to the authorities. Neururer was arrested on 15 December 1938 as a result of his actions on the charge of "slander to the detriment of German marriage" and sent on 3 March 1939 to the Dachau Concentration Camp before later being sent on 26 September 1939 to Buchenwald where he faced frequent torture. In prison he shared his scarce food rations with prisoners in a weaker condition.

Neururer, despite suspecting a trap, agreed to perform a forbidden baptism at the camp for a prisoner who approached him in April 1940 and was sent to the punishment block when his action was discovered not long after. There he was hanged upside down and naked until he died after 34 hours of agony. It was said that this execution was conducted on the orders of the sadistic SS Hauptscharführer (master sergeant) Martin Sommer – the "Hangman of Buchenwald". The chaplain Alfred Berchtold (1904-85) witnessed Neururer's final torture and said that he never complained but would mumble while he was still conscious. His remains were cremated on 3 June 1940 (the Nazis later attributed his death to "acute cardiac weakness") and his ashes sent in an urn to Götzens later that same month and where they are now located under the altar of the Götzens parish church.

== Beatification ==
The beatification process opened on 23 May 1983 after the Congregation for the Causes of Saints issued the official edict "nihil obstat" (no objections to the cause) and titled Neururer as a Servant of God; the diocesan process was conducted in Innsbruck from 20 November 1983 until 8 December 1986. It was following this investigation that the documentation was sent to the C.C.S. in Rome where on 14 June 1991 the C.C.S. validated the diocesan process as having complied with their regulations and therefore deeming that process to have been valid. The official Positio dossier was sent to the C.C.S. sometime after so that the cause could be investigated further. Theologians first assented to the cause on 19 May 1995 as did the cardinal and bishop members of the C.C.S. on 21 November 1995.

Neururer was cleared for beatification on 12 January 1996 after Pope John Paul II confirmed that the priest had died "in odium fidei" (in hatred of the faith). John Paul II beatified Neururer on 24 November 1996 in Saint Peter's Basilica.

== See also ==
- Catholic Church and Nazi Germany
- Priest Barracks of Dachau
