= German casualties in World War II =

Casualties of German citizens during World War II

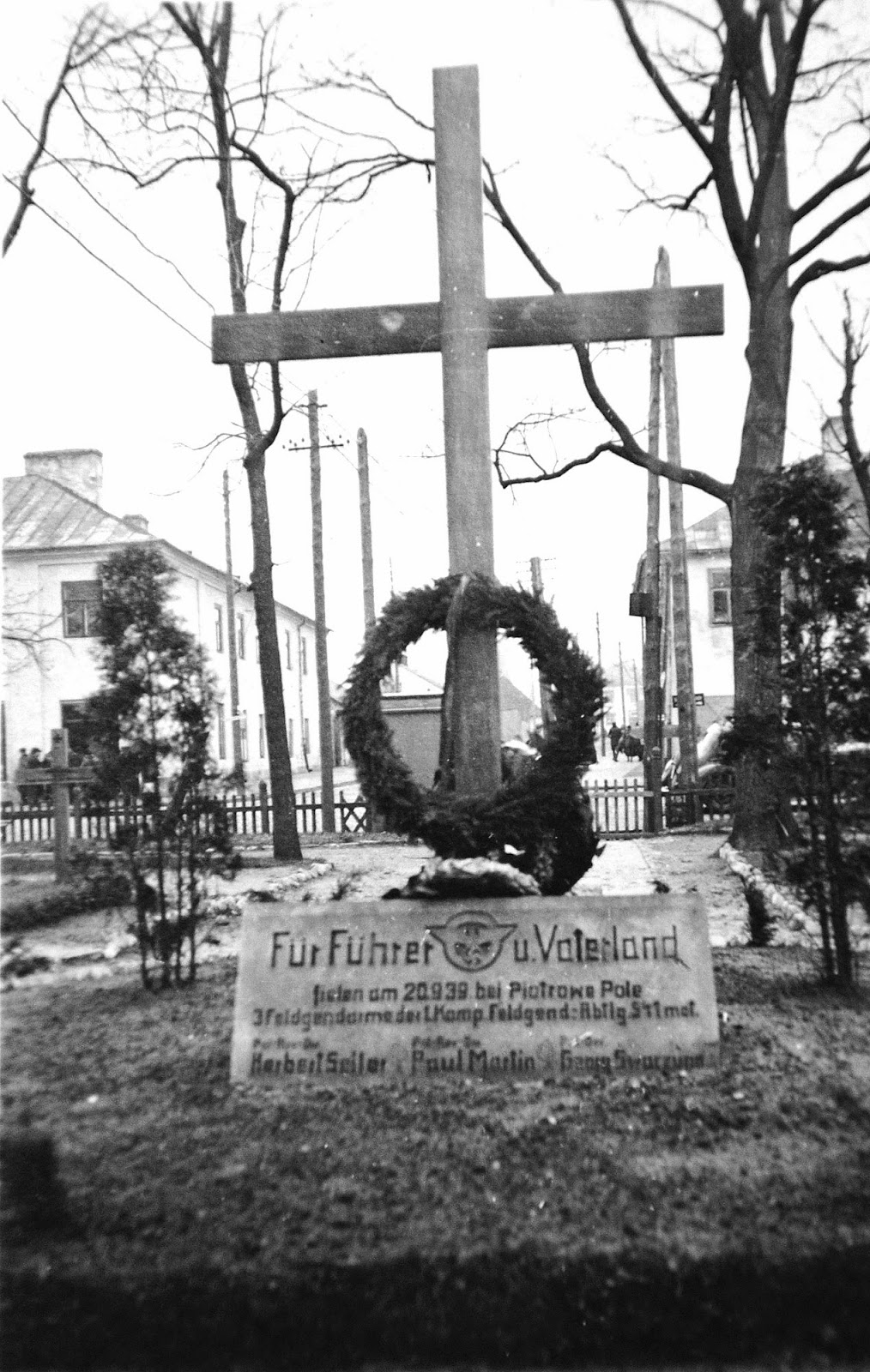
Grave of German soldiers fallen during the invasion of Poland in the town of Końskie

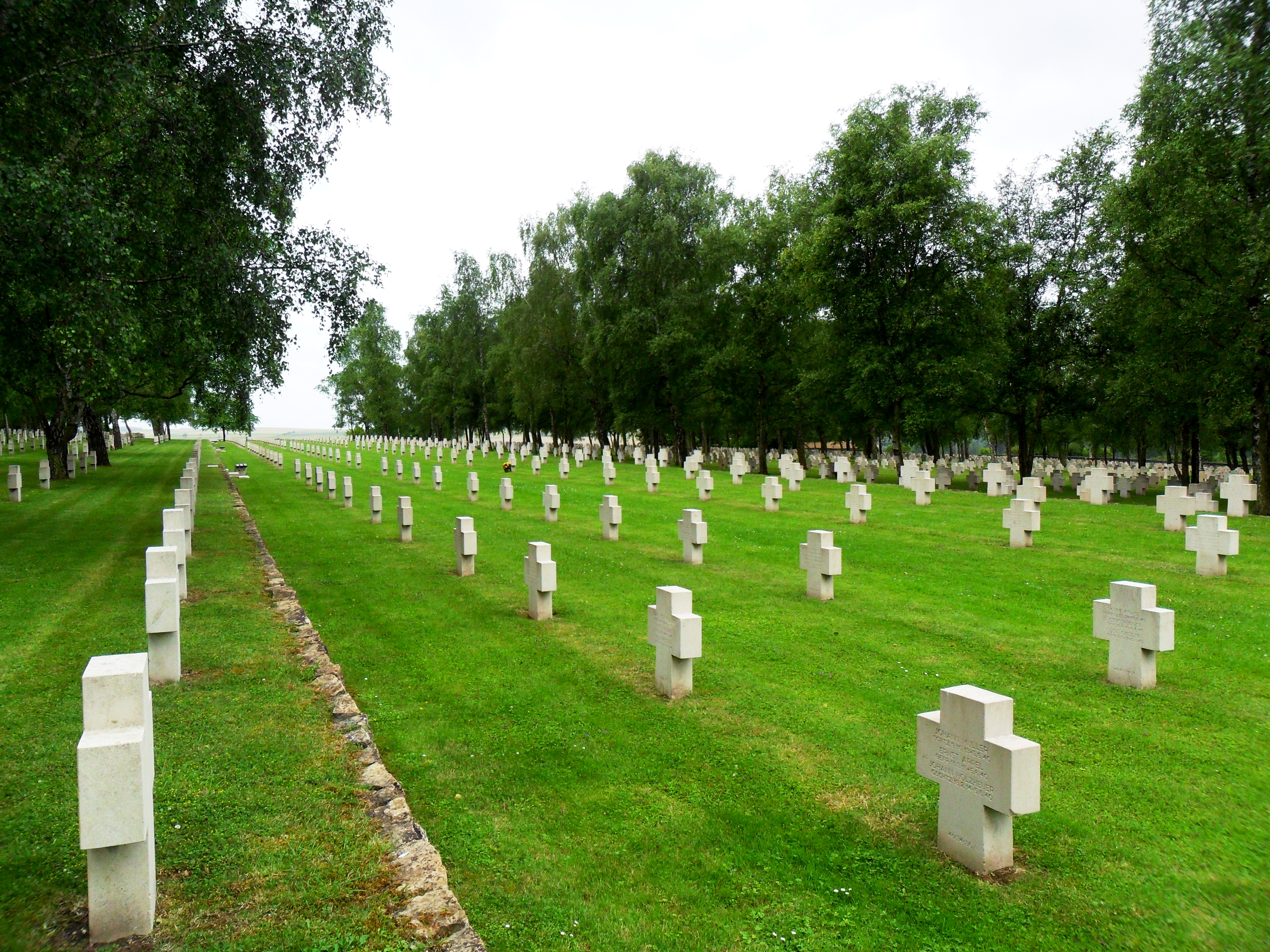
German War Cemetery in France

Statistics for German World War II military casualties are divergent. The wartime military casualty figures compiled by the Oberkommando der Wehrmacht (the German High Command, abbreviated as OKW) through 31 January 1945 are often cited by military historians in accounts of individual campaigns in the war. A study by German historian Rüdiger Overmans concluded that total German military deaths were much higher than those originally reported by the German High Command, amounting to 5.3 million, including 900,000 men conscripted from outside Germany's 1937 borders, in Austria and in east-central Europe. The German government reported that its records list 4.3 million dead and missing military personnel.

Air raids were a major cause of civilian deaths. Estimates of German civilians killed just by Allied strategic bombing alone have ranged from around 350,000 to 500,000. (Note: The figure of 500,000 includes 436,000 civilians, 39,000 foreign workers and prisoners of war and 25,000 police and military personnel.) (Note: According to the report "no complete and accurate figures on German civilian air raid casualties, covering the entire period of the war, are available". The authors maintain that the German figures for 1940 through 1943 of 111,000 killed was generally correct and that their estimate of 311,000 dead for the years 1944 and 1945 was based on the tons of bombs dropped and the population size of the cities bombed. Regarding overall losses they concluded that "It was further estimated that an additional number, approximately 25% of known deaths in 1944 and 1945, were still unrecovered and unrecorded. With an addition of this estimate of 1944 and 1945 unrecorded deaths, the final estimation gave in round numbers a half a million German civilians killed by Allied aerial attacks".) Estimates of civilian deaths due to the flight and expulsion of Germans, Soviet war crimes and the forced labor of Germans in the Soviet Union are disputed and range from 500,000 to over 2.0 million. According to the German government Suchdienste (lit. 'search service') there were 300,000 German victims (including Jews) of Nazi racial, political and religious persecution. This statistic does not include 200,000 German people with disabilities who were murdered in the Action T4 and Action 14f13 euthanasia programs.

== German sources for military casualties ==
=== Records of German military search service ===
In the post-war era the military search service Deutsche Dienststelle (WASt) was responsible for providing information to the families of those military personnel who were killed or went missing in the war. They maintained the files of over 18 million men who served in the war. By the end of 1954, they had identified approximately 4 million military dead and missing (2,730,000 dead and 1,240,629 missing). After German reunification, the records kept in the former German Democratic Republic (East Germany) became available to the WASt. The German Red Cross reported in 2005 that the records of the WASt showed total Wehrmacht losses to have been 4.3 million men (3.1 million dead and 1.2 million missing) in World War II. Their figures include men conscripted from Austria and conscripted ethnic Germans from lands in Eastern Europe. The German historian Rüdiger Overmans used the files of the WASt to conduct his research on German military casualties.

=== Wartime statistics compiled by German High Command (OKW) ===
The German military system for reporting casualties was based on a numerical reporting of casualties by individual units and a separate listing of the names of individual casualties. The system was not uniform because the various military branches (Army, Air Force, Navy, and Waffen SS) and the military hospitals used different reporting systems. In early 1945 the High Command (OKW) prepared a summary of total losses through January 31, 1945. The German historian Rüdiger Overmans believes, based on his research, that these figures are far from complete. According to Overmans, the casualty reporting system broke down in the chaos at the end of the war; many men who went missing or were taken prisoner were not included in the OKW figures, and many individual reports of casualties were not processed by the end of the war and were not reflected in the OKW statistics. The following schedules summarize the OKW figures published in the post-war era.

==== Reported in the press in 1945 ====
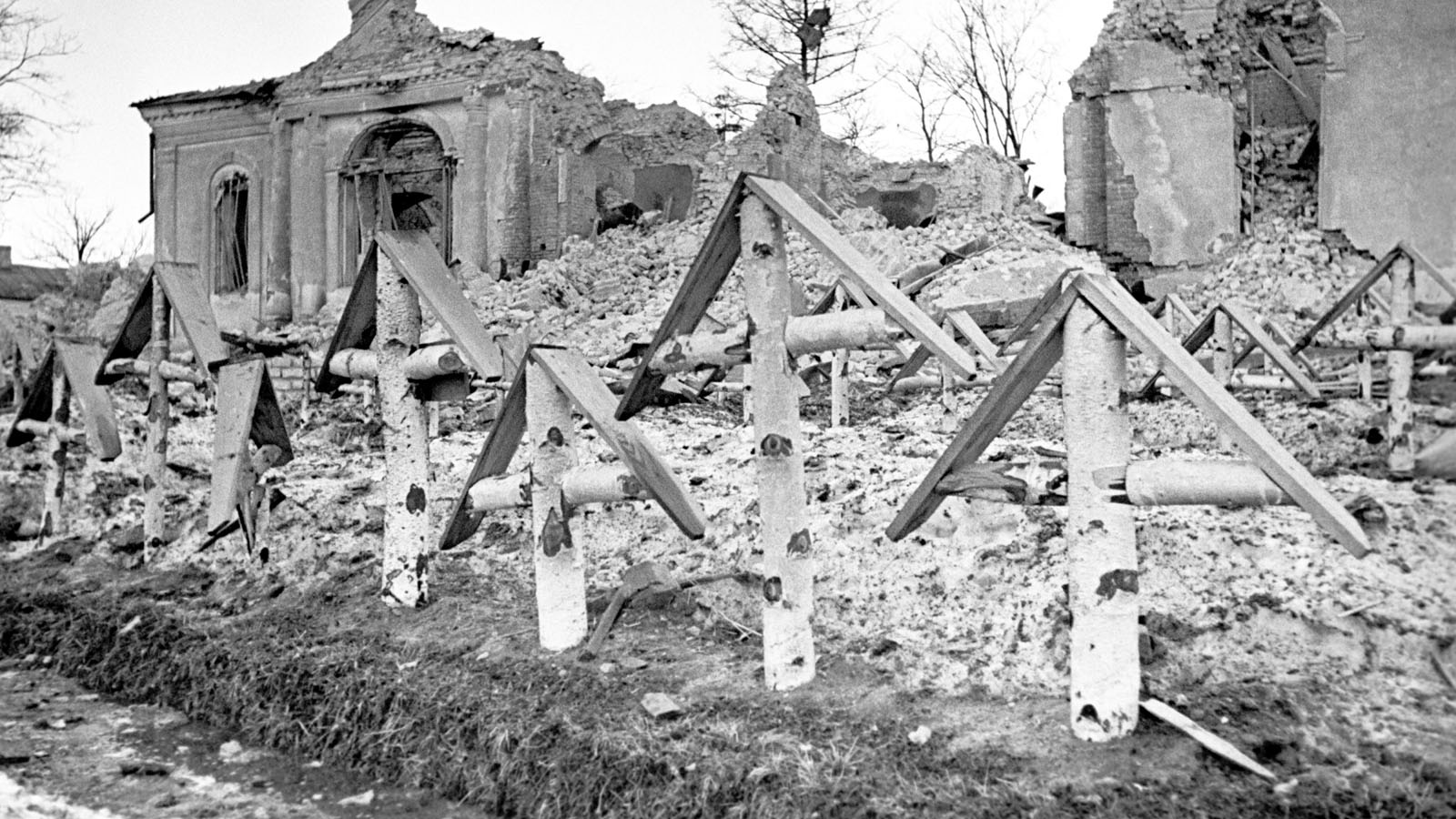
Graves of German soldiers in Maloarkhangelsk, February 1943

According to a report published by the Reuters News Agency, on July 29 1945 highly confidential archives found at Flensburg, in the house of General Hermann Reinecke showed German losses up to November 30, 1944, as 3.6 million, detailed in the following schedule.

	Army	Navy	Air Force	Total
Killed	1,710,000	52,000	150,000	1,912,000
Missing	1,541,000	32,000	141,000	1,714,000
Total	3,251,000	84,000	291,000	3,626,000

Source of figures:

==== OKW war diary ====
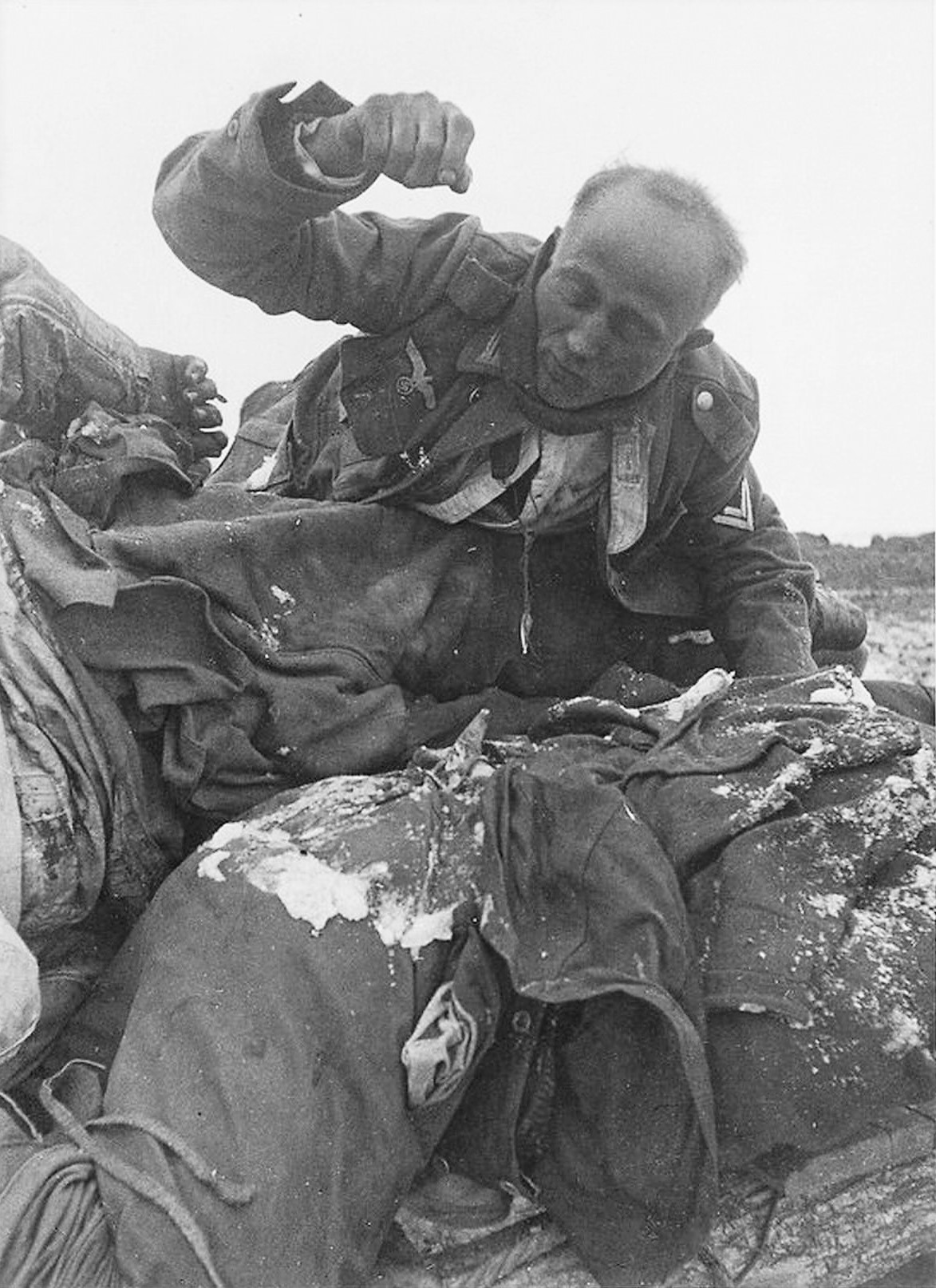
The corpse of a German soldier at a collection point after the Battle of Stalingrad, February 1943

Percy Ernst Schramm was responsible for maintaining the official OKW diary during the war. In 1949 he published an article in the newspaper Die Zeit, in which he listed OKW Casualty Figures these figures also appeared in a multi-volume edition of the OKW diaries.

OKW casualty figures (September 1, 1939 – January 31, 1945)

Description	Dead	Missing & POW	Total	Wounded & Sick
Army				
Eastern Front	1,105,987	1,018,365	2,124,352	3,498,059
North: Norway/Finland	16,639	5,157	21,796	60,451
Southwest: N Africa/Italy	50,481	194,250	244,731	163,602
Southeast: Balkans	19,235	14,805	34,040	55,069
West: France/Low Countries	107,042	409,715	516,757	399,856
Training Forces	10,467	1,337	11,804	42,174
Died of Wounds-All Fronts	295,659	-	295,659	-
Location not Given	17,051	2,687	19,738	-
Subtotal (Army)	1,622,561	1,646,316	3,268,877	4,188,037
Navy	48,904	100,256	149,160	25,259
Air Force	138,596	156,132	294,728	216,579
Total Combat: All Branches	1,810,061	1,902,704	3,712,765	4,429,875
Other deaths (Disease, accidents, etc.)	191,338	-	191,338	-
Overall total	2,001,399	1,902,704	3,904,103	4,429,875

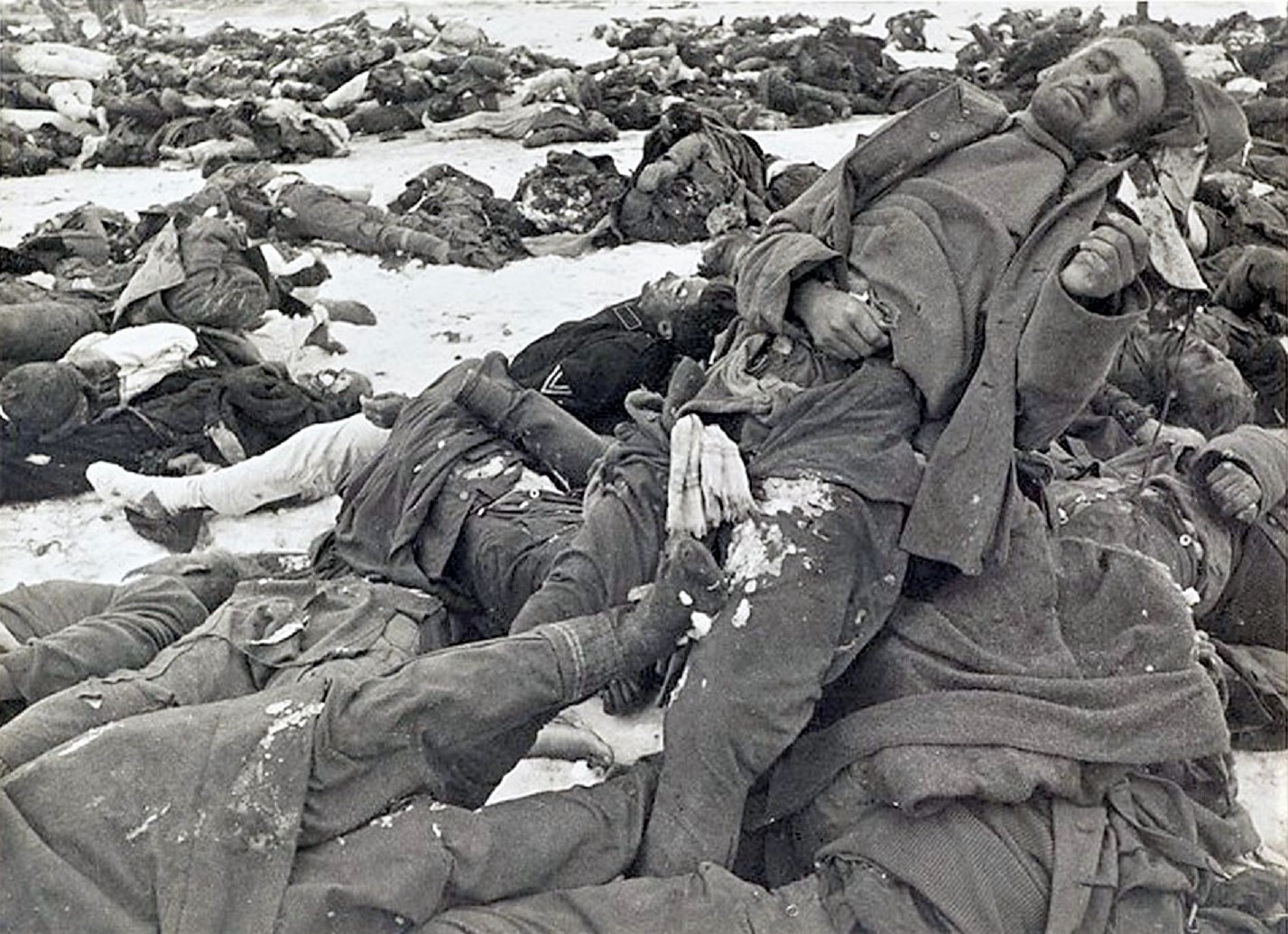
Corpses of German soldiers at a collection point after the Battle of Stalingrad, February 1943

Source of Figures: Percy Schramm Kriegstagebuch des Oberkommandos der Wehrmacht: 1940—1945: 8 Bde. 1961 (ISBN 9783881990738) Pages 1508–1511

Notes:

1-These statistics include losses of the Waffen SS as well as Volkssturm and paramilitary serving with the regular forces.

2-These statistics include casualties of the volunteer forces from the Soviet Union. 83,307 dead; 57,258 missing and 118,127 wounded.

3-Included in these statistics are 322,807 POWs held by the US and UK.

4-The figures for Army wounded add up to 4,219,211. Schramm put the total at 4,188,057.

5-Figures of missing include POWs held by Allies.

==== West German government Statistisches Jahrbuch (Statistical Yearbook). ====
A. OKW figures from 9/1/1939 to 12/31/1944

Description	Dead	Missing and prisoners of war	Total	Wounded
Army and Waffen SS	1,750,000	1,610,000	3,360,000	5,026,000
Navy	60,000	100,000	160,000	21,000
Air Force	155,000	148,000	303,000	193,000
Total Wehrmacht	1,965,000	1,858,000	3,823,000	5,240,000

B. Monthly Field Army (Feldheer) casualties September 1939 to November 1944

Year	Casualties	January	February	March	April	May	June	July	August	September	October	November	December
1939	Dead	-	-	-	-	-	-	-	-	16,400	1,800	1,000	900
1939	Missing	-	-	-	-	-	-	-	-	400	-	-	-
1940	Dead	800	700	1,100	2,600	21,600	26,600	2,200	1,800	1,600	1,300	1,200	1,200
1940	Missing	-	100	-	400	900	100	-	-	100	100	100	-
1941	Dead	1,400	1,300	1,600	3,600	2,800	22,000	51,000	52,800	45,300	42,400	28,200	39,000
1941	Missing	100	100	100	600	500	900	3,200	3,500	2,100	1,900	4,300	10,500
1942	Dead	44,400	44,500	44,900	25,600	29,600	31,500	36,000	54,100	44,300	25,500	24,900	38,000
1942	Missing	10,100	4,100	3,600	1,500	3,600	2,100	3,700	7,300	3,400	2,600	12,100	40,500
1943	Dead	37,000	42,000	38,100	15,300	16,200	13,400	57,800	58,000	48,800	47,000	40,200	35,300
1943	Missing	127,600	15,500	5,200	3,500	74,500	1,300	18,300	26,400	21,900	16,800	17,900	14,700
1944	Dead	44,500	41,200	44,600	34,000	24,400	26,000	59,000	64,000	42,400	46,000	31,900	-
1944	Missing	22,000	19,500	27,600	13,000	22,000	32,000	310,000	407,600	67,200	79,200	69,500	-

Notes: Figures include Waffen SS, Austrians and conscripted ethnic Germans. Figures for missing include POW held by Allies. Source:

==== Das Heer 1933–1945 by Burkhart Müller-Hillebrand ====
In 1969, the West German military historian Burkhart Müller-Hillebrand (de) published the third volume of his study of the German Army in World War II Das Heer 1933–1945 that listed OKW casualty figures and his estimate of total German casualties. Müller-Hillebrand maintained that the OKW figures did not present an accurate accounting of German casualties because they understated losses in the final months of the war on the eastern front and post war deaths of POW in Soviet captivity. According to Müller-Hillebrand actual irrecoverable losses in the war were between 3.3 and 4.5 million men. Overall Müller-Hillebrand estimated the total dead and missing at 4.0 million men.

A. Losses Reported by OKW September 1 1939 – April 30 1945 (For all branches of service)

Period	Dead from all causes	MIA and Prisoners of War	Total
Actual:Sept 1, 1939- Dec 31,1944	1,965,324	1,858,404	3,823,728
Estimated: Jan 1, 1945 - April 30, 1945	265,000	1,012,000	1,277,000
Total	2,230,324	2,870,404	5,100,728

The figure of 1,277,000 killed and missing from January 1 1945 - April 30 1945 was estimated by the U.S. Army in the 1947 report German Manpower

B. Field Army (Feldheer) casualties September 1939 to November 1944

Year	Dead	Missing
1939/40	76,848	2,038
1940/41	140,378	8,769
1941/42	455,635	58,049
1942/43	413,009	330,904
1943/44	502,534	925,088
1944 until Nov 30.	121,335	215,981
Total	1,709,739	1,540,829

C. Field Army (Feldheer) casualties September 1939 to November 1944

Campaign	Dead	Missing
Poland 1939	16,343	320
Norway 1940	4,975	691
West until May 31, 1944	66,266	3,218
West June 1944-November 30, 1944	54,754	338,933
Africa 1940 - May 1943	12,808	90,052
Balkans 1941 - November 30, 1944	24,267	12,060
Italy May 1943 - November 30, 1944	47,873	97,154
Russia June 1941-November 30, 1944	1,419,728	997,056
Home front 1939-November 30, 1944	64,055	1,315

=== Strength by service branch ===
Strength by Service Branch
Branch	May 1941	Middle 1944
Army(Heer)	3,800,000	4,400,000
Home Army(Ersatzheer)	1,200,000	2,500,000
Air Force (including infantry units)	1,680,000	2,100,000
Navy	404,000	800,000
Waffen SS	150,000	550,000
Total	7,234,000	10,300,000

=== Statistical study by Rüdiger Overmans ===
The German historian Rüdiger Overmans in 2000 published the study Deutsche militärische Verluste im Zweiten Weltkrieg (German Military Casualties in the Second World War), which has provided a reassessment of German military war dead based on a statistical survey of German military personnel records. The financial support for the study came from a private foundation. When Overmans conducted his research project during 1992 to 1994 he was an officer in the German Armed Forces. Overmans was an associate of the German Armed Forces Military History Research Office from 1987 until 2004 and was on the faculty of the University of Freiburg from 1996 to 2001. In 1992 when Overmans began the project, German military dead in the war listed at the military search service Deutsche Dienststelle (WASt) were 4.3 million men (3.1 million confirmed dead and 1.2 missing and presumed dead). Since the collapse of communism previously classified documentation regarding German military casualties became available to German researchers.

The research project involved taking a statistical sample of the confidential German military personnel records located at the (WASt). The project sought to determine total deaths and their cause, when and in which theatre of war the losses occurred as well as a demographic profile of the men who served in the war. Nineteen employees at Deutsche Dienststelle assisted in the survey. The personnel records included 3,070,000 men who were confirmed dead in the Death Files and another 15,200,000 men in the General Files who had served in the war including those listed as missing and presumed dead. The total sample pulled for the research consisted of the files of 4,844 personnel dead or missing in military service during the war: The first group 4,137 from Army, Air Force and 172 from Waffen SS and paramilitary organizations including (3,051 confirmed dead from the Death Files and another 1,258 found to be dead or missing in the General Files) The Second Group of 535 men found to be dead or missing was selected from the separate Navy files. Overmans maintains that based on the size of the sample selected that there was a 99% confidence level that the results were accurate. The research by Overmans concluded in 2000 that the total German military dead and missing were 5,318,000. The results of the Overmans research project were published with the endorsement of the German Armed Forces Military History Research Office of the Federal Ministry of Defense (Germany).

The following schedules give a brief overview of the Overmans study.

By Official Status (per R. Overmans)
Description	Number of Deaths
Confirmed Dead	3,068,000
Declared dead in legal proceedings	1,095,787
Recorded in Records (Registrierfall)	1,154,744
Total Dead	5,318,531

By Official Cause of Death (per R. Overmans)
Cause of Death	Number of dead
Killed in Action	2,303,320
Died of Wounds, Illness etc.	500,165
Suicides	25,000
Sentenced to Death	11,000
No Information	12,000
Subtotal-Dead in Active Service	2,851,485
Missing	1,306,186
Final Report "Letzte Nachricht"	701,385 (Note: Overmans defines Letze Nachricht as "time of last field communication or other sign of life" ("von wann der letzte Feldpost oder ein anders Lebenszeichen stammt").)
Sub-total- Presumed Dead	2,007,571
Confirmed deaths as POW	459,475
Total Dead	5,318,531

Of the 2 million presumed dead, Overmans believes 700,000 died in Soviet custody without being reported as POWs.

By Front (per R. Overmans)
Front	Total Dead
Eastern Front until 12/31/44	2,742,909
Western Front until 12/31/44	339,957
Final Battles in Germany (East & West fronts Jan–May, 1945)	1,230,045
Other (Germany, Naval, Poland etc.)	245,561
Italy (until the surrender in 1945)	150,660
The Balkans (until Oct. 1944)	103,693
Northern Europe (Scandinavia without Finland)	30,165
Africa	16,066
Prisoners of War	459,475
Total	5,318,531

Overmans states that there is not sufficient data to break down the 1,230,045 deaths in the 1945 "final battles" in Germany between the Western Allied invasion of Germany and Eastern Front in 1945, although he estimates that 2/3 of these casualties can be attributed to the Eastern Front. For the entire year 1945 Overmans puts total losses at 1,540,000 (1,230,045 in the final battles; 57,495 in other theaters and 252,188 POW). Overmans 1,230,045 figure for the "final battles" includes (1) killed, (2) missing, (3) otherwise deceased "without prisoners of war", as is differentiated on p. 272. The missing (697,319) does not include confirmed deaths in captivity, however on page 288 Overmans mentions 400,000 missing in the East in 1945 and states that this figure of missing was based on his finding that two thirds of deaths during the "final battles" occurred in the East of Germany. He further argues (p. 289) that about half of the 1,536,000 missing in the East between 1941 and 1945, according to his calculations, may well have died in Soviet captivity. On the other hand, Overmans states that "300,000 soldiers per month" (p. 275), "that is, 10,000 men per day" (p. 279, cf. p. 283, also stated in the introduction) actually died in 1945. Overall, Overmans estimates losses for the entire war on the Eastern front at 4 million and in the West 1 million.

Monthly German military casualties at point of death per Overmans study. (Not including living POWs still held.)

Year	January	February	March	April	May	June	July	August	September	October	November	December	Total
1939	-	-	-	-	-	-	-	-	15,000	3,000	1,000	-	19,000
1940	2,000	-	5,000	3,000	21,000	29,000	7,000	4,000	4,000	5,033	1,000	2,000	83,000
1941	10,000	1,000	4,000	4,000	13,000	29,000	67,132	51,066	53,033	44,099	38,000	42,198	357,000
1942	53,165	52,099	46,132	24,066	44,099	34,033	46,099	74,231	46,033	30,000	38,231	83,792	572,000
1943	185,376	74,363	59,099	21,066	31,099	21,066	79,231	66,198	69,495	61,330	77,396	66,330	812,000
1944	81,330	91,495	112,759	92,363	78,495	182,178	215,013	348,960	151,957	184,089	103,561	159,386	1,802,000
1945	451,742	294,772	284,442	281,848	94,528	20,066	13,000	27,099	22,132	19,000	21,033	10,066	1,540,000
1946	7,000	13,099	14,000	6,000	10,066	3,000	3,000	6,000	5,033	3,000	2,000	4,000	76,000
1947	3,008	2,000	5,033	3,000	1,000	5,033	2,000	5,033	1,000	2,000	3,000	1,000	33,000
After 1947	-	-	-	-	-	-	-	-	-	-	-	-	25,000
Total All Years	-	-	-	-	-	-	-	-	-	-	-	-	5,318,000

Notes: Figures include Waffen SS, Austrians, conscripted ethnic Germans, Volkssturm, and other paramilitary forces. Figures do not include prisoners held by Allies. Prisoners held during the war are listed in a separate schedule below. Monthly figures do not add because of rounding.

Total Missing and Presumed Dead (not including POW) per Overmans
Year of Death	Number	(of which on Soviet-German front)
1941 & before	30,000	(26,000)
1942	116,000	(108,000)
1943	289,000	(283,000)
1944	845,000	(719,000)
1945	728,000	(400,000)
1946 & later	0	0
Total	2,007,000	(1,536,000)

German military dead on the Eastern Front (per R. Overmans)
Total During Year	Total Dead
1941	302,000
1942	507,000
1943	701,000
1944	1,233,000
Total 1941–1944	2,742,000

Soviet sources reported that "In 1945 the German Army lost more than 1,000,000 men killed on the Soviet-German front alone."

Figures do not include POW deaths of 363,000 in Soviet captivity; these losses were listed separately by Overmans.

Number conscripted by Service Branch (per R. Overmans)
Branch	Total Dead	Total Conscripted
Army	4,200,000	13,600,000
Air Force (including infantry units)	430,000	2,500,000
Navy	140,000	1,200,000
Waffen SS	310,000	900,000
Total	5,080,000	18,200,000

By Service Branch (per R. Overmans)
Branch	Total dead
Army	4,202,000
Air Force (including infantry units)	433,000
Navy	138,000
Support troops	53,000
Total Wehrmacht	4,826,000
Waffen SS	314,000
Volkssturm	78,000
Police	63,000
Other organizations	37,000
Total	5,318,000

By Nation of Origin (per R. Overmans)	War dead (Wehrmacht & Waffen SS)	Conscripted (Wehrmacht only)
Germany (post war 1945 borders)	3,546,000	11,813,000
Germany (former Eastern Territories) and Danzig)	910,000	2,525,000
Subtotal Germany (1937 borders including Danzig)	4,456,000	14,338,000
Foreign nationals of German ancestry in annexed regions of East and Southeast Europe; Annexed Territories (Polish areas annexed by Nazi Germany, Sudetenland, Eupen-Malmedy & Memel)	206,000	588,000
Austria	261,000	1,306,000
Subtotal Greater German Reich	4,932,000	16,232,000
Foreign nationals of German ancestry from East and Southeast Europe (Poland, Hungary, Romania, Yugoslavia)	332,000	846,000
French (Alsace-Lorraine)	30,000	136,000
Others (from Western Europe)	33,000	86,000
Total	5,318,000	17,300,000

According to Overmans there are no reliable figures to analyse by national origin the 900,000 men of German ancestry conscripted into the Waffen-SS. Overmans maintains that records of the Deutsche Dienststelle (WASt) surveyed only persons of German ancestry (Deutsche nach Abstammung) However Polish sources maintain that during the war the Germans forcibly conscripted ethnic Poles into the German military. Professor Ryszard Kaczmarek of the University of Silesia in Katowice, author of a monograph titled Polacy w Wehrmachcie ("Poles in the Wehrmacht") noted that many Polish citizens in the Polish areas annexed by Nazi Germany were forcibly conscripted in Upper Silesia and in Pomerania. They were declared citizens of the Third Reich by law and therefore subject to drumhead court-martial in case of draft evasion. A 1958 West German estimate put the military war dead of ethnic German (deutschen Bevölkerung) foreign nationals from east-central Europe in the German Armed Forces at 432,000 (Baltic States 15,000, Poland 108,000, Czechoslovakia 180,000, Hungary 32,000, Yugoslavia 40,000 and Romania 35,000)

Overmans does not include Soviet volunteers in the Wehrmacht in his figures, only persons of German ancestry (Deutsche nach Abstammung). According to Overmans there is no reliable data on losses of Soviet volunteers. Russian military historian G. I. Krivosheev estimated losses in the Wehrmacht of volunteer formations and SS troops (Vlasovites, Balts, Muslims etc.) at 215,000. The statistics of the German High Command put casualties of the volunteer forces from the Soviet Union up until 1/31/1945 at: 83,307 dead; 57,258 missing and 118,127 wounded

=== Comparison of figures at 31 December 1944 per Overmans and German High Command ===
Overmans maintains that his research project taking a statistical sample of the records of the Deutsche Dienststelle (WASt) found that the German military casualty reporting system broke down during the war and that losses were understated. The following schedule compares the total dead and living POW according to Overmans at 31 December 1944 with the figures of the German High Command (OKW).

Description	Numbers
Total dead per Overmans at 31 December 1944	3,643,000
Add: POWs held by Allies per Overmans	1,283,000
Add: Estimated losses of Soviet volunteers	140,000
Adjusted losses at 31 December 1944	5,066,000
Total dead & missing at 31 December 1944 per OKW	3,823,000
Difference	1,243,000

=== German prisoners of war ===
See also: German prisoners of war in northwest Europe, German prisoners of war in the Soviet Union and German prisoners of war in the United States

The fates of German prisoners of war have been a concern in post war Germany. By 1950 the Soviets reported that they had repatriated all German prisoners of war except a small number of convicted war criminals. During the cold war in West Germany there were claims that one million German prisoners of war were held in secret by the USSR. The West German government set up the Maschke Commission to investigate the fate of German POW in the war; in its report of 1974 the Maschke Commission found that about 1.2 million German military personnel reported as missing more than likely died as POWs, including 1.1 million in the USSR. Based on his research, Rüdiger Overmans believes that the deaths of 459,000 dead POWs can be confirmed in the files of Deutsche Dienststelle (WASt) [including 363,000 in the USSR]. Overmans estimates the actual death toll of German POWs is about 1.1 million men (including 1.0 million in the USSR); he maintains that among those reported as missing were men who actually died as prisoners. Data from the Soviet Archives published by G. I. Krivosheev put the deaths in the USSR of German POWs at 450,600 including 356,700 in NKVD camps and 93,900 in transit. After the collapse of communism, data from the Soviet Archives became available concerning the deaths of German POWs in the USSR. In recent years there has been a joint Russian-German project to investigate the fate of POWs in the war.

According to the records of the western Allies, 2.8 million German soldiers surrendered on the Western Front between D-day and the end of April 1945; 1.3 million between D-day and March 31, 1945 and 1.5 million in April. (Note: 2,055,575 German soldiers surrendered between D-day and April 16, 1945, The Times, April 19 p 4; 755,573 German soldiers surrendered between April 1 and 16, The Times, April 18 p 4, which means that 1,300,002 German soldiers surrendered to the Western Allies between D-day and the end of March 1945.) From early March these surrenders seriously weakened the Wehrmacht in the West, and made further surrenders more likely, thus having a snowballing effect. On March 27 Eisenhower declared at a press conference that the enemy were a whipped army. In March the daily rate of POWs taken on the Western Front was 10,000; in the first 14 days of April it rose to 39,000 and in the last 16 days the average peaked at 59,000 soldiers captured each day. (Note: "In the first fourteen days of April 548,173 German prisoners were taken".) (Note: In the last sixteen days of April, (over) 951,827 Germans were captured to make a total of (over) 1,500,000 for the whole of April, see Ref. 2) The number of prisoners taken in the west in March and April was over 1,800,000, (Note: The number of prisoners taken in March was approaching 350,000, SHAEF Weekly Summary No. 54 w.e.April 1st. PART I LAND Section A, ENEMY OPERATIONS. Thus the total for March and April was well over 1,800,000. (over 300,000 plus 1,500,000.)) more than double the 800,000 German soldiers who surrendered to the Russians in the last three or four months of the war. One reason for this huge difference, possibly the most important, was that German forces facing the Red Army tended to fight to the end for fear of Soviet captivity whereas German forces facing the Western Allies tended to surrender without putting up much if any resistance. The number of German killed and wounded was much higher in the East than in the West. (Note: Indicative of the huge discrepancy are the Heeresarzt 10-Day Casualty Reports per Theater of War, 1945 [BA/MA RH 2/1355, 2/2623, RW 6/557, 6/559]. While certainly incomplete (especially for the period 11–20.4.1945), they reflect the ratio between casualties in both theaters in the final months of the war. For the period 1.3.1945–20.4.1945 they recorded 343,321 killed and wounded in the East (62,861 killed, 280,460 wounded) vs. 22,598 killed and wounded in the West (5,778 killed, 16,820 wounded), an East vs. West ratio of about 15:1 in killed and wounded. The largest difference was in the period from 1–10.4.1945, for which the Heeresarzt recorded 63,386 killed and wounded in the East (12,510 killed, 50,876 wounded) vs. only 431 in the West (100 killed, 331 wounded), an East vs. West ratio of about 147:1 in killed and wounded.) (Note: The Wehrmacht Monthly Casualty Reports, 1945 [BA/MA RM 7/810] show figures for the period from 1.9.1939 to 31.1.1945, which add up to 1,793,010 dead (thereof 1,497,351 killed in action - KIA, broken down by theaters, and 295,659 died of wounds - DOW, not broken down), 4,401,049 wounded in action or sick (WIA) and 1,901,940 missing in action (MIA), for a total of 8,095,999 casualties (7,800,340 without DOW). The MIA figure includes, in unknown relative proportions, servicemen killed in action and prisoners of war. The sum of KIA and MIA is 3,399,291, the sum of KIA and DoW is 5,898,400. Adding up the figures of the three branches of services for Osten (East) yields 1,164,755 KIA (77.79% of the total of 1,497,351), 3,621,568 WIA (82.29% of the total of 4,401,049) and 1,071,415 MIA (56.33% of the total of 1,901,940), the sum of the three categories being 5,857,738 (75.10% of the total of 7,800,340). Of the 3,399,291 KIA+MIA, 2,236,170 (65.78%) correspond to the East, whereas of the 5,898,400 KIA+WIA 4,786,323 (81.15%) occurred in the East.) The Western Allies also took 134,000 German soldiers prisoner in North Africa and at least 220,000 by the end of April 1945 in the Italian campaign. The total haul of German POWs held by the Western Allies by April 30, 1945, in all theatres of war was over 3,150,000, rising in NW Europe to 7,614,790 after the end of the war.

It is worth noting that the Allied armies, which captured the 2.8 million German soldiers up to April 30, 1945, while Adolf Hitler was still alive and resisting as hard as he could, comprised at their peak 88 divisions, with a peak strength in May 1945 of 2,639,377 in the US and 1,095,744 in the British and Canadian forces. The casualties suffered by the Western Allies in making this contribution to the defeat of the Wehrmacht were relatively light, 164,590–195,576 killed/missing, 537,590 wounded and 78,680 taken prisoner, a loss of 780,860 to 811,846 to inflict a loss of 2.8 million prisoners on the German army. The number of dead and wounded on both sides was about equal. (Note: 263,000 Germans killed. According to MacDonald, "exclusive of prisoners of war, all German casualties in the west from D-day to V–E Day probably equaled or slightly exceeded Allied losses". In the related footnote on the same page MacDonald writes the following: "The only specific figures available are from OB WEST for the period 2 June 1941 – 10 April 1945 as follows: dead, 80,819; wounded, 265,526; missing, 490,624; total, 836,969. (Of the total, 4,548 casualties were incurred prior to D-day.) See Rpts, Der Heeresarzt im Oberkommando des Heeres Gen St d H/Gen Qu, Az.: 1335 c/d (IIb) Nr.: H.A./263/45 g. Kdos. of 14 Apr 45 and 1335 c/d (Ilb) (no date, but before 1945). The former is in OCMH X 313, a photostat of a document contained in German armament folder H 17/207; the latter in folder 0KW/1561 (OKW Wehrmacht Verluste). These figures are for the field army only, and do not include the Luftwaffe and Waffen-SS. Since the Germans seldom remained in control of the battlefield in a position to verify the status of those missing, a considerable percentage of the missing probably were killed. Time lag in reporting probably precludes these figures' reflecting the heavy losses during the Allied drive to the Rhine in March, and the cut-off date precludes inclusion of the losses in the Ruhr Pocket and in other stages of the fight in central Germany.")

German POW deaths- Overmans estimate 2000 (all figures approximate)
Nation holding Prisoners of War	Number captured	Deaths
UK	3,600,000	2,000
USA	3,000,000	5–10,000
USSR	3,000,000	max. 1,000,000
France	1,000,000	more than 22,000
Yugoslavia	200,000	80,000
Poland	70,000	10,000
Belgium	60,000	500
Czechoslovakia	25,000	2,000
Netherlands	7,000	200
Luxembourg	5,000	15
Total	11,000,000	1,100,000

Source of figures: or

Confirmed POW deaths
Nation holding POW	Total deaths
USSR	363,000
France	34,000
USA	22,000
UK	21,000
Yugoslavia	11,000
Other nations	8,000
Total	459,000

Source of figures:

German POWs held in captivity (Per R. Overmans)
Average during quarter	Held by Western Allies	Held by Soviets & their Allies	Total living POWs
4th Quarter 1941	6,600	26,000	32,600
4th Quarter 1942	22,300	100,000	122,300
4th Quarter 1943	200,000	155,000	355,000
4th Quarter 1944	720,000	563,000	1,283,000
1st Quarter 1945	920,000	1,103,000	2,023,000
2nd Quarter 1945	5,440,000	2,130,000	7,570,000
3rd Quarter 1945	6,672,000	2,163,000	8,835,000

Overmans has made the following points in Deutsche militärische Verluste im Zweiten Weltkrieg:

- Based on his research Overmans believes that the total of 459,000 dead POWs listed in the files of Deutsche Dienststelle (WASt) is understated. He maintains that included with the 2 million reported as missing and presumed dead (see above schedule – Total Missing and Presumed Dead) were those in fact dead in custody as POWs. He points out that this will not increase the number of German war dead because some of those reported missing would be reclassified as dead POWs. He believes further research is needed on the fate of the POWs.
- He believes that in addition to the 363,000 confirmed POW dead in the USSR, it seems entirely plausible, while not provable, that 700,000 German military personnel listed with the missing actually died in Soviet custody
- He believes that personnel captured on the battlefield may have died of wounds or in transit before being recorded as POW. He pointed out that this was the case of some Germans in American and British hospitals.
- He maintains "Otherwise viewing the case of France, where the figures of the Maschke Commission are based on official French data; an important point to presume, that from the 180,000 missing on the Western front, many were dead in fact in French custody, or soldiers in Indochina.
- He pointed out that the heavy death toll estimated by the Maschke Commission of 80,000 German POW in Yugoslavia was based on documented eyewitness accounts.

==== Russian sources ====
The Russian military historian G. I. Krivosheev has published figures for the casualties on all fronts compiled by the German High Command up until April 30 1945 based on captured German records in the Soviet Archives.

Period	Killed or Died of Wounds	MIA and Prisoners of War	Total	Wounded
Sept 1, 1939- Dec 31,1944	1,965,300	1,858,500	3,823,800	5,240,000
Jan 1, 1945 - April 30, 1945	265,000	1,012,000	1,277,000	795,000
Total	2,230,300	2,870,500	5,100,800	6,035,000

Krivosheev gave a separate set of statistics that put losses at 2,230,000 Killed; 2,400,000 missing and 5,240,000 wounded. According to Krivosheev "The figures in the Wehrmacht documents relating to Germany's war losses are therefore contradictory and unreliable." Based on Soviet sources Krivosheev put German losses on the Eastern Front from 1941 to 1945 at 6,923,700 men: including – killed 4,137,100, taken prisoner 2,571,600 and 215,000 dead among Soviet volunteers in the Wehrmacht. Deaths of POW were 450,600 including 356,700 in NKVD camps and 93,900 in transit. Soviet sources claimed that "In 1945 the German Army lost more than 1,000,000 men killed on the Soviet-German front alone."

== German casualties in English language sources ==
Estimated figures for German World War II casualties are divergent and contradictory. The authors of the Oxford Companion to World War II maintain that casualty statistics are notoriously unreliable The following is a list of published statistics for German casualties in World War II.

- Encyclopædia Britannica, article World Wars (2010) Military-killed, died of wounds or in prison – 3,500,000; wounded – 5,000,000; prisoners or missing – 3,400,000; civilian deaths due to war – 780,000. Estimated total deaths – 4,200,000. (Military deaths include men conscripted outside of Germany, in addition perhaps 250,000 died of natural causes, suicide or were executed. Civilian deaths do not include Austria or 2,384,000 deaths in the Flight and expulsion of Germans (1944–50))
- Oxford Companion to World War II (2005) Military losses – Germany 4,500,000, Austria 230,000 Civilian losses – Germany 2,000,000, Austria 144,000. Total losses for Germany and Austria – 6,874,000.
- World War II Desk Reference (2004) 1,810,061 combat deaths and 1,902,704 missing and presumed dead, total 3,712,865. Civilians killed 3,600,000.
- Encyclopedia of World War Two (2004) Battle deaths 2,049,872; wounded 4,879,875; missing in action 1,902,704. Civilians dead 410,000.
- Warfare and Armed Conflicts – A Statistical Reference (2002) Total military dead all causes 3,250,000 including battle deaths of 2,850,000; wounded 7,250,000. Civilian deaths 593,000 in Anglo-American bombing (including 56,000 foreign workers and 40,000 Austrians), 10,000 killed in the crossfire in the west and 619,000 lost to Soviets and their allies in the east.
- Atlas of the Second World War (1997) Germany-military dead 2,850,000; civilian dead 2,300,000. Austria- military dead 380,000; civilian dead 145,000.
- World War II – A statistical Survey (1993) Military killed and Missing 3,250,000; wounded 4,606,600. Civilians 2,050,000 by Allies and 300,000 by Germans.
- Harper Encyclopedia of Military History (1993) Military- 2,850,000 dead and 7,250,000 wounded. Civilian dead 500,000.
- Alan Bullock (1992)- Military dead 3,250,000 and 3,600,000 to 3,810,000 civilian dead.
- John Keegan (1990) over 4 million military dead; 593,000 civilians died under air attack; possibly 1.0 million civilians died in the flight from the Red Army. An additional 2.1 million civilians perished in the expulsions from Eastern Europe.
- Rudolph Rummel (1990–1997)- According to the calculations of R. J. Rummel the combined German and Austrian death toll due to the war and political killings by governments (Democide) in the World War II era was 10.1 million persons. Rummel's maintains that his figures for war dead exclude political killings by governments. (Note: Rummel lists 169.2 million democide deaths and 34.0 million war dead from 1900 to 1987 for a combined total of 203.2 million.) (Note: Rummel breaks out war dead of 5.2 million for Germany separately from Nazi democide.) The details of Rummel's estimates are as follows.

A. German war dead- 5,200,000 (3,200,000 military and 2,000,000 civilians)
B. Nazi Democide 895,000 (762,000 in Germany and 133,000 in Austria)
C. Soviet Democide- 1,576,000, (469,000 civilians and 1,107,000 German POW)
C. British Democide- 378,000 civilians killed in area bombing of Germany
D. United States Democide- 37,000 (32,000 civilians killed in area bombing of Germany and 5,000 German POW.)
E. French Democide-23,000 German POW.
F. Yugoslav Democide- 145,000 (75,000 ethnic Germans and 70,000 POW)
g. Hungarian Democide-12,000 ethnic Germans
H. Expulsion of the Germans after World War II- 1,863,000 (Poland 1,583,000, Czechoslovakia 197,000 and Yugoslavia 82,000)

- Wars and War-Related Deaths 1700-1987 (1987)- Germany/Austria total deaths 6,626,000 - Germany (military 4,750,000; civilians 1,471,000), Austria (military 280,000; civilians 125,000)
- Melvin Small and J. David Singer (1982) Germany military dead 3,250,000
- Quincy Wright (1965) Germany total deaths 3,750,000 - (military 3,250,000; civilians 500,000)
- English language sources have put the death toll at 2 to 3 million for the flight and expulsion of the Germans. These figures are based on the West German government figures from the 1960s. (Note: 1,863,000 in post war expulsions and an additional 1.0 million in wartime flight.) (Note: 3.1 million including 1.0 million during wartime flight.)

== United States Army figures for German and Italian losses ==
According to the report of General George Marshall issued in 1945 the "breakdown of German and Italian losses against American, British, and French forces" in the war in Europe was as follows:

Campaign	Battle Dead	Permanently Disabled	Captured	Total
Tunisia	19,600	19,000	130,000(A)	168,000
Sicily	5,000	2,000	7,100	14,100
Italy	86,000	15,000	357,089	458,089
Western Front	263,000	49,000	7,614,794 (B)	7,926,794
Total	373,600	85,000	8,108,983	8,567,583

Source of figures: Biennial report of the Chief of Staff of the United States Army to the Secretary of War : July 1, 1943, to June 30, 1945

(A) 252,415 Germans and Italians were captured in Tunisia According to the Imperial War Museum Following the Italian surrender in 1943, 100,000 Italians volunteered to work as 'co-operators'. They were given considerable freedom and mixed with local people. Italian fascist forces fought in the Italian campaign until the end of the war with the Italian Social Republic

(B) Includes 3,404,949 disarmed enemy forces.

The Biennial report of the Chief of Staff of the United States Army issued in 1945 also estimated Japanese "battle dead" at 1.219 million. Marshall's figures of enemy battle deaths are juxtaposed with deaths in the US Army only, suggesting that the losses of Japanese naval forces are not included, nor Japanese casualties in theaters where the Americans were not the main opposing force. Japanese government figures from 2003 put their military war dead at 2.3 million. According to the Japanese Relief Bureau of the Ministry of Health and Welfare in March 1964, a total of 2,121,000 Japanese servicemen perished in WWII. (Note: The breakdown of Japanese military deaths, based on the Relief Bureau's figures, is available on the website of the Australia-Japan Research Project.) Of these 1,647,200 were in the army and 473,800 were in the naval forces. Of the army dead a total of 1,456,500 occurred on the battlefronts that Marshall's figures refer to (Southern Pacific, (Note: This is assumed to include the following regions listed by the Japanese Relief Bureau: Philippines, Malaya & Singapore, Adaman & Nicobar Islands, Sumatra, Java, Lesser Sundas, Borneo, Celebes, Moluccas, New Guinea, Bismarck Archipelago and Solomon Islands. The sum of the Relief Bureau's army dead figures for these regions is 654,800. Marshall's figure for the South Pacific is 684,000.) Central Pacific, (Note: This is assumed to include the following regions listed by the Japanese Relief Bureau: Bonin Islands, Okinawa, Formosa (Taiwan), Islands of Central Pacific. The sum of the Relief Bureau's army dead figures for these regions is 194,900. Marshall's figure for the Central Pacific is 273,000. For the Battle of Okinawa Marshall's figure of Japanese killed is 109,629 (p. 178), versus 67,900 Japanese army dead according to the Relief Bureau.) India-Burma, (Note: The Japanese Relief Bureau's army dead figure for this battlefront is 163,000. Marshall's figure is 128,000.) China (Note: The Japanese Relief Bureau's army dead figure for this battlefront is 435,600. Marshall's figure is 126,000.) and Aleutians. (Note: The Japanese Relief Bureau's army dead figure for Sakhalin & Aleutian Islands is 8,200. Marshall's figure for the Aleutian Islands is 8,000.)) Marshall's figure for China is much lower than that of the Relief Bureau (126,000 vs. 435,600), but for the theaters where Japanese forces confronted American and British Empire forces the sum of Marshall's figures (1,093,000) is slightly higher than the sum of the Relief Bureau's figures for these theaters (1,020,900).

== Demographic estimates of military losses ==
Based on information available in January 1946, the Metropolitan Life Insurance Co. put German military dead at 3,250,000. According to Gregory Frumkin this presumably referred to aggregate German forces including those conscripted outside the 1937 German borders.

In 1951, Gregory Frumkin, who was throughout its existence the editor of the Statistical Year Book of the League of Nations, provided an assessment of German military losses based on a demographic analysis of the European population from 1939 to 1947. Frumkin put total German military dead and missing at 3,975,000: Germany (1937 borders) 3,500,000; Austria 230,000; 200,000 Sudeten Germans from Czechoslovakia; 40,000 from France, 3,700 from the Netherlands; 700 from Norway and 398 from Denmark.

The West German government in November 1949, based on an analysis of the population balance for Germany within its 1937 borders, put German military losses at 3,250,000: 1,650,000 killed and 1,600,000 missing. Figures exclude Austria and conscripted ethnic Germans from Eastern Europe

A demographic analysis of the population balance by the West German government in 1960 put the total military losses of the Wehrmacht at 4,440,000; 3,760,000 for Germany (1937 borders); 430,000 conscripted ethnic Germans from Eastern Europe and 250,000 from Austria.

== Civilian casualties ==
=== Air raid deaths ===
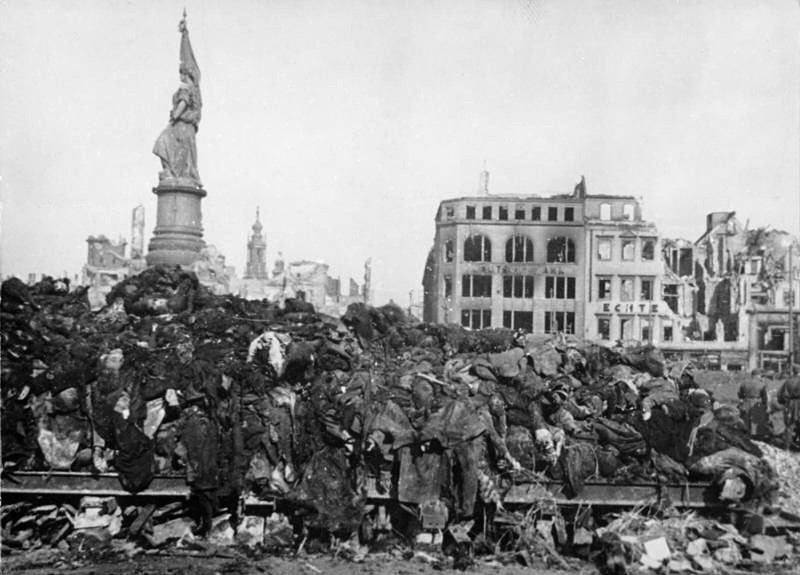
A pile of bodies before cremation after a bombing raid on Dresden, 1945

Official statistics published by the West German government 1956 put the death toll due to air raids at 635,000. However, estimates from other sources tend to be lower, ranging from 305,000 to 500,000 persons killed by Allied bombing of German cities.

==== 1956 West German government report ====
The schedule below details the statistics published by the West German government 1956. They estimated 635,000 total deaths, 500,000 due to the strategic bombing of Germany and an additional 135,000 killed in air raids during the 1945 flight and evacuations on the eastern front. The civilian deaths in the air raids on eastern Front after 1/31/1945 are also included with the figures of the losses during the Flight and expulsion of Germans (1944–50)

Air War Dead 1956 West German government estimate (Germany 1942 borders)
Description	Not including refugees on Eastern Front	Refugees on Eastern Front	Total
Civilians	436,000	134,000	570,000
Foreigners and POW	39,000	-	39,000
Military and Police	25,000	1,000	26,000
Total	500,000	135,000	635,000

- Civilian bombing deaths (not including refugees) of 436,000 include 350,000 dead, 54,000 died of wounds and 32,000 missing and presumed dead.
- Of the 350,000 civilians listed as dead (not including refugees), 126,000 of the deaths occurred after January 31, 1945.
- Included in the total of 635,000 air raid dead were losses for Germany in 1937 borders which totaled 593,000. 465,000 not including refugees (410,000 civilians, 32,000 foreigners and POW and 23,000 military and Police); and losses of 128,000 refugees on eastern front (127,000 civilians and 1,000 military and Police)
- The Austrian government puts their losses in the air war at 24,000. This figure is included in the schedule above.

Sources for figures in schedule: Sperling, Statistisches Bundesamt and Hampe

==== The United States Strategic Bombing Survey ====
The United States Strategic Bombing Survey gave three different figures for German air raid deaths

1-The summary report of September 30, 1945, put total casualties for the entire period of the war at 305,000 killed and 780,000 wounded.

2- The section Effects of Strategic Bombing on the German War Economy of October 31, 1945, put the losses at 375,000 killed and 625,000 wounded.

3-The section The Effect of Bombing on Health and Medical Care in Germany of January 1947 made a preliminary calculated estimate of air raid dead at 422,000. According to the report "no complete and accurate figures on German civilian air raid casualties, covering the entire period of the war, are available". The authors maintain that the German figures for 1940 through 1943 of 111,000 killed was generally correct and that their estimate of 311,000 dead for the years 1944 and 1945 was based on the tons of bombs dropped and the population size of the cities bombed. Regarding overall losses they concluded that "It was further estimated that an additional number, approximately 25% of known deaths in 1944 and 1945, were still unrecovered and unrecorded. With an addition of this estimate of 1944 and 1945 unrecorded deaths, the final estimation gave in round numbers a half a million German civilians killed by Allied aerial attacks."

==== Analysis by Richard Overy ====
Historian Richard Overy in 2014 published a study of the air war The Bombers and the Bombed: Allied Air War Over Europe 1940-1945 in which he disputed the official German figures of air war dead. He estimated total air raid deaths at 353,000. The main points of Overy's analysis are as follows.

- Overy maintains that the German estimates are based on incorrect speculations for losses during the final months of the war when there was a gap in the record keeping system. He points out that the figures for air raid dead in the last three months of the war were estimated in the West German figures at 300,000, which includes the deaths of 135,000 eastern refugees fleeing westward, Overy believes that this is not plausible. The official German figures for the final months of the war include the inflated total of 60,000 deaths from the Bombing of Dresden – Overy notes that the latest research puts the Dresden death toll at approximately 25,000, less than half the West German estimate
- Overy based his analysis on data in German archival sources for the years 1940-1942 and the Civilian Defense Division report of United States Strategic Bombing Survey for the period January 1943 to January 1945. These archival sources indicated a total of 271,188 air raid deaths from the beginning of the war until the end of January 1945. Overy noted that "No doubt this does not include all those who were killed or died of wounds, but it does include uniformed personnel, POWs, and foreign workers, and it applies to the Greater German area". Using the United States Strategic Bombing Survey data Overy calculated an average monthly death toll of 18,777 from September 1944 to January 1945, taking this monthly average he estimated losses of 57,000 from February to April 1945 to which he adds an additional 25,000 killed in Dresden for total deaths of 82,000 from February to April 1945. The figures up until the end of January 1945 of 271,000 and the 82,000 from February to April 1945 give an overall figure of 353,000 air war deaths. Overy summarizes: "Detailed reconstruction of deaths caused by the Royal Air Force bombing from February to May 1945, though incomplete, suggests a total of at least 57,000. If casualties inflicted by the American air forces are assumed to be lower, since their bombing was less clearly aimed at cities, an overall death toll of 82,000 is again statistically realistic. In the absence of unambiguous statistical evidence, the figure of 353,000 gives an approximate scale consistent with the evidence".

==== Other estimates of air raid deaths ====
- A 2005 report by the German Red Cross put the death toll due to strategic bombing at 500,000.
- A 1990 study by the East German historian de:Olaf Groehler estimated 360,000–370,000 civilians were killed by Allied strategic bombing within the 1937 German boundaries, for the German Reich including Austria, forced laborers, POW and military the total is estimated at 406,000. In 2005 Groehler's figures were published in the authoritative series The German Reich and the Second World War
- The estimate by West German government in November 1949 for Germany in 1937 borders was 450,000 killed in bombing and 50,000 in ground fighting. Figures do not include Austria.
- The British PM Clement Attlee in a statement to Parliament on 22 October 1945 put the German death toll in the bombing campaign at 350,000

=== Civilians killed in 1945 military campaign ===
The West German government made a rough estimate in 1956 of 20,000 civilians killed during the 1945 military campaign in current post war German borders, not including the former German territories in Poland. However, there is a more recent estimate of 22,000 civilians killed during the fighting in Berlin only. Not included in these figures are civilians who died in the fighting and atrocities in East-Prussia (Konigsberg, Pillau), Pommerania (Danzig, Kolberg) and Silesia (Breslau). The losses of civilians from East-Central Europe in the 1945 are included with the expulsion dead, the German Archives report of 1974 estimated 150,000 violent deaths of civilians in East-Central Europe during the 1945 military campaign.

=== Deaths due to Nazi political, racial and religious persecution ===
The West German government put the number of Germans killed by the Nazi political, racial and religious persecution at 300,000 (including 160,000 German Jews).

A 2003 report by the German Federal Archive put the total murdered during the Action T4 Euthanasia program at over 200,000 persons. Previously it was reported that 70,000 persons were murdered in the euthanasia program; recent research in the archives of the former East Germany indicate that the number of victims in Germany and Austria was about 200,000.

=== NKVD special camps in East Germany 1945–1950 ===
The Soviets set up NKVD special camps in the Soviet-occupied parts of Germany and areas east of the Oder-Neisse line to intern Germans accused of ties to the Nazis, or because they were hindering the establishment of Stalinism in East Germany. Between 122,000 and 150,000 were detained and at least 43,000 did not survive.

=== Expulsion of Germans after World War II and the forced labor of Germans in the Soviet Union ===
Civilian deaths, due to the flight and expulsion of Germans and the forced labor of Germans in the Soviet Union, are sometimes included with World War II casualties. During the Cold War, the West German government estimated the death toll at 2.225 million in the wartime evacuations, forced labor in the Soviet Union as well as the post war expulsions. This figure was to remain unchallenged until the 1990s when some German historians put the actual death toll in the expulsions at 500,000 confirmed deaths listed in a 1965 German Red Cross study. The German Historical Museum puts the figure at 600,000 dead; they maintain the figure of 2 million expulsion deaths cannot be supported. However, the position of the German government, the German Federal Agency for Civic Education and the German Red Cross is that the death toll in the expulsions is between 2.0 and 2.5 million civilians. The German historian Rüdiger Overmans maintains that there are more arguments for a lower figure of 500,000 rather than the higher figures of over 2.0 million. He believes that the previous studies by the German government should be subject to critical revision and new research is needed to establish the actual number of expulsion deaths.

==== Studies published by the West German government estimating expulsion deaths ====
- In 1950 the West German government made a preliminary estimate of 3,000,000 German civilians missing in Eastern Europe (1.5 million from pre war Germany and 1.5 million ethnic Germans from East Europe) whose fate needed to be clarified. This estimate was later superseded by the 1958 German Government demographic study.
- The Schieder commission from 1953 to 1961 estimated 2.3 million civilian deaths in the expulsions- Germany in 1937 borders the Oder-Neisse region 2,167,000 (figure includes 500,000 military and 50,000 air raid dead); Poland (1939 borders) 217,000, Free City of Danzig 100,000; Czechoslovakia 225,600; Yugoslavia 69,000; Rumania 10,000; Hungary 6,000 The statistical information in the Schieder Report was later superseded by the 1958 German Government demographic study.
- The West German government statistical office issued a report in 1958 that put the number of civilians dead or missing in the expulsions and forced labor in the USSR at 2,225,000 (including 1,339,000 for Germany in 1937 borders; Poland 185,000, Danzig 83,200; Czechoslovakia 272,900; Yugoslavia 135,800; Rumania 101,000; Hungary 57,000; Baltic States 51,400). The figures include those killed in the 1945 military campaign and the forced labor of Germans in the Soviet Union. The figures from this report are often cited by historians writing in the English language. Rüdiger Overmans pointed out that these figures represent persons whose fate had not been clarified, not necessarily dead as a result of the expulsions.
- The West German government set up a unified body the Suchdienst (search service) of the German churches working in conjunction with the German Red Cross to trace the individual fates of those who were dead or missing as result of the expulsions and deportations. In 1965 the final report was issued by the search service which was able to confirm 473,013 civilian deaths in Eastern Europe; and an additional 1,905,991 cases whose fate could not be determined. This report remained confidential until 1987. Rüdiger Overmans presented a summary of this data at a 1994 historical symposium in Poland.
- In 1974, the West German Federal Archive (Bundesarchiv) issued a report to "compile and evaluate information available in the Federal Archives and elsewhere regarding crimes and brutalities committed against Germans in the course of the expulsion". The report estimated 600,000 civilian deaths (150,000 violent Deaths during war in 1945; 200,000 in Forced labor of Germans in the Soviet Union and 250,000 in post war internment Camps and forced labor in Eastern Europe) In particular, the report identified deaths due to crimes against international law: the 1958 report of the Federal Office for Statistics listed as "post-war losses" two million people whose fate remained unaccounted for in the population balance, but who according to the 1974 report were "not exclusively victims of crimes against international law" such as post war deaths due to malnutrition and disease.

==== Recent research on German expulsion losses ====
- The Deutsches Historisches Museum puts the number of dead at 600,000, they maintain the official figure of 2 million cannot be supported.
- In his 2000 study of German military casualties Rüdiger Overmans found 344,000 additional military deaths of Germans from the Former eastern territories of Germany and conscripted ethnic Germans from Eastern Europe. Overmans believes this will reduce the number of civilians previously listed as missing in the expulsions. Overmans did not investigate civilian expulsion losses, only military casualties, he merely noted that other studies estimated of expulsion losses from about 500,000 to 2,000,000. Overmans maintains that there are more arguments for a lower figure of 500,000 rather than the higher figures of over 2.0 million. He believes new research on the number of expulsion deaths is needed since only 500,000 of the reported 2,000,00 deaths have been confirmed.
- The German historian Ingo Haar maintains that civilian losses in the expulsions have been overstated for decades by the German government for political reasons. Haar argues that during the Cold War the West German government put political pressure on the Statistisches Bundesamt to push the figures upward to agree to the Search Service combined total of 2.3 million dead and missing. Haar maintains that the Search Service figure of 1.9 million missing persons is based on unreliable information and that the actual death toll in the expulsions is between 500 and 600,000 which is based on confirmed deaths.
- The German historians Hans Henning Hahn and Eva Hahn have published a detailed study of the flight and expulsions that is sharply critical of official German accounts of the cold war era. The Hahn's believe that the official German figure of 2 million deaths is a historical myth that lacks foundation. The Hahn's point out that the figure of 473,013 confirmed deaths includes 80,522 in the post war period; they maintain that most of the deaths occurred during the Nazi organized flight and evacuation during the war, and the Forced labor of Germans in the Soviet Union. They place the ultimate blame for the mass flight and expulsion on the wartime policy of the Nazis in Eastern Europe.
- In 2006 the German government reaffirmed its belief that 2.0 to 2.5 million civilians perished in the flight and expulsion from Eastern Europe. They maintain that the figure is correct because it includes additional deaths from malnutrition and disease of those civilians subject to the expulsions. State Secretary in the German Federal Ministry of the Interior, Christoph Bergner, outlined the stance of the respective governmental institutions in Deutschlandfunk saying that the numbers presented by the German government and others are not contradictory to the numbers cited by Haar, and that the below 600,000 estimate comprises the deaths directly caused by atrocities during the expulsion measures and thus only includes people who on the spot were raped, beaten, or else brought to death, while the above two millions estimate also includes people who on their way to post-war Germany have died of epidemics, hunger, cold, air raids and the like.

== Total population losses, 1939–1946 ==
Estimated total German population losses (in 1937 German borders) directly related to the war range between 5.5 to 6.9 million persons. These figures do not include ethnic Germans from other nations in the German military and ethnic German civilians who were killed in expulsions. In 1956 the West German government figures in the table below list an estimated about 5.5 million deaths (military and civilian) directly caused by the war within the borders of 1937. (Note: Includes 3,760,000 military dead and missing; Civilian deaths: 410,000 in air war; 20,000 in military campaign and 1,260,000 expellee deaths east of the Oder Neisse line.) A study by the German demographer Peter Marschalck put the total deaths directly related to the war both military and civilians at 5.2 million, plus an estimated decline in births of 1.7 million, bringing total population losses related to the war at 6.9 million persons within the borders of 1937. There were additional deaths of the ethnic Germans outside of Germany in Eastern Europe, men conscripted during the war and ethnic German civilian deaths during post war expulsions.

=== German government figures (2005) ===
In 2005 the German government Suchdienste (Search Service) put the total combined German military and civilian war dead at 7,375,800, including Volksdeutsche (ethnic Germans) outside of Germany and Austrians. This figure includes 4.3 million military dead and missing, 500,000 killed by strategic bombing, 300,000 victims of Nazi political, racial and religious persecution, 2,251,500 civilian dead in expulsions and 24,300 Austrian civilians.

=== Population balance for Germany in 1937 borders (not including Austria or the ethnic Germans of East Europe): May 1939 to October 1946 ===
According to West German Government 1956
Germany in 1937 borders	Population balance
Starting population (May 1939 Census)	69,310,000
Live births	8,670,000
Net immigration:German refugees	4,080,000
Subtotal additions	12,750,000
Civilians: Death by natural causes	(7,130,000)
Civilians killed in air war	(410,000)
Civilians killed in 1945 land battles	(20,000)
Military dead	(3,760,000)
POW held by Allies	(1,750,000)
Germans remaining in Poland	(1,750,000)
Germans remaining abroad	(130,000)
Expulsion and deportation civilian dead/missing	(1,260,000)
Emigrated & murdered Jews	(200,000)
Net emigration of foreign population	(200,000)
Other, misc.	(140,000)
Subtotal reductions	(16,750,000)
Final population (October 1946 Census)	65,310,000

Source for figures: Wirtschaft und Statistik, October 1956, journal published by Statistisches Bundesamt Deutschland (German Federal Statistical Office).

Notes

1. Population May 1939 Census These figures are for Germany in 1937 borders, they do not include Austria or the ethnic Germans of East Europe.
2. Live births are those actually recorded from May 1939 until June 1944 and from January to October 1946. The gap in vital statistics between the middle of 1944 and the end of 1945 was estimated.
3. Net immigrationGerman refugees were ethnic Germans of Eastern Europe who lived outside Germany in 1937 borders before the war.
4. Civilian deaths These are deaths due to natural causes not directly related to the war. Figure includes deaths actually recorded from May 1939 until June 1944 and from January to October 1946. The gap in vital statistics between the middle of 1944 and the end of 1945 was estimated. The German government Statistical Office figures in the above table put the deaths due to natural causes at 7,130,000. A study by the German demographer Peter Marschalck estimated the expected deaths from natural causes based on the peacetime death rate would have been 5,900,000. The German economist Bruno Gleitze from the German Institute for Economic Research estimated that included in the total of 7.1 million deaths by natural causes that there were 1,2 million excess deaths caused by an increase in mortality due to the harsh conditions in Germany during and after the war. (Note: Gleitze estimated 400,000 excess deaths during the war and 800,000 in post war Germany.) In Allied occupied Germany the shortage of food was an acute problem in 1946–47 the average kilocalorie intake per day was only 1,600 to 1,800, an amount insufficient for long-term health.
5. Killed in air war Figure for civilians only, does not include 23,000 police and military and 32,000 POW and foreign workers.
6. Killed in 1945 land battles- This is a rough estimate made in 1956 for Germany in current post war borders, not including the former German territories in post war Poland. However, there is a more recent estimate of 22,000 civilians killed during the fighting in Berlin only.
7. Military dead Includes Wehrmacht as well as SS/police and paramilitary forces. The Statistisches Bundesamt put the total at 3,760,000. The Overmans study of German military casualties put the total at about 4.4 million.
8. POWs still held by Allies- 1,750,000 POW from within Germany's 1937 borders were still held by the Allies in October 1946. Total German POWs held at that time were about 2.5 million, including 300,000 men from other nations conscripted by Nazi Germany but not included in the 1939 population and 384,000 POW held in Germany who are included in the 1946 census figures. By 1950 almost all POW had been released except for 29,000 men held in forced labor in the USSR or convicted as war criminals.
9. Germans remaining in Poland in October 1946 were 1,750,000, but by 1950 the number had been reduced to 1,100,000 because of expulsions after October 1946. Those remaining in 1950 became Polish citizens but were German nationals in 1939.
10. Germans remaining abroad Includes expelled Germans who had emigrated to other countries or were in Denmark.
11. Expulsion and deportation dead This estimate is only for the Oder-Neisse region of Germany in the 1937 borders, not including the ethnic Germans of other Eastern European nations. Figure includes civilian deaths in the 1945 military campaign, the forced labor in the USSR as well as excess deaths due to post war famine and disease. The German Church Service put the total of confirmed expulsion dead at about 300,000 for Germany in the 1937 borders, the balance of 960,000 were reported as missing and whose fate had not been clarified.
12. Emigrated & murdered Jews- The Statistisches Bundesamt (German Federal Statistical Office) gave a total of 200,000 Jews who had emigrated or were murdered, they did not estimate those actually who were murdered. Most sources outside of Germany put the Holocaust death toll in Germany at about 150,000 Jews.
13. Net emigration of foreign population The Statistisches Bundesamt pointed out that this was a rough estimate.
14. Other, misc. The Statistisches Bundesamt defined the others as "emigrated Germans, POW remaining abroad voluntarily, and German concentration camp deaths" (deutsche KZ-Opfer).
15. Population October 1946 Census Figure of 65,310,000 does not include 693,000 displaced persons (DPs) living in Germany. Figure includes 853,000 in the Saarland.

=== Population balance for Austria ===
The Austrian government provides the following information on human losses during the rule of the Nazis.

For Austria the consequences of the Nazi regime and the Second World War were disastrous: During this period 2,700 Austrians had been executed and more than 16,000 citizens murdered in the concentration camps. Some 16,000 Austrians were killed in prison, while over 67,000 Austrian Jews were deported to death camps, only 2,000 of them lived to see the end of the war. In addition, 247,000 Austrians lost their lives serving in the army of the Third Reich or were reported missing, and 24,000 civilians were killed during bombing raids.

=== Population balance for the ethnic Germans of Eastern Europe ===
In 1958, the West German government statistical office put the losses of the ethnic Germans at 1,318,000 (886,000 civilians in the expulsions and 411,000 in the German military and 22,000 in the Hungarian and Romanian military). The research of Rüdiger Overmans puts military losses of ethnic Germans at 534,000. Ingo Haar points out that of the 886,000 estimated civilian dead from east Europe only about 170,000 deaths have been confirmed; the balance are considered unsolved cases.

== Controversies over German losses ==
In post-war Germany the fate of civilians and prisoners of war has been a contentious topic. The current view of the German government is that these losses were due to an aggressive war started by the German nation. However, there are fringe groups who attempt to trivialize the crimes of the Hitler period by comparing German losses to the Holocaust.

The bombing of Dresden and the bombing campaign in general has been a topic of discussion in post-war Germany. Amongst others, the German historian Wolfgang Benz believes that the use of the term "Bombing Holocaust" runs contrary to historical fact. The German government currently places the ultimate blame for the mass flight and expulsion on the wartime policy of the Nazis in Eastern Europe. There are those like Heinz Nawratil who try to equate the expulsions from Eastern Europe with the Holocaust. The German historian Martin Broszat (former head of Institute of Contemporary History in Munich) described Nawratil's writings as "polemics with a nationalist-rightist point of view", and that Nawratil "exaggerates in an absurd manner the scale of 'expulsion crimes'". The Federation of Expellees has represented the interests of Germans from Eastern Europe. Erika Steinbach, the current President of the Federation, provoked outrage when she supported the statements of other members of the expellee organization claiming that Hitler's attack on Poland was a response to Poland's policy. The Federation of Expellees initiated the formation of the Center Against Expulsions. The former President of Germany Joachim Gauck and the former German chancellor Angela Merkel have voiced support for the Center Against Expulsions. However, in Poland it is viewed by some as an attempt to reopen the wounds of the war and to revert to pre-war borders.

The fate of over one million missing German soldiers in the USSR was an issue in post-war West Germany, with some claiming that they were held in secret labor camps by the Soviets. It is now known that they did not survive the war; Rüdiger Overmans believes that more than likely they died in Soviet custody.

James Bacque, a Canadian author with no previous historical research experience, has written a book Other Losses in which he claims that the United States are responsible for the deaths of 800,000 to 1,000,000 German POW. Based on his own research Bacque claims that documents from the US Archives show that there were 800,000 German POW who did not survive US captivity. Bacque alleges that General Eisenhower and the US military deliberately withheld support for the German POW, causing their deaths. Bacque presents his arguments with a description of the horrific conditions at the Rheinwiesenlager POW camps and eyewitness accounts of retired US military officers. Bacque maintains that there has been a conspiracy by the United States to cover up these losses. Bacque's book received wide attention when it was first published in 1989, since then his claims have been challenged by historians who have found his thesis to be unsubstantiated. The US military historian Stephen Ambrose was co-editor of the book Eisenhower and the German POWs in which he refutes Bacque's claims. Ambrose maintains that the figure of 800,000 POW missing from the US records was a bookkeeping error, that many POW were released and no records were maintained. Ambrose points out that the US and the UK had to cope with a major logistical problem in order to maintain the huge number of surrendered German personnel and finds the claim that Eisenhower and the US military deliberately withheld support for the German POW to be without merit. Rüdiger Overmans believes that "on the basis of factual individual data, shown before, the thesis of the Canadian James Bacque cannot be supported".

== Database of fallen soldiers ==
A humanitarian organisation, known as (German: Volksbund Deutsche Kriegsgräberfürsorge, lit. 'German War Graves Commission'), is directed by the Federal Republic of Germany to record all the German fallen soldiers and maintain their graveyards abroad in 46 countries. The organisation was founded on 16 December 1919 to look after World War I soldiers' graves. Later on, it again commenced to track German casualties starting from 1946 after World War II. Currently, the commission runs an online database in which soldiers' family can search for the missing relatives.

Estimates indicate that at least 40,000 war casualties are found a year. The commission has already built more than 300 cemeteries from World War II and 190 from World War I all over Europe.

== Sources ==
- Antill, Peter (10 October 2005). Berlin 1945. End of the Thousand Year Reich. Illustrated by Peter Dennis. Bloomsbury USA. ISBN 1-84176-915-0.
- Arntz, Helmut, ed. (1961). Germany reports. Introduction by Konrad Adenauer (3rd ed.). Bonn: Presse- und Informationsamt.
- Australia-Japan Research Project (n.d.). "Dispositions and deaths". Australia-Japan Research Project.
- Benz, Wolfgang (1996). Feindbild und Vorurteil: Beiträge über Ausgrenzung und Verfolgung (in German). München: Deutscher Taschenbuch Verlag. ISBN 3-423-04694-5. OCLC 36081946. OL 12698891M.
- Bergner, Christoph (29 November 2006). "Keine deutsche Opferarithmetik". Deutschlandradio (Interview) (in German). Interviewed by Koldehoff, Stefan. Archived from the original on 10 February 2008.
- Bischoff, Günter; Ambrose, Stephen Edward (1992). "Introduction". Eisenhower and the German POWs. New York: Louisiana State University Press. ISBN 0-8071-1758-7. LCCN 92003908. OCLC 25282523. OL 1702887M.
- Botting, Douglas (1983). The Aftermath: Europe (World War II). Time-Life Books. ISBN 0-8094-3411-3. "2,000,000"
- Brinkley, Douglas; Haskew, Michael E. (2004). The World War II Desk Reference. New York: HarperCollins. ISBN 9780060526511. LCCN 2004301224. OCLC 57579492. OL 3327078M.
- Bullock, Alan (1992). Hitler and Stalin: Parallel Lives. New York: Knopf. ISBN 0394586018. OCLC 23767230. OL 22597418M.
- Bundesarchiv (2025). "Euthanasie im Dritten Reich". Bundesarchiv (in German). "Zwischen 1939 und 1945 wurden insgesamt ca. 200.000 Frauen, Männer und Kinder aus psychiatrischen Einrichtungen des Deutschen Reichs in mehreren verdeckten Aktionen durch Vergasung, Medikamente oder unzureichende Ernährung ermordet. Hinzu kamen fast 100.000 weitere Morde an Psychiatriepatienten in den besetzten oder annektierten Gebieten."
- "Our Foundation". Zentrum gegen Vertreibungen (Centre against Expulsions). n.d. Archived from the original on 1 August 2009.
- Clodfelter, Micheal (2002). Warfare and Armed Conflicts: A Statistical Reference to Casualty and Other Figures, 1500-2000 (2nd ed.). Jefferson: McFarland. ISBN 0-7864-1204-6. LCCN 2001044962. OCLC 48066096. OL 3951235M.
- Cornelius, Kai (2004). Vom spurlosen Verschwindenlassen zur Benachrichtigungspflicht bei Festnahmen. Berlin: BWV Berliner Wissenschafts-Verlag. ISBN 3-8305-1165-5.
- Crossland, David (8 May 2012). "Germany Still Locates 40,000 War Casualties a Year". Der Spiegel.
- Dear, Ian C. B.; Foot, Michael Richard Daniell (2005). Oxford Companion to World War II. Oxford: Oxford University Press. ISBN 0-19-280670-X. OCLC 795562933. OL 7383460M.
- "A Brief Introduction". Volksbund Deutsche Kriegsgräberfürsorge e.V. n.d. Archived from the original on 22 December 2018.
- Dupuy, Richard Ernest; Dupuy, Trevor Nevitt (1993). Harper Encyclopedia of Military History (4th ed.). New York: Harper Collins. ISBN 9780062700568. LCCN 92017853. OCLC 26012613. OL 1715499M.
- Echternkamp, Jörg (2004). Das Deutsche Reich und der Zweite Weltkrieg. Vol. 9, Die Deutsche Kriegsgesellschaft 1939 bis 1945. Ralf Blank. München: Deutsche Verlagsanstalt. ISBN 3-421-06236-6. OCLC 177309866.
- Echternkamp, Jörg (2008). Germany and the Second World War. Vol. 9. Oxford: Clarenden Press. ISBN 978-0-19-160860-5.
- Eckhardt, William (1987). Sivard, Ruth Leger (ed.). "Wars and War-Related Deaths. 1700-1987". World Military and Social Expenditures (1987–88) (12th ed.). ISBN 0-918281-05-9. ISSN 0363-4795. OCLC 17513401. OL 11439939M.
- Eisenhower, Dwight D. (1948). Crusade in Europe. London: Heinemann. OCLC 930444763.
- Ellis, John (1993a). The World War II Databook. London: Aurum Press. ISBN 1-8541-0254-0. LCCN 94128341. OCLC 29636410. OL 1153170M.
- Ellis, John (1993b). World War II. A Statistical Survey. New York: Facts on File. ISBN 0-8160-2971-7. LCCN 93010627. OCLC 27974457. OL 1402650M.
- Robert McHenry, ed. (1992). "n.t.". The New Encyclopædia Britannica (15 ed.). Chicago: Encyclopædia Britannica, Incorporated. ISBN 978-0-85229-663-9. OCLC 37558138. "2,384,000"
- David Hoibert, ed. (2010). "World Wars". The New Encyclopædia Britannica (15 ed.). Chicago: Encyclopædia Britannica, Incorporated. ISBN 978-0-85229-663-9. OCLC 37558138.
- Frumkin, Gregory (1951). Population Changes in Europe Since 1939. Geneva.
- Glaser, Kurt; Possony, Stephan (1979). Victims of Politics. "2,111,000"
- Greiner, Helmuth; Schramm, Percy Ernst, eds. (1982). Kriegstagebuch des Oberkommandos der Wehrmacht (Wehrmachtführungsstab): 1940 - 1945. München: Bernard and Graefe. ISBN 9783881990738. OCLC 10580569. OL 15297701M.
- Haar, Ingo (2007a). "'Bevölkerungsbilanzen' und 'Vertreibungsverluste'. Zur Wissenschaftsgeschichte der deutschen Opferangaben aus Flucht und Vertreibung". In Josef Ehmer; Ursula Ferdinand; Jürgen Reulecke (eds.). Herausforderung Bevölkerung: Zu Entwicklungen des modernen Denkens über die Bevölkerung vor, im und nach dem 'Dritten Reich' (in German). Wiesbaden: Springer VS (published 2007). pp. 267–281. doi:10.1007/978-3-531-90653-9. ISBN 978-3-531-15556-2. LCCN 2008365383. OCLC 191922430. OL 23163187M. Wikidata Q56552060.
- Haar, Ingo (2007b). "Die deutschen 'Vertreibungsverluste' – Zur Entstehungsgeschichte der 'Dokumentation der Vertreibung der Deutschen aus Ost-Mitteleuropa'". Tel Aviver Jahrbuch für deutsche Geschichte. 35. Minerva Institute for Germany History, Faculty of Humanities, Tel Aviv University. ISBN 978-3-8353-0135-1.
- Haar, Ingo (2009). "Die deutschen 'Vertreibungsverluste' – Forschungsstand, Kontexte und Probleme". In Mackensen, Rainer; Reulecke, Jürgen; Ehmer, Josef (eds.). Ursprünge, Arten und Folgen des Konstrukts "Bevölkerung" vor, im und nach dem "Dritten Reich". Zur Geschichte der deutschen Bevölkerungswissenschaft. Wiesbaden: Springer VS. pp. 363–381. doi:10.1007/978-3-531-91514-2_17. ISBN 978-3-531-16152-5. LCCN 2008386904. OL 24102676M.
- Hahnová, Eva; Hahn, Hans Henning (2010). Die Vertreibung im deutschen Erinnern. Legenden, Mythos, Geschichte (in German). Paderborn: Schöningh. ISBN 978-3-506-77044-8.
- Hampe, Erich (1963). Der Zivile Luftschutz im Zweiten Weltkrieg (in German). Frankfurt: Bernard und Graefe. Archived from the original on 5 December 2016.
- Gleitze, Bruno (1953). "Deutschlands Bevölkerungsverluste durch den Zweiten Weltkrieg". Vierteljahrshefte zur Wirtschaftsforschung. 4: 375–384. ISSN 0340-1707.
- Hartmann, Christian (2013). Operation Barbarossa: Nazi Germany's War in the East, 1941–1945. Oxford: Oxford University Press. ISBN 978-0-19-966078-0. "Since the end of the 1990s, we have known that the total German military losses were actually far higher that had long been believed: close to 5,318,000 men [...]."
- Hubert, Michel (1998). Deutschland im Wandel. Geschichte der Deutschen Bevölkerung seit 1815. Stuttgart: Franz Steiner Verlag. ISBN 3-515-07392-2. OCLC 40633410. OL 26706468M.
- "German and Italian Prisoners of War in the United Kingdom". Imperial War Museum. 2013. Archived from the original on 29 October 2013.
- Ishikida, Miki Y (13 July 2005). Toward Peace: War Responsibility, Postwar Compensation, and Peace Movements and Education in Japan. New York: iUniverse. ISBN 0595350631. OCLC 62267243. OL 7557211M.
- Jenner, Harald, ed. (2004). Quellen zur Geschichte der "Euthanasie"-Verbrechen 1939-1945 in deutschen und österreichischen Archiven. Ein Inventar (PDF) (Report). Bundesarchiv. "daß wohl insgesamt mit der Zahl von 200.000 Ermordungen zu rechnen ist (transl. 'a total of 200,000 murders is probably to be expected')."
- Kaczmarek, Ryszard (2010). "Wcieleni do Wehrmachtu – rozmowa z prof. Ryszardem Kaczmarkiem" [Conscripted into the Wehrmacht – interview with Prof. Ryszard Kaczmarek]. Tygodnik Przegląd (Interview) (in Polish). No. 38/2012. Interviewed by Dybicz, Paweł. Kraków: Wydawnictwo Literackie. Archived from the original on 15 November 2012.
- Kammerer, Anja; Kammerer, Willi (2010). Narben bleiben: Die Arbeit der Suchdienste – 60 Jahre nach dem Zweiten Weltkrieg [Scars Remain. The work of the Search Services – 60 Years after the Second World War] (PDF) (in German) (4th ed.). Berlin: Deutsche Dienststelle. Wikidata Q133389975. Archived from the original (PDF) on 28 February 2021.
- Keegan, John (1990). The Second World War. New York: Penguin Books. ISBN 9780140113419. LCCN 90006801. OCLC 20132298. OL 1854996M.
- Keegan, John (1989). The Second World War. New York: Penguin Books. ISBN 0-14-011341-X. LCCN 90006801. OCLC 21078573. OL 1854996M.
- Keegan, John (1997). Atlas of the Second World War. London: HarperCollins. ISBN 0-7230-1007-2. OCLC 39363076.
- Kinder, Hermann; Hilgemann, Werner; Menze, Ernest A. (1978). Anchor Atlas of World History. Vol. 2. "3,000,000"
- Köhler, Horst (2 September 2006). "Rede von Bundespräsident Horst Köhler beim Tag der Heimat des Bundes der Vertriebenen am 2. September 2006 in Berlin" [Speech by Federal President Horst Köhler at the Day of the Homeland of the Federation of the Expelled on 2. September 2006 in Berlin] (PDF). Deutsche Vertretungen in Polen (in German). Archived from the original (PDF) on 2 December 2012.
- Krivosheev, G. I. (1997). Soviet Casualties and Combat Losses. Greenhill. ISBN 978-1-85367-280-4. LCCN 97019004. OCLC 36884089. OL 672941M.
- Marley, David, ed. (1942). The Daily Telegraph Story of the War. London: Hodder & Stoughton. ASIN B0006DCJ2S. OCLC 9987351. OL 45740003M. "The Allied armies in the west captured more than 1,500,000 prisoners during April."
- Maschke, Erich (1962–1974). Zur Geschichte der deutschen Kriegsgefangenen des Zweiten Weltkrieges Bielefeld (in German). Vol. 15. Bielefeld: E. and W. Gieseking. LCCN 64054269. OCLC 2339878. OL 5929313M.
- MacDonald, Charles Brown (1993). The Last Offensive. United States Army in World War II: The European Theater of Operations. Washington: Center of Military History United States Army. LCCN 71183070. OCLC 30379821. OL 17112470M. "Allied casualties from D-day to V–E totaled 766,294. American losses were 586,628, including 135,576 dead. The British, Canadians, French, and other allies in the west lost slightly over 60,000 dead [...]."
- Maier, Charles S. (1988). The Unmasterable Past: History, Holocaust, and German National Identity. Harvard University. ISBN 0-674-92975-6. "2,000,000"
- Marschalck, Peter (1984). Bevölkerungsgeschichte Deutschlands im 19. und 20. Jahrhundert (in German). Frankfurt: Suhrkamp Verlag. ISBN 3518112449. LCCN 84150571. OL 2917997M.
- Marshall, George Catlett (1996). Biennial Reports of the Chief of Staff of the United States Army to the Secretary of War, 1 July 1939 - 30 June 1945 (PDF) (Report). Washington: Center of Military History, United States Army. Archived from the original (PDF) on 2 May 2017.
- Milward, Alan S. (1984). The Reconstruction of Western Europe, 1945–51. Berkeley: University of California Press. ISBN 0520052064. LCCN 83017931. OCLC 9918266. OL 3175539M.
- Minasyan, M.M., ed. (1974). Great Patriotic War of the Soviet Union, 1941–1945: A General Outline. Translated by Skvirsky, David; Schneierson, Vic. Moscow: Progress. OCLC 2525840.
- Müller-Hillebrand, Burkhart (1969). Das Heer 1933–1945. Entwicklung des organisatorischen Aufbaues. Vol. 3, Der Zweifrontenkrieg. Das Heer vom Beginn des Feldzuges gegen die Sowjetunion bis zum Kriegsende. Frankfurt am Main: E.S. Mittler & Sohn. OCLC 74062123.
- Overmans, Rüdiger (1989). "Die Toten des Zweiten Weltkrieges in Deutschland. Bilanz der Forschung unter besonderer Berücksichtigung der Wehrmacht und Vertreibungsverluste". In Michalka, Wolfgang (ed.). Der Zweite Weltkrieg. Analysen, Grundzüge, Forschungsbilanz. München: Piper. ISBN 3-4921-0811-3. LCCN 90138791. OCLC 1443856303. OL 1925719M.
- Overmans, Rüdiger (1994). "Personelle Verluste der deutschen Bevölkerung durch Flucht und Vertreibung". Dzieje Najnowsze Rocznik. 26 (2). ISSN 0419-8824. S2CID 176356611.
- Overmans, Rüdiger (2000a). Deutsche militärische Verluste im Zweiten Weltkrieg [German military losses in the Second World War]. Contributions to Military History (in German) (2nd ed.). Oldenburg: De Gruyter. ISBN 3-486-56531-1. OCLC 46862998. Wikidata Q133373167.
- Overmans, Rüdiger (2000b). Soldaten hinter Stacheldraht: Deutsche Kriegsgefangene des Zweiten Weltkriegs [Soldiers behind Barbed Wire. German prisoners of war of the Second World War] (in German). Berlin: Propyläen Verlag. ISBN 3-549-07121-3. LCCN 2001349936. OCLC 51046732. OL 12813382M. Wikidata Q133383781.
- Overmans, Rüdiger (2002). Soldaten hinter Stacheldraht: Deutsche Kriegsgefangene des Zweiten Weltkriegs [Soldiers behind Barbed Wire. German prisoners of war of the Second World War] (in German). Munich: Ullstein Verlag. ISBN 3-548-36328-8. OCLC 226282496. OL 12812799M. Wikidata Q133385393.
- Prauser, Steffen; Rees, Arfon, eds. (2004). The Expulsion of the 'German' Communities from Eastern Europe at the End of the Second World War (PDF) (Report). Florence: European University Institute. "2,000,000"
- Overy, Richard (2013). The Bombers and the Bombed: Allied Air War Over Europe 1940–1945. New York: Viking. pp. 304–307. ISBN 978-0-670-02515-2. LCCN 2013018405. OCLC 1285462448. OL 26919667M.
- Overy, Richard (2014). The Bombers and the Bombed: Allied Air War Over Europe 1940-1945.
- Paterson, Tony (11 September 2010). "Merkel ally quits after claiming Nazis didn't start war". The Independent. London.
- Pogue, Forrest C. (1989) [1954]. The Supreme Command (PDF). United States Army in World War II: The European Theater of Operations. Washington: Center of Military History United States Army. OCLC 1013540453. Archived from the original (PDF) on 14 March 2024.
- Rummel, Rudolph Joseph (1990). Lethal Politics: Soviet Genocide and Mass Murder Since 1917. New Brunswick: Transaction Publishers. ISBN 0-88738-333-5.
- Rummel, Rudolph Joseph (1992). "Democide: Nazi Genocide and Mass Murder". University of Hawaiʻi System. New Brunswick: Transaction Publishers.
- Rummel, Rudolph Joseph (1994). "Death by Government". University of Hawaiʻi System. New Brunswick: Transaction Publishers.
- Rummel, Rudolph Joseph (1997). "Statistics of Democide: Genocide and Mass Murder Since 1900". University of Hawaiʻi System. Charlottesville, Virginia: Center for National Security Law, School of Law, University of Virginia and Transaction Publishers, Rutgers University.
- Schieder, Theodor, ed. (1954–1961). Dokumentation der Vertreibung der Deutschen aus Ost-Mitteleuropa. Vol. 1–5. Bonn: Bundesministerium für Vertriebene.
- Schoenberg, H.W. (1970). Germans from the East: A Study of their migration, resettlement and subsequent group history, since 1945. London: Springer. ISBN 90-247-5044-X. "2,225,000"
- Schramm, Percy Ernst, ed. (1960). Geschichte des zweiten Weltkrieges (in German). Würzburg: Ploetz. OCLC 13377360. S2CID 160460472.
- Schramm, Percy Ernst (23 July 2008) [27 October 1949]. "Die deutschen Verluste im Zweiten Weltkrieg" [The German losses in the Second World War]. Die Zeit (in German). Archived from the original on 8 May 2010.
- Scriba, Arnulf (19 May 2015). "Die Flucht der deutschen Bevölkerung 1944/45". Deutsches Historisches Museum. Berlin.
- Siegel, Silke (1989). Vertreibung und Vertreibungsverbrechen 1945-1948. Bericht des Bundesarchivs vom 28. Mai 1974. Archivalien und ausgewählte Erlebnisberichte. Bonn: Kulturstiftung der Deutschen Vertriebenen. ISBN 388557067X. LCCN 90154016. OCLC 21976261. OL 1936007M.
- Small, Melvin; Singer, J. David (1982). Resort to Arms: International and Civil Wars, 1816-1980. Beverly Hills: Sage. ISBN 0-8039-1776-7. LCCN 81018518. OL 4272302M.
- "Military Deaths in World War II". Statistical Bulletin. 27 (1, January 1946). Metropolitan Life Insurance Company: 6–8. January 1946. ISSN 0741-9767.
- Statistisches Bundesamt (November 1949). Wirtschaft und Statistik (PDF). Wiesbaden: Statistisches Bundesamt. pp. 215–252, 691–842. ISSN 1619-2907 – via Statistische Ämter des Bundes und der Länder.
- Statistisches Bundesamt (April 1950). Wirtschaft und Statistik (PDF). Vol. 2. Wiesbaden: Statistisches Bundesamt. pp. 1–32, 1–174. ISSN 1619-2907 – via Statistische Ämter des Bundes und der Länder.
- Statistisches Bundesamt (October 1956). Wirtschaft und Statistik (PDF). Wiesbaden: Statistisches Bundesamt. pp. 489–574. ISSN 1619-2907 – via Statistische Ämter des Bundes und der Länder.
  - Sperling, Hans (1956). "Die Luftkriegsverluste während des zweiten Weltkriegs in Deutschland" (PDF). Wirtschaft und Statistik (10, Oktober 1956). Wiesbaden: Statistisches Bundesamt: 498–500. ISSN 1619-2907 – via Statistische Ämter des Bundes und der Länder.
  - Nellner, Werner (1956). "Deutsche Bevölkerungsbilanz des 2. Weltkrieges" (PDF). Wirtschaft und Statistik (10, Oktober 1956). Wiesbaden: Statistisches Bundesamt: 493–498. ISSN 1619-2907 – via Statistische Ämter des Bundes und der Länder.
- Statistisches Bundesamt (1958). Die deutschen Vertreibungsverluste. Bevölkerungsbilanzen für die deutschen Vertreibungsgebiete 1939/50 (PDF). Stuttgart: Kohlhammer Verlag. LCCN 59025383. OCLC 7363969. OL 5779958M.
- Statistisches Bundesamt (1960). Statistisches Jahrbuch für die Bundesrepublik Deutschland (PDF) (in German). Stuttgart: W. Kohlhammer – via Statistische Ämter des Bundes und der Länder.
- Tálos, Emmerich; Horvath, Elisabeth (2000). Austria facts and Figures. Vienna: Federal Press Service. Archived from the original on 6 March 2016.
- "n.t.". The Times. London. 23 February 1945. p. 4.
- "A Whipped Army, Review by Supreme Commander". The Times. London. 28 March 1945. p. 4. "Quarter of a million German soldiers have been captured since March 1 [...]."
- "n.t.". The Times. London. 1 May 1945. p. 4.
- Tucker, Spencer Coakley (2004). Encyclopedia of World War II. Santa Barbara: ABC-Clio. ISBN 978-1-576-07999-7. OCLC 1097808444.
- Strategic Bombing Survey (1945a). Summary Report (European War). Washington, D.C.: United States Department of War. hdl:2027/hvd.32044049744071. OCLC 51657101. OL 45420050M. Wikidata Q133728936.
- Strategic Bombing Survey (1945b). The Effects of Strategic Bombing on the German War Economy. Overall Economic Effects Division. Washington, D.C.: United States Department of War. hdl:2027/mdp.39015017684799. OCLC 34592087. OL 52990082M. Wikidata Q133728939.
- Strategic Bombing Survey (1947a). The Effect of Bombing on Health and Medical Care in Germany. Morale Division. Washington, D.C.: United States Department of War. hdl:2027/mdp.39015009496681. OL 15439875M. Wikidata Q133728938. "No complete and accurate figures on German civilian air raid casualties, covering the entire period of the war, were available. [...] It was further estimated that an additional number, approximating 25 per cent of the known deaths in 1944 and 1945, were still unrecovered and unrecorded. With the addition of this estimate of 1944 and 1945 unrecorded deaths, the final estimation gave in round numbers a half million German civilians killed by Allied aerial attacks [...]."
- Strategic Bombing Survey (1947b). Civilian Defense Division Final Report. Civilian Defense Division. Washington, D.C.: United States Department of War. hdl:2027/mdp.39015008513882. Wikidata Q133728940.
- Wright, Quincy (1965). A Study of War (revised ed.). University of Chicago Press. p. 1542. ISBN 0-2269-0998-0. LCCN 65005396. OCLC 1302243754. OL 21133158M.
- de Zayas, Alfred M. (1994). A terrible Revenge: the Ethnic Cleansing of the East European Germans. New York: Palgrave Macmillan. ISBN 1-4039-7308-3. "2,111,000"
