= Hinnerk Bruhns =

French academic

Hinnerk Bruhns (born 1943 in Germany) is an emeritus research professor at the CNRS, a member of the Centre de recherches historiques (EHESS/CNRS).

== Biography ==
After he began his academic career in Ancient History at Cologne and Bochum, since his appointment (1985) as directeur de recherche au CNRS, his work mainly focuses on the historiography of the nineteenth and twentieth and the history of social sciences in Germany at the beginning of the 20th century. Many of his publications are devoted to the Historical school of national German economics, in the work of Otto Hintze and more specifically to that of Max Weber.

Franco-German and European cooperation in social sciences plays a central role in his activities, which also includes the creation of the journal Trivium, which Hinnerk Bruhns heads since 2007. After his teaching activities at the University of Cologne, Aix-en-Provence and Bochum, Hinnerk Bruhns has been teaching at the École des hautes études en sciences sociales in Paris since 1982.

== Publications ==
- Max Webers historische Sozialökonomie. L'économie de Max Weber entre histoire et sociologie. Wiesbaden: Harrassowitz Verlag, 2014.
- One language, one history ? On the uncertain future of social sciences in Europe, Portuguese Journal of Social Science, 11 (1), 2012, p. 55–69.
- [in coll. with A. Anter and P. Duran] Max Weber et la bureaucratie / Max Weber und die Bürokratie, Trivium, Revue franco-allemande de sciences humaines et sociales, n° 7 (December 2010).
- [in coll. with P. Duran] Max Weber and the Political, Max Weber Studies, vol. 1/9.2 (special issue), January/July 2009.
- [in coll. with P. Duran] Max Weber et le politique, Paris : L.G.D.J., 2009.
- [in coll. with Jean Andreau] Sociologie économique et économie de l’Antiquité : à propos de Max Weber, Cahiers du Centre de Recherches Historiques, n° 34, October 2004.
- [éd.] Histoire et économie politique en Allemagne de Gustav Schmoller à Max Weber. Nouvelles perspectives sur l’école historique de l’économie, preface by J.-Y. Grenier, texts translated by F. Laroche, Paris : Éd. de la Maison des sciences de l’homme, 2004.
- [in coll. with W. Nippel] Max Weber und die Stadt im Kulturvergleich, Göttingen: Vandenhoeck & Ruprecht, 2000 (coll. Kritische Studien zur Geschichtswissenschaft, 140).
- [in coll. with J.-M. David and W. Nippel] Die späte römische Republik – La fin de la république romaine. Un débat franco-allemand d'histoire et d'historiographie, École Française de Rome, 1997.
- [éd.] Otto Hintze : Féodalité, capitalisme et État moderne. Essais d’histoire sociale comparée, chosen and presented by H. Bruhns, Paris : Ed. de la Maison des sciences de l’homme, 1991.
- [in coll. with J. Andreau] Parenté et stratégies familiales dans l’Antiquité Romaine, actes de la table ronde des 2-4 octobre 1986 (Paris, Maison des sciences de l’homme), Rome : Palais Farnèse, 1990 (Coll. de l’École Française de Rome, 129).

== Bibliography ==
- Barbara Stambolis, Leben mit und in der Geschichte. Deutsche Historiker Jahrgang 1943. Klartext Verlag, Essen 2010.
- Page personnelle sur le site du Centre de recherches historiques
- Entrevista com Hinnerk Bruhns, Concedida a Bernardo Borges Buarque de Hollanda, Paris, 14 de dezembro de 2010, Est. Hist., Rio de Janeiro, vol. 25, nº 49, p. 209-222, janeiro-junho 2012.
- Translation of an interview conducted in German by Mareike König (Deutsches Historisches Institut) January 2013: Les langues essentielles doivent être préservées
- Présentation on Trivium
