= Paulo Pereira =

Paulo Pereira may refer to:

- Paulo Pereira (footballer) (born 1965), Brazilian football defender
- Paulo Pereira de Almeida (fl. 2005–2010), Portuguese academic
- Paulo Pereira (handballer) (born 1965), Portuguese handball coach

== See also ==
- Paulo Silas (born 1965), full name Paulo Silas do Prado Pereira, Brazilian football manager and former midfielder
- Paulo Vitor (footballer, born 1999), Paulo Vitor Fernandes Pereira, Brazilian football winger
- Paula Pereira (disambiguation)
- Pablo Pereira (disambiguation)
