= Pablo Pereira =

Pablo Pereira may refer to:

- Pablo Pereira (volleyball) (born 1974), Argentine volleyball player
- Pablo Pereira (footballer, born 1985), Uruguayan football defender
- Pablo Pereira (footballer, born 1986), Uruguayan football forward

== See also ==
- Paulo Pereira (disambiguation)
- Paula Pereira (disambiguation)
