= Paula Pereira =

Paula Pereira may refer to:

- Paula Pereira (actress) (Paula Pereira de Bulhões de Carvalho, born 1967), Brazilian actress
- Paula Beatriz Pereira (born 1988), Brazilian badminton player

== See also ==
- Paulo Pereira (disambiguation)
- Pablo Pereira (disambiguation)
