= Rüdiger Overmans =

German military historian (born 1954)

- Born: 6 April 1954 (age 72); Düsseldorf, Germany
- Education: University of the Bundeswehr Munich 1974–1977; Helmut Schmidt University Ph.D. 1986
- Occupation: Historian
- Writing career
- Notable work: Deutsche militärische Verluste im Zweiten Weltkrieg

Rüdiger Overmans (born 6 April 1954 in Düsseldorf) is a German military historian who specializes in World War II history. His book German Military Losses in World War II, which he compiled as leader of a project sponsored by the Gerda Henkel Foundation, is one of the most comprehensive works about German casualties in World War II.

== Biography ==
Overmans joined the Bundeswehr in 1972, and studied economics at the University of the Bundeswehr Munich from 1974 to 1977. He completed his Ph.D. in 1982–1986 at the University of the Federal Armed Forces Hamburg, now known as Helmut Schmidt University. From 1987 to 2004 he was a research associate at the Military History Research Office (MGFA), first in Freiburg and later in Potsdam. In 1996, he received his doctorate in history with the seminal work German Military Losses in World War II at the University of Freiburg. This study was first published in 1999 in Munich by Oldenbourg Verlag. From 1996 to 2001, Overmans lectured at the History Department of the University of Freiburg. Until his retirement in 2004, he had reached the military rank of lieutenant colonel. Since then, he has worked as a freelance historian. He participated in a commission which issued an opinion to the number of victims in the Dresden bombing in February 1945.

== Works ==
Main works by Overmans include:

=== Monographs ===
- Deutsche militärische Verluste im Zweiten Weltkrieg [German Military Losses in World War II]. Oldenbourg, München. 2004. ISBN 3-486-20028-3.
- Soldaten hinter Stacheldraht. Deutsche Kriegsgefangene des Zweiten Weltkriegs [Soldiers behind barbed wire. German prisoners of war of World War II]. Propyläen, Berlin. 2000. ISBN 3-549-07121-3.

=== Chapters ===
- Jörg Echternkamp, ed. (2005). "Die Kriegsgefangenenpolitik des Deutschen Reiches 1939 bis 1945". Die Deutsche Kriegsgesellschaft 1939–1945. Zweiter Halbband: Ausbeutung, Deutungen, Ausgrenzung [German Wartime Society 1939-1945: Exploitation, Interpretations, Exclusion]. Germany and the Second World War. Vol. IX. Deutsche Verlagsanstalt, München. pp. 729–875. ISBN 3-421-06528-4. Jörg Echternkamp
- Rolf-Dieter Müller, ed. (2008). "Das Schicksal der deutschen Kriegsgefangenen des Zweiten Weltkriegs'". Der Zusammenbruch des Deutschen Reiches 1945. Zweiter Halbband: Die Folgen des Zweiten Weltkrieges [The Collapse of Germany 1945 and the Results of the Second World War: The Resolution of the Wehrmacht and the Consequences of the War]. Germany and the Second World War. Vol. X/1-2. Deutsche Verlagsanstalt, München. pp. 379–507. ISBN 978-3-421-04338-2.

=== Editorships ===
- In der Hand des Feindes. Kriegsgefangenschaft von der Antike bis zum Zweiten Weltkrieg. Böhlau, Köln. 1999. ISBN 3-412-14998-5.
- Overmans, Rüdiger; Bischof, Günter (1999). Kriegsgefangenschaft im Zweiten Weltkrieg. Eine vergleichende Perspektive. Gerhard Höller, Ternitz-Pottschach. ISBN 3-85226-078-7.
- Polian, Pavel; Hilger, Andreas; Overmans, Rüdiger (2012). Rotarmisten in deutscher Hand. Dokumente zu Gefangenschaft, Repatriierung und Rehabilitierung sowjetischer Soldaten des Zweiten Weltkrieges. Schöningh, Paderborn. ISBN 978-3-506-76545-1.

== See also ==
- German casualties in World War II, largely based on Overmans's research
