= Peter Revers =

German-Austrian musicologist and university teacher

Peter Revers (born 1954) is a German-Austrian musicologist and university lecturer at the University of Music and Performing Arts Graz.

== Life ==
Born in Würzburg, Revers is the son of the psychologist Wilhelm Josef Revers. He studied musicology, psychology, philosophy and music composition at the Paris-Lodron-University, the Mozarteum Salzburg and University of Vienna. He received his doctorate in 1980 and also his artistic diploma in 1981. From 1981 to 1996 he was assistant-professor, lecturer and guest professor at the Vienna and Graz Universities of Music, but also worked at the universities of Salzburg and Hamburg. In 1988/1989 he was granted a research fellowship by the Alexander von Humboldt Foundation at University of Hamburg, where he also habilitated in 1993. Revers is married to the pianist and university professor Lucy Revers-Chin since 1982.

Since 1996 Revers has been full professor for music history at the Kunstuniversität Graz. From 2001 to 2009 he was president of the Austrian Society for Musicology, and from 2017 - 2021 President of the International Gustav Mahler-Society. His research interests include Gustav Mahler, Jean Sibelius, Mozart, the music of the 18th to 21st centuries, but also the reception of East Asia in the history of western music. Since October 2022 Revers is Prof. emeritus.

== Publication ==
- Friedrich C. Heller/Peter Revers: Das Wiener Konzerthaus. Geschichte und Bedeutung, Vienna 1983.
- Gustav Mahler – Untersuchungen zu den späten Sinfonien. Hamburg 1985.
- Das Fremde und das Vertraute. Studien zur musiktheoretischen und musikdra-matischen Ostasienrezeption (Beihefte zum Archiv für Musikwissenschaft XLI), Stuttgart 1997.
- Mahlers Lieder, Munich 2000 (Verlag C.H. Beck).
- Gegenwart und Zukunft der wissenschaftlichen Nachwuchsförderung, ed. by Josef Ehmer, Dietmar Goltschnigg, Peter Revers and Justin Stagl, Vienna 2003.
- Harry…Heinrich…Henri…Heine: Deutscher – Jude – Europäer, ed. by Dietmar Goltschnigg, Charlotte Grollegg-Edler and Peter Revers, Berlin (Erich Schmied) 2008.
- Gustav Mahler – Interpretationen seiner Werke, edited by Peter Revers and Oliver Korte, 2 volS., Laaber 2011
- Mahlers Sinfonien, Munich 2020 (Verlag: C.H. Beck)
