= Josef Ehmer =

Austrian historian (1948–2023)

Josef Ehmer (7 November 1948 – 10 May 2023) was an Austrian historian and professor emeritus at the University of Vienna.

== Education and academic career ==
Ehmer was born in Gschwandt on 7 November 1948. After attending elementary & secondary school in Upper Austria, Josef Ehmer studied history and German studies at the University of Vienna, where he obtained his doctorate in 1976. He then worked as a research assistant at the Department of Social and Economic History at the University of Vienna. In 1989, he habilitated and qualified as a lecturer. In 1993, he received a professorship at the University of Salzburg where he taught modern history. In 2005, he returned to the University of Vienna as professor of social and economic history. At both universities he was a member of the Academic Senate. From 2005 to 2014 Josef Ehmer was speaker for the historical sciences on the board of the Austrian Science Fund (FWF) and a board member of HERA - Humanities in the European Research Area.

Ehmer's academic career path included numerous research stays abroad. 1974–1975, he received a Ph.D. grant from the Deutscher Akademischer Austauschdienst (DAAD) for LMU Munich; 1984–1986, a scholarship from the Alexander von Humboldt-Foundation at the Max-Planck-Institute for History in Göttingen. He was visiting professor at the Free University Berlin (1990-91) and at the European University Institute in Florence (1997–1998 and 2002–2003). He maintained a close relationship with the Cambridge Group for the History of Population and Social Structure, which he visited regularly from 1978 to 1989, and was a visiting scholar at the Centre for Quantitative Economic History at Cambridge University in spring 2008. From 2009 he was an associate fellow at and a regular visitor to the International Research Centre “Work and Human Lifecycle in Global History” at Humboldt-University Berlin.

== Fields of research ==
Josef Ehmer's research fields included a broad spectrum of topics in social history, such as family and life course; work, workers and labour movements; artisans and petty commodity production; migrations; old age and ageing; population history and historical demography. His basic interests were in the long-term change of these phenomena from early modern times until the present in a European comparative perspective. He was particularly interested in non-linear historical developments, in the interaction of and friction among old and new historical formations, and in the persistence and usability of old institutions and behavioural patterns under new social and economic conditions. These basic interests were already clearly expressed in his Ph.D. dissertation (revised printed version 1980) and in his Habilitation (revised printed version 1991) and is still very much evident in later publications.

As many of these interests were closely related to social sciences and cultural studies, Josef Ehmer was strongly committed to interdisciplinary cooperation. Most notably, he was a member of the Joint Academy Initiative on Ageing (German Academy of Sciences Leopoldina, 2005–2009) and of the Interdisciplinary Workgroup “A Future with Children. Fertility and the Development of Society” (Berlin-Brandenburg Academy of Sciences and Humanities, 2009-2011). From 2012 he was a member of the Standing Committee on Demographic Change at the German National Academy of Sciences Leopoldina.

== Social and political commitment ==
Josef Ehmer grew up in a blue-collar working-class family. His parents, Maria (1910–1992) and Josef (1905–1975), were in the Communist resistance movement against Austro-Fascism and National Socialism, and experienced severe persecution. As a student at the University of Vienna, Josef Ehmer participated in leftist student movements; in the early 1970s, he co-founded the Kommunistischer StudentInnenverband (KSV). As an assistant professor, he was actively involved in university teachers’ unions. He was a member of the Communist Party of Austria (KPÖ) and of the party's Historical Commission. In the late 1980s, he belonged to a group of reformers within the KPÖ who tried “to overcome Stalinist structures and traditions” and to replace the party with a “new leftist formation”. After this endeavour failed, Josef Ehmer resigned from the KPÖ and distanced himself from all variants of communism. Since that time, the focus of his social activism has been on extramural civic initiatives. Among other commitments, he was chairman of the board of the “Edith Saurer Fund for sponsoring projects in the field of historical research” (ESF) and for many years served as a board member of ITH (International Conference of Labour and Social History).

== Death ==
Ehmer died on 10 May 2023, at the age of 74.

== Honours and awards ==
- Dr. Theodor-Körner-Preis zur Förderung der Wissenschaft (Vienna, 1980)
- Heinz-Maier-Leibnitz-Preis des Bundesministers für Bildung und Wissenschaft der Bundesrepublik Deutschland für Veröffentlichungen junger Wissenschaftler auf dem Gebiet der Historischen Jugend- und Familienforschung (Bonn, 1984)
- Victor Adler-Staatspreis für die Geschichte sozialer Bewegungen (Vienna, 1995)

== Publications ==
Monographs

- Bevölkerungsgeschichte und historische Demographie. 1800–2000 (Enzyklopädie deutscher Geschichte. 71). Oldenbourg, Munich 2004, ISBN 3-486-55732-7.
- Heiratsverhalten, Sozialstruktur, ökonomischer Wandel. England und Mitteleuropa in der Formationsperiode des Kapitalismus (Kritische Studien zur Geschichtswissenschaft. 92). Vandenhoeck & Ruprecht, Göttingen 1991, ISBN 3-525-35755-9.
- Sozialgeschichte des Alters (Suhrkamp Verlag. 1541 = NF 541). Frankfurt, 1990, ISBN 3-518-11541-3.

As publisher

- with Ursula Ferdinand and Jürgen Reulecke: Herausforderung Bevölkerung. Zu Entwicklungen des modernen Denkens über die Bevölkerung vor, im und nach dem "Dritten Reich“. VS – Verlag für Sozialwissenschaften, Wiesbaden 2007, ISBN 978-3-531-15556-2.
- with Dietmar Goltschnigg, Peter Revers and Justin Stagl: Förderung des wissenschaftlichen Nachwuchses. Bestandsaufnahmen und Zukunftsaussichten. Edition Praesens, Vienna 2004, ISBN 3-7069-0186-2.
- with Helga Grebing and Peter Gutschner: Arbeit. Geschichte – Gegenwart – Zukunft. (ITH-Tagungsberichte. 36). AVA – Akademische Verlags-Anstalt, Leipzig 2002, ISBN 3-931982-28-9.
- with Peter Gutschner: Das Alter im Spiel der Generationen. Historische und sozialwissenschaftliche Beiträge. Böhlau, Vienna among others. 2000, ISBN 3-205-99157-5.
- with Tamara K. Hareven and Richard Wall: Historische Familienforschung. Ergebnisse und Kontroversen. Michael Mitterauer zum 60. Geburtstag. Campus, Frankfurt among others. 1997, ISBN 3-593-35753-4.
