= Paulo Pereira de Almeida =

Portuguese academic

Paulo Pereira de Almeida, Ph.D. (ISCTE) is a Portuguese academic. He is a professor at ISCTE in the areas of Organization and Management of Business, Labor and Internationalization Business.

== Biography ==
His positions include: Professor at the Universidade Nova in the areas of security and defence in the Masters in Advanced Studies in Law and Security, which provides the Certificate of Auditor of Internal Security; Coordinator of Masters and Post-graduate in the areas of Employment and Economic Diplomacy. Coordinator of several applied research projects; and advisor to national and international companies. He is the author of several publications and regular contributor of newspapers and magazines. He is a founder and member of the editorial board of the journal Security and Defence. He is also Vice President of ITD-Transatlantic Democratic Institute and the Centre for Security, Organized Crime and Terrorism.

He conducted a study on victimization and perceptions of personal safety in Portugal, “A vitimação em Portugal” (Victimization in Portugal), which found that 70.5 of respondents felt safe in the areas where they live.

== Publications ==
=== Journal articles ===
- 2008 “Segurança e Resposta a Crises: análise ao caso dos EUA”, artigo na revista Segurança e Defesa, n.º 7, pp. 109–111.
- 2006 “A estratégia de defesa dos Estados Unidos da América no Mundo”, artigo na revista Segurança e Defesa, n.º 1, pp. 3–8.
- 2006 “Estratégias e Segurança dos Estados Unidos da América na Relação Transatlântica: a concertação necessária”, artigo na revista Finisterra, n.ºs 53–54, pp. 49–54.
- 2005 “The ‘servicelization’ of societies: towards new paradigms in work organization”, artigo na revista Portuguese Journal of Social Science, vol. 4, n.º 2, pp. 63–79.

=== Books ===
- 2008 “Um Mundo Perigoso: segurança e informações no século XXI”.
- 2005 “Trabalho, Serviço e Serviços”.
- 2005 “A Era da Competência”.
