= Jürgen Reulecke =

German historian and emeritus professor

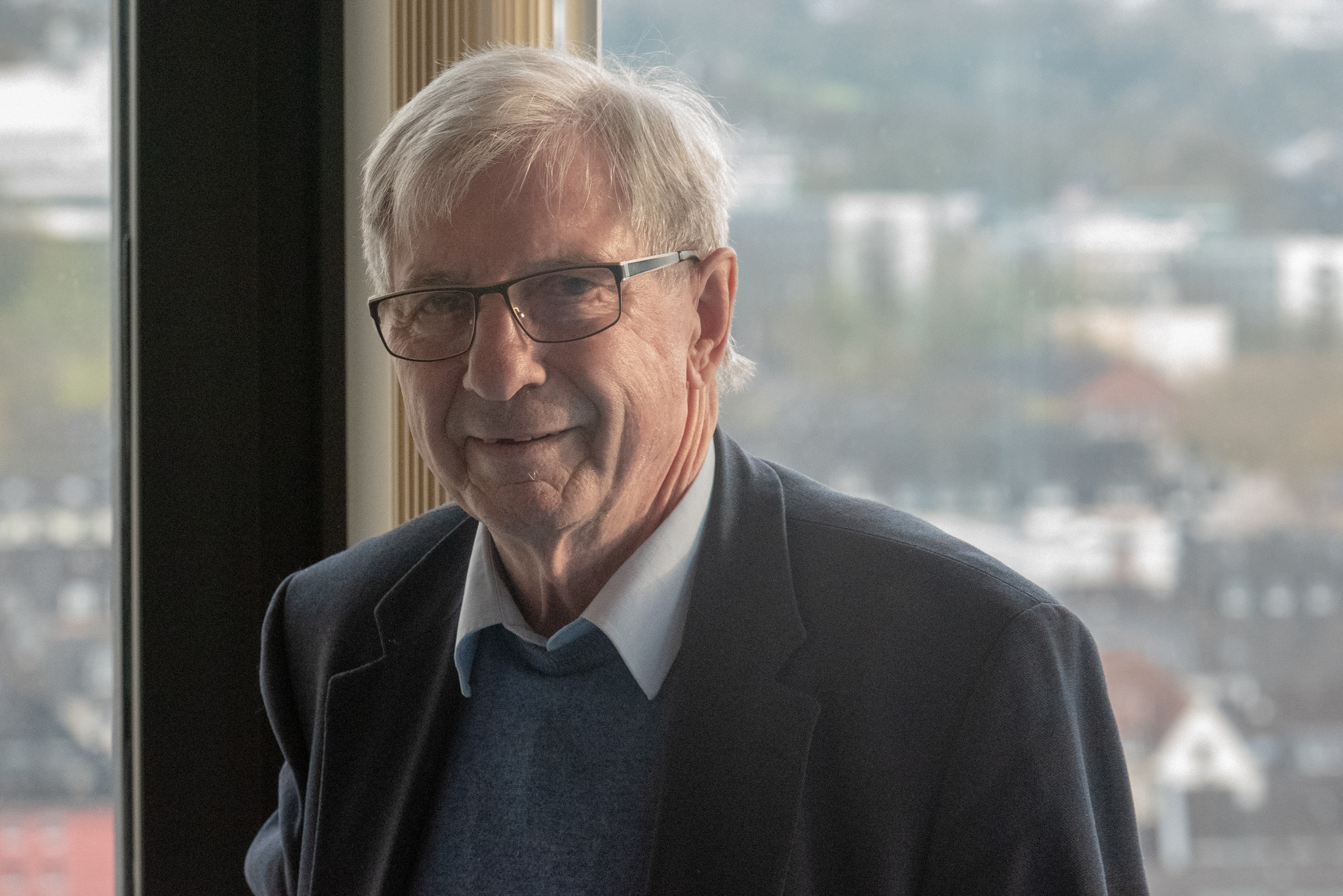
Jürgen Reulecke (2019)

Jürgen Reulecke (born 12 February 1940) is a German historian and emeritus professor.

== Life ==
Born in Düsseldorf, in his childhood Reulecke was a member of a catholic boys' group. He studied history, German Studies and philosophy at the universities of Münster, Bonn and Bochum. In 1972 he received his doctorate under Wolfgang Köllmann and in 1979 his habilitation. From 1984 to 2003 he was professor of modern and contemporary history at the University of Siegen. During the academic year, Reulecke was a research fellow at the Historisches Kolleg in Munich. Since 2003 he has taught at the University of Giessen and was spokesperson of the special research area "Memory Cultures". He is a member of the PEN Centre Germany.

In 1985 Reulecke was elected as a full member of the Historical Commission for Westphalia.

== Research ==
Reulecke's research focuses on social history, especially the illumination of the youth movement. He has also distinguished himself as an urbanization historian.

== Publications ==
- Eine junge Generation im Schützengraben: "Der Wanderer zwischen beiden Welten" by Walter Flex. In Dirk van Laak: Literatur, die Geschichte schrieb. Vandenhoeck & Ruprecht, Göttingen 2011, ISBN 978-3-525-30015-2
- Bergische Miniaturen.: Geschichten und Erfahrungen Klartext Verlag, Essen 2010
- 100 Jahre Jugendherbergen 1909–2009. (together with Barbara Stambolis). Klartext, Essen 2009.
- Kriegskinder in Ostdeutschland und Polen, vbb, Verlag für Berlin-Brandenburg, 2008
- Wissenschaften im 20. Jahrhundert. Steiner, Stuttgart 2008
- Söhne ohne Väter. Chr. Links, Berlin 2004
- (ed.): Generationalität und Lebensgeschichte im 20. Jahrhundert (Schriften des Historischen Kollegs. Kolloquien 58). Munich 2003, ISBN 978-3-486-56747-2 (Numerised).
- Das Ruhrgebiet und die „Volksgesundheit“., Essen 2001
- Rückkehr in die Ferne. Juventa, Weinheim 1997
- Spagat mit Kopftuch. Ed. Körber-Stiftung, Hamburg 1997
- Geschichte der Urbanisierung in Deutschland, Suhrkamp, Frankfurt am Main 1992
- as editor with Diethart Kerbs: Handbuch der deutschen Reformbewegungen 1880–1933. Wuppertal 1998.
