= Melvin Small =

American historian (born 1939)

- Born: March 14, 1939 (age 87); New York City, U.S.

Academic background
- Education: Dartmouth College (BA); University of Michigan (PhD)

Academic work
- Discipline: History
- Sub-discipline: Post-war era American foreign policy Public opinion Vietnam War; Antiwar movement
- Institutions: Wayne State University

Melvin Small (born March 14, 1939, in New York City) is an American academic working as a distinguished professor emeritus of history at Wayne State University in Detroit.

== Education ==
Small earned a Bachelor of Arts from Dartmouth College in 1960 and Ph.D. from the University of Michigan in 1965.

== Career ==
He taught at Wayne State University from 1965 to 2010 and was a visiting professor at the University of Michigan, Marygrove College, the University of Windsor (Canada) and Aarhus University (Denmark). In 1969–1970, he was a fellow at the Center for Advanced Study in the Behavioral Sciences.

Small has concentrated his research and writing on the post-war era, with an emphasis on the Vietnam War, the antiwar movement, and presidents Johnson and Nixon. A historian of American foreign policy, he studies public opinion, domestic politics and foreign policy, a subject reflected in his monographs and several theoretical articles. He was a co-investigator on the quantitative IR project, the Correlates of War, WSU's NCAA faculty advisor, and department chair. He also worked as a restaurant reviewer for the Metro Times.

A former president of the Peace History Society, Small has written or edited fifteen books, including Johnson, Nixon and the Doves (1988), Democracy and Diplomacy (1996), The Presidency of Richard Nixon (1999), Antiwarriors (2002), and At the Water's Edge (2005).
