= Pablo Pereira (footballer, born 1985) =

Uruguayan footballer

Personal information
- Full name: Pablo Andrés Pereira Errandonea
- Date of birth: 24 April 1985 (age 41)
- Place of birth: Montevideo, Uruguay
- Height: 1.86 m (6 ft 1 in)
- Position: Centre-back

Team information
- Current team: Celaya (Assistant)

Youth career
- 2000–2001: Defensor Sporting
- 2001–2006: Liverpool Montevideo

Senior career*
Years	Team	Apps	(Gls)
2006–2007	Liverpool Montevideo	12	(0)
2008	Huracán Buceo	0	(0)
2008–2009	Rampla Juniors	14	(1)
2009	Fénix	2	(0)
2010	Juventud Las Piedras	0	(0)
2010	Ferro Carril Oeste	0	(0)
2011	Central Español	0	(0)
2011	Fénix	10	(0)
2011–2012	Liverpool Montevideo	25	(4)
2012	Correcaminos UAT	10	(0)
2013	Central Español	10	(0)
2013–2015	Rampla Juniors	36	(2)
2016	Liverpool Montevideo	15	(0)
2017–2019	Miramar Misiones	43	(1)
Total		177	(8)

Managerial career
- 2021: Boston River (assistant)
- 2022: Liverpool Montevideo (youth)
- 2022–2023: Montevideo Wanderers (Assistant)
- 2024–: Celaya (Assistant)
- * Club domestic league appearances and goals

Pablo Andrés Pereira Errandonea (born April 24, 1985, in Montevideo, Uruguay) is a Uruguayan football manager and former player who played as a centre-back. He currently works for the Liverpool Montevideo youth ranks.

== Playing career ==
A product of both Defensor Sporting and Liverpool, Pereira spend the most part of his career in the Uruguayan football.

Abroad, he played for Ferro Carril Oeste in Argentina and Correcaminos UAT in Mexico.

== Managerial career ==
Pereira began to coach club Old Ivy Club in 2017 at the same time he was a football player. In 2021, he was the assistant coach in Boston River. In 2022, he joined Liverpool Montevideo as coach of the youth ranks.
