= Portuguese Journal of Social Science =

- Discipline: Social sciences
- Language: English
- Edited by: Luis Nuno Rodrigues

Publication details
- History: 2002-present
- Publisher: ISCTE – Lisbon University Institute (Portugal)
- Frequency: Triannually

Standard abbreviations
- ISO 4: Port. J. Soc. Sci.

Indexing
- ISSN: 1476-413X
- OCLC no.: 55969761

Links
- Journal homepage

The Portuguese Journal of Social Science is a triannual peer-reviewed academic journal published by ISCTE – Lisbon University Institute. It covers research by Portuguese scholars or which concerns Portugal or is being conducted as part of a project involving Portuguese institutions and organizations. Preference is given to the publication of original work, although the journal may publish exceptional work that has previously been published in languages other than English.
