= Barbara Stambolis =

German historian of modern age

Barbara Stambolis (born 1952 in Kiel) is a German historian and university lecturer.

From 1971, Stambolis studied history and German studies at the Christian-Albrechts-Universität and the Ruhr University Bochum. She received her doctorate in 1982 with Hans Mommsen as Doctor of Philosophy. Habilitated Privatdozent since 1999, in 2006, she was appointed associate professor for new and modern history by the Paderborn University.

Her publications deal with fields of research in cultural, mental and social history (youth and generational history, childhood in the Second World War, religious festive culture, gender history).

== Publications ==
- Luise Hensel (1798–1876). Frauenleben in historischen Umbruchszeiten. Cologne 1999, ISBN 978-3-89498-054-2
- Mythos Jugend – Leitbild und Krisensymptom: ein Aspekt der politischen Kultur im 20. Jahrhundert, Schwalbach/Ts.: Wochenschau-Verl. 2003, ISBN 3-87920-191-9
- Kriegskinder: zwischen Hitlerjugend und Nachkriegsalltag (edited with Volker Jakob), Münster: Agenda-Verl. 2006, ISBN 978-3-89688-290-5
- Leben mit und in der Geschichte. Deutsche Historiker Jahrgang 1943. Essen 2010, ISBN 9783898619356
- Töchter ohne Väter: Frauen der Kriegsgeneration und ihre lebenslange Sehnsucht. Stuttgart 2012, ISBN 978-3-608-94724-3
