= Allied plans for German industry after World War II =

Overview of the plans by the Allies for Germany's industry after World War II

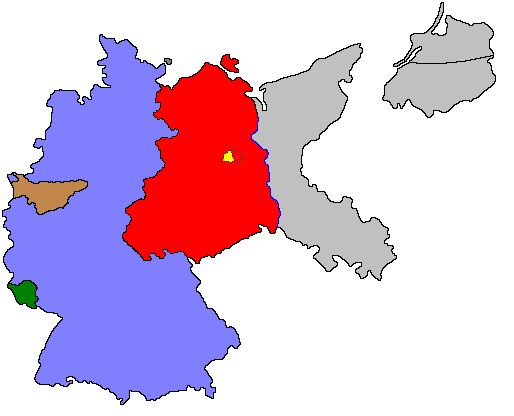
Borders of post-World War II Germany (1949). West Germany is shown in blue, East Germany is shown in red, the Saar protectorate under French economic control is shown in green. The Ruhr Area, the industrial engine of West Germany, is shown in brown as it was to some extent under the control of the International Authority for the Ruhr. Pre-war German territory east of the Oder-Neisse line is shown in gray, because it was assigned to Poland or annexed by the Soviet Union. This included Silesia, Germany's second-largest industrial center after the Ruhr. West Berlin is shown in yellow.

In the aftermath of World War II, the victorious Allies of World War II developed industrial plans for Germany which would be imposed to reduce and manage Germany's industrial capacity.

== Background ==
At the Potsdam Conference (July–August 1945), with the US seeking to implement the Morgenthau plan, drawn up by Henry Morgenthau Jr., the United States Secretary of the Treasury, the victorious Allies decided to abolish the German armed forces as well as all munitions factories and civilian industries that could support them. This included the destruction of all ship- and aircraft-manufacturing capability. Further, the victors decided that civilian industries that might have military potential were to be restricted. The restriction of the latter was calibrated with Germany's "approved peacetime needs", which were defined based on the average European standard. In order to achieve this, each type of industry was subsequently reviewed to see how many factories Germany required under these minimum level-of-industry requirements.

== Level of industry plans ==
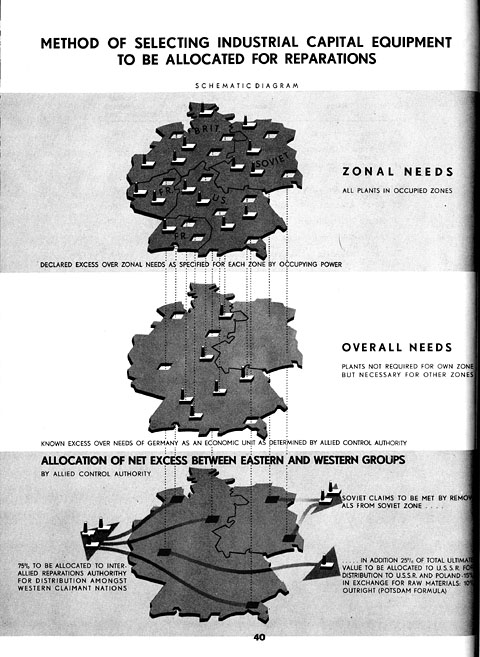
Allocation policy for "surplus" German heavy industry

The first "level of industry" plan, signed by the Allies on March 29, 1946, stated that German heavy industry was to be lowered to 50% of its 1938 levels by the destruction of 1,500 listed manufacturing plants. In January 1946 the Allied Control Council set the foundation of the future German economy by putting a cap on German steel production capacity: the maximum allowed was set at about 5,800,000 tons of steel a year, equivalent to 25% of the prewar production level. The UK, in whose occupation zone most of the steel production was located, had argued for a less-limited reduction of 12 million tons of steel per year, but had to submit to the will of the US, France, and the Soviet Union (which had argued for a limit of 3 million tons). Steel plants thus made redundant were to be dismantled. Germany was to be reduced to the standard of living it had known at the height of the Great Depression (1932). Car production was set to 10% of prewar levels, etc.

On February 2, 1946, a dispatch from Berlin reported:

Some progress has been made in converting Germany to an agricultural and light industry economy, said Brigadier General William Henry Draper Jr., chief of the American Economics Division, who emphasized that there was general agreement on that plan.

He explained that Germany's future industrial and economic pattern was being drawn for a population of 66,500,000. On that basis, he said, the nation will need large imports of food and raw materials to maintain a minimum standard of living.

General agreement, he continued, had been reached on the types of German exports — coal, coke, electrical equipment, leather goods, beer, wines, spirits, toys, musical instruments, textiles and apparel — to take the place of the heavy industrial products which formed most of Germany's pre-war exports.

Timber exports from the US occupation zone were particularly heavy. Sources in the US government admitted that the purpose of this was the "ultimate destruction of the war potential of German forests." Extensive deforestation due to clear-felling resulted in a situation which could "be replaced only by long forestry development over perhaps a century.". E. J. Bryce noted in March 1948 that "At the present rate of deforestation the resources of the British Zone will be exhausted within a very few years."

The first plan was subsequently followed by a number of new ones, the last signed in 1949. By 1950, after the virtual completion of the by-then much watered-down "level of industry" plans, equipment had been removed from 706 manufacturing plants in the west and steel production capacity had been reduced by 6,700,000 tons.

== Moderation of policy ==
Beginning in mid-1946 American and British policy towards the German economy began to change, illustrated by Byrnes's September speech restatement of policy on Germany (also known as the "Stuttgart speech" or "Speech of hope"). According to Dennis L. Bark and David R. Gress in A History of West Germany the Morgenthau Plan came to be seen as inflicting undue hardship, and so the approach was shifted, over time, to one encouraging German economic expansion. As part of this, the allowed levels of industrial capacity were raised.

According to Vladimir Petrov in Money and Conquest: Allied Occupation Currencies in World War II the reason for the change in US occupation policy was almost exclusively based on economic considerations. Although a large part of the occupation costs were placed on the German economy, the US and the UK were increasingly forced to supply food imports to prevent mass starvation. According to some historians the US government abandoned the Morgenthau Plan as policy in September 1946 with Secretary of State James F. Byrnes' speech Restatement of Policy on Germany. Others have argued that credit should be given to former US President Herbert Hoover who in one of his reports from Germany in 1947 argued for a change in occupation policy, amongst other things stating:

There is the illusion that the New Germany left after the annexations can be reduced to a "pastoral state". It cannot be done unless we exterminate or move 25,000,000 people out of it.

Worries about the sluggish recovery of the European economy (which before the war was driven by the German industrial base) and growing Soviet influence amongst a German population subject to food shortages and economic misery, caused the Joint Chiefs of Staff, and Generals Clay and Marshall to start lobbying the Truman administration for a change of policy. General Clay commissioned several expert studies about necessary changes in German economy and stated

There is no choice between being a communist on 1,500 calories a day and a believer in democracy on a thousand.

In July 1947, President Harry S. Truman rescinded on "national security grounds" the punitive occupation directive JCS 1067, which had directed the US forces of occupation in Germany to "take no steps looking toward the economic rehabilitation of Germany [or] designed to maintain or strengthen the German economy." It was replaced by JCS 1779, which instead noted that "[a]n orderly, prosperous Europe requires the economic contributions of a stable and productive Germany." Nevertheless, General Clay needed over two months to overcome continued resistance among his staff to the new directive, but on July 10, 1947, it was finally approved at a meeting of the SWNCC. The final version of the document "was purged of the most important elements of the Morgenthau Plan."

The restrictions placed on German heavy industry production were thus partly ameliorated, as permitted steel production levels were raised from 25% of pre-war capacity to a new limit placed at 50% of pre-war capacity.

== Economic consequences ==
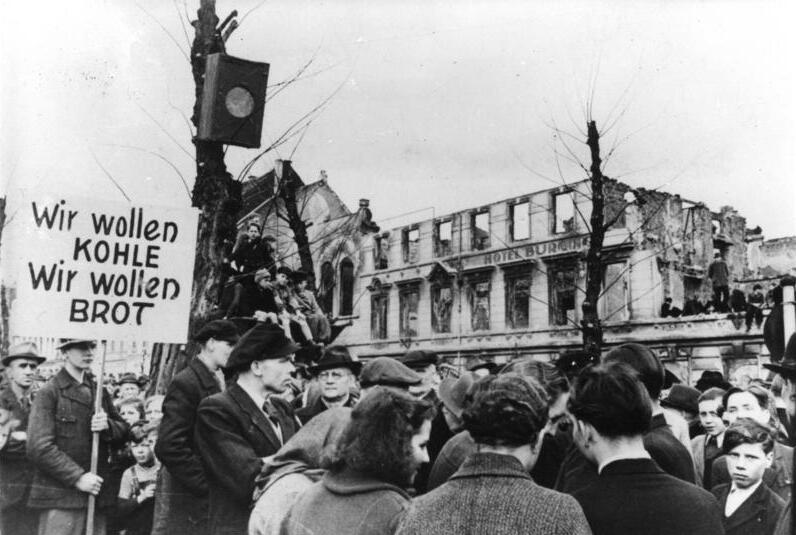
The "hunger winter" of 1947: Thousands protest against the disastrous food situation (March 31, 1947).

The reduction in steel production that resulted from the first and the second level of industry plans meant that a steel production bottleneck ensued which forced other parts of German industry to fall below their own permitted production levels. The economy of the Bizone finally hit rock bottom early in 1948 as a consequence of this.

Compounding the problems in the steel industry and their effects on the German economy as a whole was the prohibition against importing high-grade Swedish iron ore. Until that was lifted in 1948, German steel plants had to rely on low-quality local ore which required almost twice the amount of coal to process. Moreover, the Germans were also forced to sell their steel at wartime prices until April 1, 1948, which meant large losses for the industry. Additionally, attempts to "decartelize" the German steel industry also contributed to the low output.

The Allied Control Council set the price for German coal at half what it cost to produce it. From May 1945 until September 1947 the US, UK, and France exported German coal for $10.50/tonne, while the world price hovered closer to $25–$30 per tonne. During this period the Allies thus took roughly $200,000,000 out of the German economy from this source alone. In September 1947 the export price was raised but remained set at $5–$7 below world-market prices.

In Germany the shortage of food was an acute problem. According to the UNRRA in 1946–47 the average kilocalorie intake per day was estimated to be 1,080, which according to Alan S. Milward was an amount insufficient for long-term health. Other sources state that the kilocalorie intake in those years varied between as low as 1,000 and 1,500. William L. Clayton reported to Washington that "millions of people are slowly starving."

Germany received many offers from Western European nations to trade food for desperately needed coal and steel. Neither the Italians nor the Dutch could sell the vegetables that they had previously sold in Germany, with the consequence that the Dutch had to destroy considerable proportions of their crop. Denmark offered 150 tons of lard a month; Turkey offered hazelnuts; Norway offered fish and fish oil; Sweden offered considerable amounts of fats. However, the Allies disallowed the Germans to trade.

The UNRRA charter allowed it to operate in Germany to assist non-ethnic German displaced persons, but did not permit it to assist ethnic Germans. In 1948, after three years of occupation, the combined US and UK expenditure on relief food in Germany through GARIOA and other means stood at a total of close to $1.5 billion (that were charged to the Germans). Still, according to Nicholas Balabkins, German food rations were deficient in composition and remained far below recommended minimum nutrition levels. Officials in authority admitted that the distributed rations "represented a fairly rapid starvation level". (see also American food policy in occupied Germany).

== Reparations and exploitation ==
The Allies confiscated large amounts of German intellectual property (patents and copyrights, but also trademarks). Beginning immediately after the German surrender and continuing for the next two years the US pursued a vigorous program to harvest all technological and scientific know-how as well as all patents in Germany. John Gimbel comes to the conclusion, in his book Science Technology and Reparations: Exploitation and Plunder in Postwar Germany, that the "intellectual reparations" taken by the US (and the UK) amounted to close to $10 billion. (Compared to America's 1948 GDP of $258 billion and total Marshall plan expenditure (1948-1952) of $13 billion, of which Germany received $1 billion in loans and $400 million as a grant). The US competitors of German firms were encouraged by the occupation authorities to access all records and facilities. In 1947 the director of the US Commerce Department's Office of Technical Services stated before congress:

"The fundamental justification of this activity is that we won the war and the Germans did not. If the Germans had won the war, they would be over here in Schenectady and Chicago and Detroit and Pittsburgh, doing the same things."

A German report from May 1, 1949, stated that many entrepreneurs preferred not to do research under the current regulations (Allied Control Council Law No. 25) for fear of the research directly profiting their competitors. The law required detailed reporting to the Allies of all research results.

The patents, drawings and physical equipment taken in Germany included such items (or drawings for) as electron microscopes, cosmetics, textile machinery, tape recorders, insecticides, a unique chocolate-wrapping machine, a continuous butter-making machine, a manure spreader, ice skate grinders, paper napkin machines, "and other technologies — almost all of which were either new to American industry or 'far superior' to anything in use in the United States."

The British took commercial secrets too, by abducting German scientists and technicians, or simply by interning German businessmen if they refused to reveal trade secrets.

Konrad Adenauer stated:

According to a statement made by an American expert, the patents formerly belonging to IG Farben have given the American chemical industry a lead of at least 10 years. The damage thus caused to the German economy is huge and cannot be assessed in figures. It is extraordinarily regrettable that the new German inventions cannot be protected either, because Germany is not a member of the Patent Union. Britain has declared that it will respect German inventions regardless of what the peace treaty may say. But America has refused to issue such a declaration. German inventors are therefore not in a position to exploit their own inventions. This puts a considerable brake on German economic development.

In JCS 1067 there were provisions allowing German scientists be detained for intelligence purposes as required. Although the original focus on the exploitation was towards military means, much of the information collected by FIAT was quickly adapted commercially to the degree that the Office of the Assistant Secretary of State for Occupied Areas requested that the peace treaty with Germany be redacted to protect US industry from lawsuits.

The US made no attempt to evaluate the value of what was taken from Germany, and in the contracts that led to sovereignty for West Germany in 1955 the West Germans had to formally renounce all claims to possible compensation for all types of assets taken, including scientific and technical know-how. Gimbel notes that this made a later accounting practically impossible.

The property taken in Germany was without regard to the rules of the Hague Convention, which prohibits the seizure of enemy private property "unless it is susceptible of direct military use", but there are legal arguments that the Allied occupation of Germany was not bound by Hague Conventions, because if the German state no longer existed (see debellatio), and the convention only applied to the occupation of territory belonging to one of the Contracting Powers then it did not cover the territories of Germany post war. The legal status of Germany under occupation is however unclear, particularly as debellatio in general involves the complete dissolution and annexation of the defeated state, which did not take place and indeed in the Berlin Declaration (1945) it was categorically denied that Germany was annexed. However, the eastern quarter of Germany was later annexed and its German inhabitants expelled.

== Marshall plan ==
With the Western Allies eventually becoming concerned about the deteriorating economic situation in their "Trizone"; the US Marshall Plan of economic aid to Europe was extended also to Western Germany in 1948 and a currency reform, which had been prohibited under the occupation directive JCS 1067, introduced the Deutsche Mark and halted rampant inflation.

== The Ruhr ==
The Ruhr lay within the British occupation zone in Germany after the war had ended. The Ruhr Agreement was imposed on the Germans as a condition for permitting them to establish the Federal Republic of Germany. By controlling the production and distribution of coal and steel (i.e. how much coal and steel the Germans themselves would get), the International Authority for the Ruhr in effect controlled the entire West German economy, much to the dismay of the Germans. They were however permitted to send their delegations to the authority after the Petersberg agreement. With the West German agreement to join the European Coal and Steel Community in order to lift the restrictions imposed by the IAR, thus also ensuring French security by perpetuating French access to Ruhr coal, the role of the IAR was taken over by the ECSC.

== The Saar ==
With U.S permission, as for example given in the Stuttgart speech, France expanded the borders of the Saarland by adding parts of the Rhineland and thereafter detached it as a protectorate in 1947. This was done as the Saarland served as Germany's second largest remaining source of coal, and its detachment was therefore necessary in order to curtail German industrial capability. The area was integrated into the French economy, and although nominally politically independent, its security and foreign policies were decided in Paris, which also maintained a High Commissioner with wide-ranging powers in the protectorate.

== The Soviet Union ==
In accordance with the agreements with the USSR shipment of dismantled German industrial installations from the west began on March 31, 1946. By August 1947 11,100 tons of equipment (including great parts of the railway tracks) had been shipped east as reparations to the Soviet Union.

Under the terms of the agreement the Soviet Union would in return ship raw materials such as food and timber to the western zones. In view of the Soviet failure to do so the US temporarily halted shipments east (although they were never resumed). However, it was later shown that although the shipments stop was utilized for cold war propaganda reasons, the main reason for halting shipments east was not the behavior of the USSR but rather the recusant behavior of France.

Material sent to the U.S.S.R. included equipment from the Kugelfischer ball-bearing plant at Schweinfurt, the Daimler-Benz underground aircraft-engine plant at Obrigheim, the Deschimag shipyards at Bremen, and the Gendorf powerplant.

== End of dismantling ==
The dismantling of German industry continued, and in 1949 Konrad Adenauer wrote to the Allies requesting that it end, citing the inherent contradiction between encouraging industrial growth and removing factories, and also the unpopularity of the policy. (See also Adenauers original letter to Schuman, Ernest Bevins letter to Robert Schuman urging a reconsideration of the dismantling policy.) Support for dismantling was by this time coming predominantly from the French, and the Petersberg Agreement of November 1949 reduced the levels vastly, though dismantling of minor factories continued until 1951.

In 1951 West Germany agreed to join the European Coal and Steel Community (ECSC) the following year. This meant that some of the economic restrictions on production capacity and on actual production that were imposed by the International Authority for the Ruhr were lifted, and that its role was taken over by the ECSC.

The final limitations on German industrial levels were lifted after the European Coal and Steel Community entered into force in July 1952, though arms manufacture remained prohibited. The Allied efforts to "de-concentrate and reorganize" the German coal, iron and steel industry were also continued.

Although dismantling of West German industry ended in 1951, "industrial disarmament" lingered in restrictions on actual German steel production, and production capacity, as well as on restriction on key industries. All remaining restrictions were only lifted when the Allied occupation of West Germany ended on May 5, 1955. According to Frederick H. Gareau, noting that although US policy had changed well before that; "the last act of the Morgenthau drama occurred on that date (May 5, 1955) or when the Saar was returned to Germany (January 1, 1957)."

Vladimir Petrov concludes that the Allies "delayed by several years the economic reconstruction of the wartorn continent, a reconstruction which subsequently cost the United States billions of dollars." (see Marshall Plan)

== See also ==
- American food policy in occupied Germany
- Forced labor of Germans after World War II
- History of Germany since 1945
- History of the Ruhr District
- Marshall Plan
- Morgenthau Plan, an American plan that proposed gutting the Ruhr's industrial capacity
- Operation Osoaviakhim, USSR operation that forcibly "recruited" German specialists
- Operation Paperclip, USA operation that forcibly "recruited" German specialists
- A Report on Germany
- Soviet invasion of Manchuria where similar war looting and removal of factories occurred
- Wirtschaftswunder, the "economic miracle"
