= Legal status of Germany =

The legal status of Germany concerns the question of the extinction, or otherwise continuation according to the rules of state succession, of the German nation-state (i.e., the German Reich created in the 1871 unification) following the rise and downfall of Nazi Germany, and constitutional hiatus of the military occupation of Germany by the four Allied powers from 1945 to 1949. It became current once again when the German Democratic Republic (East Germany) joined the Federal Republic of Germany (West Germany) in 1990.

== Overview ==
After World War II, determination of legal status was relevant, for instance, to resolve the issue of whether the post-1949 Federal Republic of Germany (West Germany) would be the successor state of the pre-1945 German Reich, and thus carry forward its position as a subject of international law, or whether it would be a state established anew. This was important for such questions as whether and how Germany might pay war reparations, and also its ability to assert territorial claims against Poland and Russia in the future.

The 1945 Potsdam Agreement had specified that a full and final peace treaty concluding World War II, including the exact delimitation of Germany's postwar boundaries, would have to be "accepted by the Government of Germany when a government adequate for the purpose is established". The Federal Republic always maintained that no such government could be said to have been established until East and West Germany (and Berlin) were unified under a single democratic government (implicitly, the West German one); but some held that the combination of these three jurisdictions did not count as a unified Germany for the purpose of the peace treaty so long as its eastern boundary was the Oder–Neisse line, insofar as there was a substantial amount of pre-1938 German territory outside this reunified Germany.

The Basic Law for the Federal Republic of Germany (Grundgesetz) raised further questions. The Basic Law was intended as a provisional constitution to stand in the interim until a permanent, all-German constitution could be written. The name Grundgesetz was chosen in preference to the German for "Constitution", Verfassung, to avoid the sense of weight and permanence of the latter term. The Grundgesetz provided for two routes to an all-German state, either under Article 23 whereby "other parts of Germany", over and above the 11 then-extant States of the Federal Republic (Bundeslander) could be admitted to the federation without altering the constitutional setup. Alternatively, Article 146 provided for a constituent assembly elected across all of Germany (whatever this was held to mean) to draw up a new and theoretically permanent constitution (a true Verfassung) to replace the Grundgesetz. When German reunification was actually accomplished in 1990, the first route was chosen; the Grundgesetz remains in effect without major changes 35 years after reunification.

No functioning national government existed in Germany following the surrender of the German High Command in May 1945; all functions of government were carried out by, or under the supervision of, the Allied Powers. The Allies proposed that with the death of Adolf Hitler on 30 April 1945, given the nonfunctional state of the German government, the Reich had ceased to exist; thus, as the highest authority in Germany, the Allied Control Council became not just military occupiers but in fact the sovereign government of Germany, entitled to exercise all the powers of a sovereign state, including ceding territory to other states. Further, they argued that the Fourth Geneva Convention's restrictions on occupiers enacting fundamental changes in government or economic system did not apply; there was no government (and barely any economy) to change; moreover, denazification was considered an absolute and overriding moral imperative. Consequently, the Potsdam Agreement envisaged that, in due time, a German state would emerge from the wreckage of World War II, reuniting Berlin and the four Allied control zones; but that this state would derive its sovereignty not from the Reich, but from a transfer of authority by the Allied Control Council.

The principle of debellatio provided the legal framework for the Allies assuming sovereignty over Germany despite the absence of any instrument of surrender from the German government proper (as distinct from the armed forces). By the time the Allies obtained military surrender from Germany, no functional German government remained; thus, there was no instrument of surrender because there was nobody capable of issuing one. Inasmuch as the High Command was the last functional part of the German government, it served, pars pro toto, as the surrender of all of Germany. This was quite contrary to the surrender of Japan, throughout which the Emperor and his (theoretically) legally ordinary cabinet remained in office, with the Allied occupation authorities sitting atop it, issuing orders to and through the Japanese ministries, which remained open and functional throughout, or that of Italy, where the King of Italy threw out his Fascist ministers and appointed a government mandated to sue for peace. Likewise in Romania and Bulgaria, Axis-aligned governments were overthrown by coup and received constitutional approbation from their monarchs (or regents); this rendered the new Japanese, Italian, Romanian, and Bulgarian governments legitimate enough to retain at least some sovereignty under Allied supervision; in Germany, where Hitler was head of state, the principle that an Axis state whose monarch threw out its belligerent ministry and appointed a peace-minded could exit the war in a relatively ordinary manner one did not operate; moreover, by the end of the war, the Nazi regime was considered so overridingly evil that denazification was a non-negotiable prerequisite of any peace.

In 1948, Max Rheinstein wrote that Germany could still be considered a state in some respects under international law: "Of the criteria of a state, Germany has a territory, a population, and a government, although the latter is not of her own making. She is thus to be characterized as a "dependent state," a state which is, especially, not allowed to maintain foreign relations and which is in this respect similar to a protectorate."

From the 1950s onward, a school of German legal theorists developed the alternative view that the Allies had only become trustees of German sovereignty while the Reich government had been rendered nonfunctional; consequently, once a properly constituted German government (the Federal Republic) was re-established, it could resume the identity and legal status of the former German Reich without requiring any formal transfer of sovereignty from the Allied Control Council (which by then existed on paper only).

== Concept of the German state ==
During the time of the Holy Roman Empire (962-1806) and the German Confederation (1815-1848, 1850-1866), the German-speaking lands of Europe was divided into many small states, with this fragmentation being known as Kleinstaaterei. At the 1871 unification of Germany, the new German Reich was established constitutionally as a federative monarchy, with each state having a defined territory; and consequently the Reich was, in legal terms, considered to be the particular collection of territories which had signed on to the Constitution of the German Empire.

This geographical conception of the German state became steadily superseded in the period up to the first World War by the concept of German nationalism; that is, the idea that German-speaking people in Central Europe were a political body corporate possessed of rights as a nation state. Nonetheless, substantial German-speaking regions remained outside the Reich (principally Austria and German Switzerland); moreover, the Reich held substantial territories where Polish (Posen), French (Alsace–Lorraine), or Danish (North Schleswig) were spoken. This idea (made somewhat more coherent by the cession of the Reich's non-German-speaking territories) gained legal grounding in the constitution of the Weimar Republic, where Article 1 identifies the Reich as deriving its authority from the German people; while Article 2 identifies the state territory under the Reich as the lands which, at the time of the constitution's adoption, were within the authority of the German state.

The congruence of nation and state was bidirectional: The institutions of the German state derived their legitimacy from the German people, likewise, the German people's rights and duties derived from the establishment of the Reich as the body corporate of the German nation. Subsequently, the term German Reich continued to be applied both as identifying both the state and the citizens; increasingly, however, the sense of "the German nation politically organized" became primary. Following the Second World War, the term 'German Reich' fell out of use in constitutional formulations, being replaced by the term nation as a whole, as applied to denote the state as a totality of the German national people; and the term Germany as a whole, as applied to denote the state as a totality of German national territory.

Nevertheless, it remains fundamental to German constitutional understanding that the legal status of Germany is a function of the unified German people, and is not constrained by the boundaries of territories falling under the jurisdiction of the German state at any one time.

== Surrender of the Wehrmacht ==
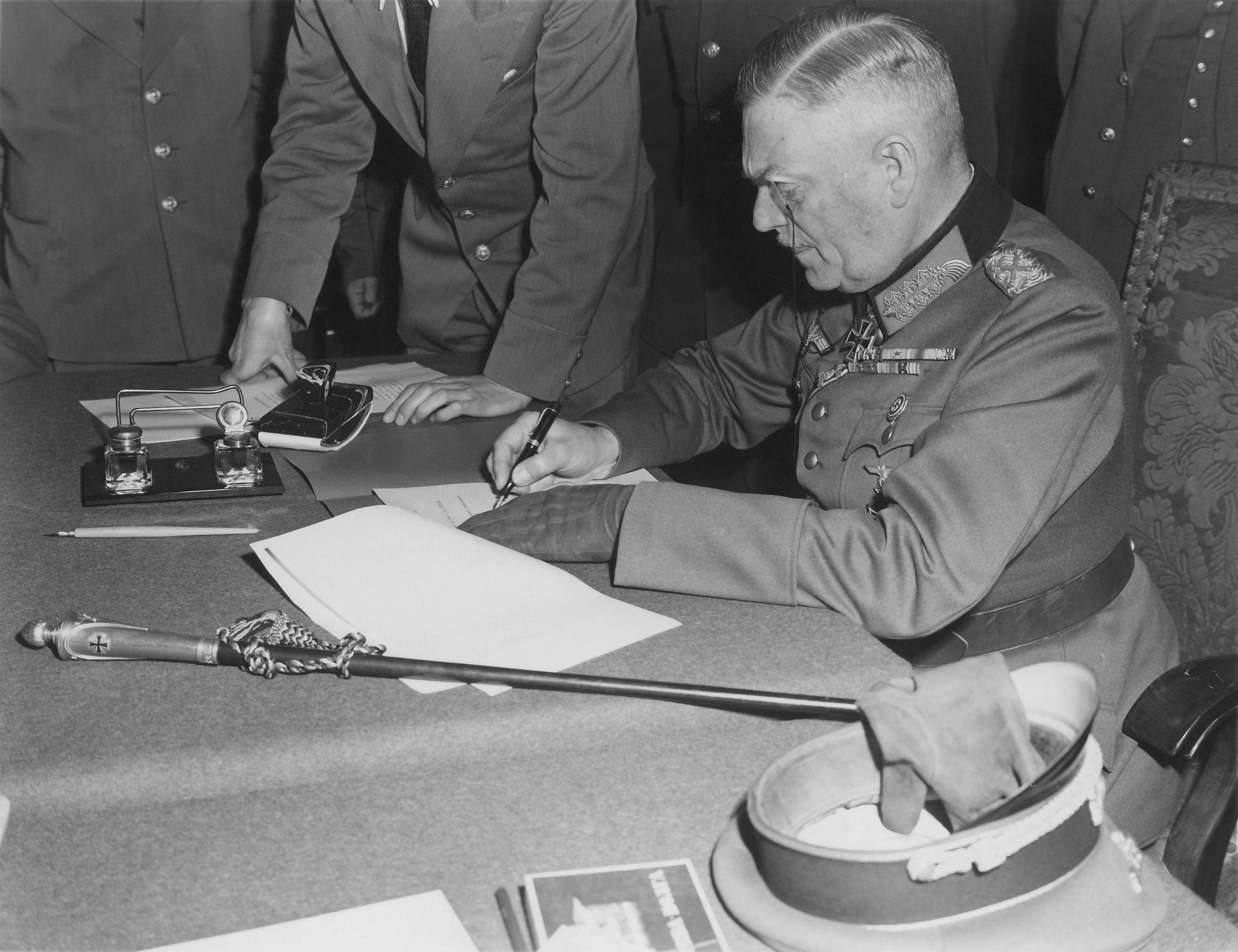
Generalfeldmarschall Wilhelm Keitel signing the Instrument of Surrender in Berlin

After the Machtergreifung of the Nazi Party in 1933, state power had been agglomerated to the hands of Reich Chancellor (Reichskanzler) Adolf Hitler, who, from the death of Reich President Paul von Hindenburg on 2 August 1934 simultaneously served as head of state (styled Führer and Reichskanzler). Furthermore, throughout the life of the Nazi regime, the functions of the Nazi Party and the state became increasingly integrated; by the final months of the war the distinction was on paper only. Following Hitler's suicide on April 30, 1945, the Goebbels cabinet laid out in his will took office; however, Goebbels took his own life the next day. Grand Admiral Karl Dönitz, appointed Reich President in Hitler's testament, gave the task of forming a government to Lutz Graf Schwerin von Krosigk; however, the consequent Flensburg Government held little de facto authority within Germany; moreover, it was it unrecognized by any Axis, Allied or neutral government.

These incidents preceded the unconditional surrender of the German armed forces (Wehrmacht), signed by nominated representatives of the three German armed services and of the military High Command (Oberkommando der Wehrmacht) in Berlin-Karlshorst. However, as a purely military instrument, no consequences incurred, as such, for the government itself. Nevertheless, by the time the Allies obtained military surrender from Germany, no functional German government (aside from that in Flensburg, which was unrecognized) remained; thus, there was no surrender from the government because there was no government left to issue one. The Allies therefore invoked the principle of debellatio, the end of a war by the complete destruction of an enemy government; inasmuch as the High Command was the last functional part of the German government, its capitulation served, pars pro toto, as the surrender of all of Germany. The Berlin Declaration announced that "[t]he unconditional surrender of Germany has thereby been effected...". Subsequent historians have treated 8 May 1945 as the date on which Nazi Germany ceased to exist.

Since 30 April, the US State Department had been actively pressuring all neutral countries that had retained diplomatic relations with Germany to prepare to close down German embassies and hand over their archives and records to the embassies of the Western Allies; some had done so even before May 8. Insofar as the High Command was the last (recognized) functional part of the German government, its capitulation was considered to extinguish the German state by debellatio, and consequently vest sovereignty over Germany in the Allied powers, all embassies remaining in neutral countries were immediately ordered by the Western Allies to be closed down, their diplomatic staff recalled and their records taken to one or another Allied embassy. Those neutral countries that had been nominated as protecting powers in respect of Germany and its allies under the Geneva Conventions were notified that this function had now been terminated, and were requested by the State Department to hand all embassy records and German state property in their trust over to the Western Allies. All the protecting powers complied fully with the Allied demands, formally breaking off diplomatic relations; consequently the German state ceased as a diplomatic entity on 8 May 1945, the day all remaining German armed forces surrendered.

On May 23, the Allies closed down the Flensburg Government, such as it was, and arrested its members. This formalised a legal vacuum that was only filled on June 5, when the commanders-in-chief of the four Allied Powers announced, in the Berlin Declaration, the assumption of "supreme authority" in Germany, ruling not just as military occupiers but as the sovereign power over Germany, possessed, in theory, with plenary power over the country. It was explicitly stated that this would not effect the annexation of Germany, although the four Powers asserted their authority, as the sole repository of German state power, to determine the future boundaries of German territory:

"There is no central Government or authority in Germany capable of accepting responsibility for the maintenance of order, the administration of the country and compliance with the requirements of the victorious Powers. The unconditional surrender of Germany has thereby been effected, and Germany has become subject to such requirements as may now or hereafter be imposed upon her."

[...]

"The Governments of the United States of America, the Union of Soviet Socialist Republics and the United Kingdom, and the Provisional Government of the French Republic, hereby assume supreme authority with respect to Germany, including all the powers possessed by the German Government, the High Command and any state, municipal, or local government or authority. The assumption, for the purposes stated above, of the said authority and powers does not effect the annexation of Germany.

The Governments of the United States of America, the Union of Soviet Socialist Republics and the United Kingdom, and the Provisional Government of the French Republic, will hereafter determine the boundaries of Germany or any part thereof and the status of Germany or of any area at present being part of German territory."

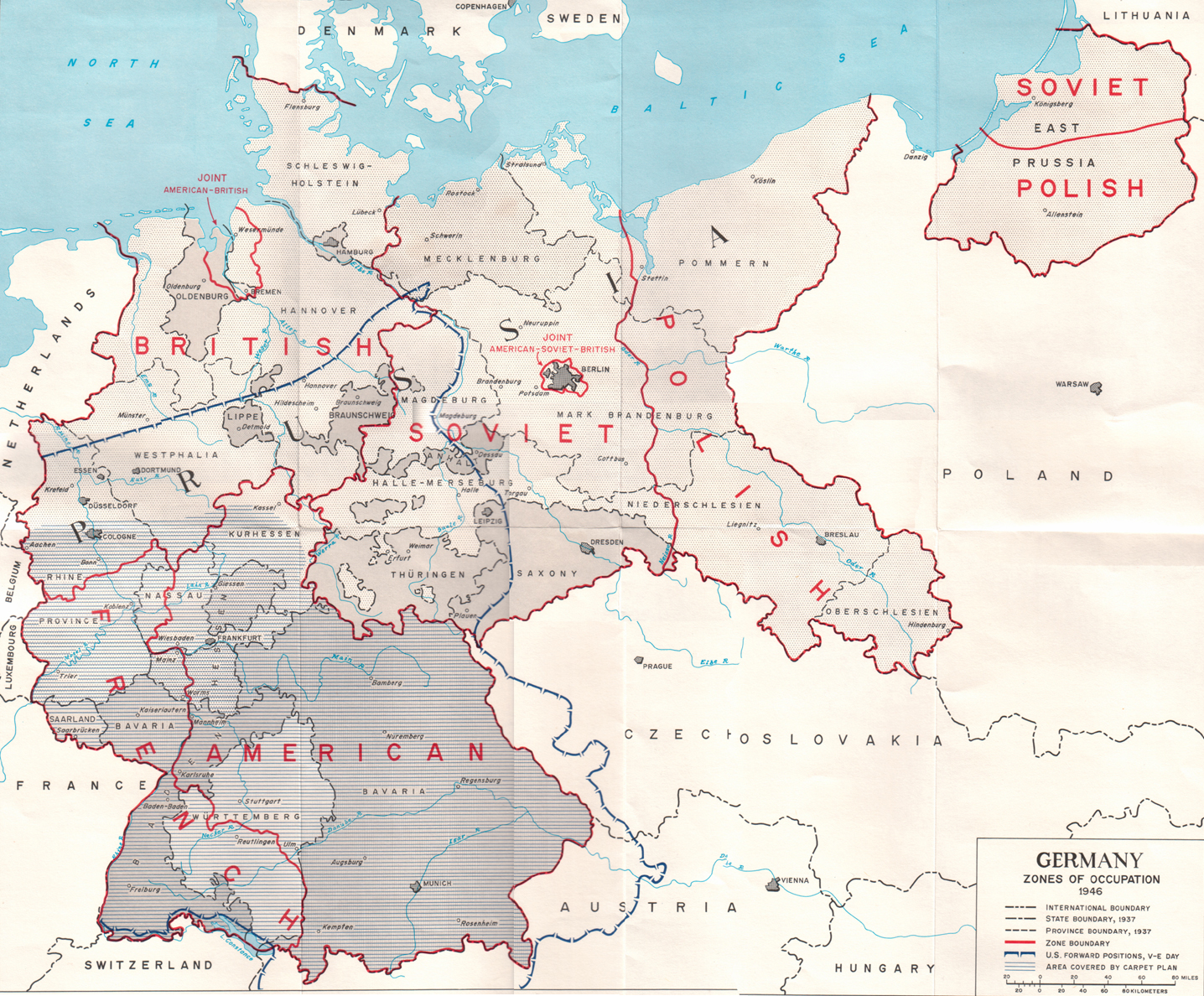
Occupied Germany within 1937 borders

State authority was from then on carried out by the Allied Control Council until its de facto suspension in 1948. All pre-war international treaties to which the Reich had been a party were renounced for Germany, save those for which continuation agreements were negotiated. International legitimation resulted from Allied occupational supremacy, and neutral countries were invited to recognise the Allied Control Council as the sole sovereign authority in Germany. Nevertheless, German nationality continued to be recognised, and Germany as a national entity continued to exist. By virtue of the legitimacy asserted in the Berlin Declaration, the Allied Powers at the Potsdam Conference assigned the eastern territories of the former German Reich to Polish and Soviet administration pending a final peace settlement. The remaining German territory was divided into four occupational zones, alongside the joint control of Berlin, which together constituted post-war 'Germany as a whole'. These were subject to the administration of an Allied Command (Alliierte Kommandantur), which in turn was subordinate to the Allied Control Council. The Polish-German border, pending exact delimitation at an eventual peace conference, was set at the Oder-Neisse line; all territories east of this became integral parts of Poland, and hence were excluded from 'Germany as a whole'.

"For occupational purposes, Germany will be divided into three zones, within her borders of December 31st 1937, to each of which one of the three powers will be assigned, as well as a special zone for Berlin, which is governed by the joint occupation of the three powers" (London Protocol of December 12th, 1944; extension to France did not take place until the Yalta Conference in February 1945.)

Meanwhile, the reconstruction of German civil public administration commenced. Municipal administrations (Gemeinden) had continued operating in most areas, and by 1946 local elections took place in all occupational zones. Moreover, Germany had long been a federal nation, and from the first days of the occupation, provisional governments were appointed for the federated states; Fritz Schäffer was appointed Minister-President of Bavaria by the Americans on 28 May, less than three weeks after capitulation. Beginning in 1946, elections to constituent assemblies were held for the newly-redrawn federal states, which allowed for state constitutions to be ratified and parliamentary democracy to begin anew in Germany, paving the way for the constitution of a democratic federal government.

== State of war ==
Cessation of hostilities between the United States and Germany had been proclaimed on 13 December 1946 by United States President Harry S. Truman. However the end of the state of war with Germany was not confirmed by the U.S. Congress until 19 October 1951, after a request by President Truman on 9 July. Thus German civilians were legally still considered enemy nationals for a long period. This state of affairs had some peculiar results: for instance marriages between white U.S. soldiers and German women were not permitted until December 1946. (The U.S. Army at the time still prohibited interracial marriages, so black soldiers had to wait until 1948.) In January 1946 the Swedish Red Cross was permitted to send food to Germany, but earlier attempts by relief agencies had been blocked by the US Treasury Department under the Trading with the Enemy Act 1917, and U.S. troops had been under orders not to share their food rations with German civilians.

In the Petersberg Agreement of November 22, 1949, it was noted that the West German government wanted an end to the state of war, but the request could not be granted. The U.S. state of war with Germany was maintained as "the U.S. [wanted] to retain a legal basis for keeping a U.S. force in Western Germany", though it was softened somewhat. At a meeting of the foreign ministers of France, the United Kingdom, and the United States in New York from September 12 to December 19, 1950, it was stated, among other measures, to strengthen West Germany's position in the Cold War, that the western allies would "end by legislation the state of war with Germany". During 1951, many former Western Allies did end their state of war with Germany: Australia (9 July), Canada, Italy, New Zealand, The Netherlands (26 July), South Africa, and the United Kingdom (9 July) The state of war between Germany and the Soviet Union was ended in early 1955. Sovereignty of the Federal Republic of Germany was granted on May 5, 1955, by the formal end of the military occupation of its territory. Special rights were however maintained, for example in relation to West Berlin, which was not permitted to formally become part of the Federal Republic. A military presence was also maintained until the full implementation, in 1994, of the Treaty on the Final Settlement with Respect to Germany (also known as the Two Plus Four Treaty), signed in 1990.

Under the terms of that treaty, the Four Powers renounced all rights they formerly held in Germany, including Berlin. As a result, Germany became fully sovereign on March 15, 1991.

=== UN Enemy State Clause ===
After Germany joined the United Nations, there had been disagreement as to whether articles 53 and 107 of the UN Charter, which defined Germany as an "enemy state", still applied, but these articles became irrelevant when the Four Powers renounced their special rights in the 1990 treaty, and they were formally recognized as obsolete by a UN General Assembly resolution in 1995.

== West and East Germany ==
Under the Potsdam Agreement the three Allied Powers, the United States, the United Kingdom and the Soviet Union, had agreed that a final peace agreement would have to wait on the re-establishment of a German government adequate for the purpose of agreeing to Allied peace terms. In the interim, it was intended that the Allied Control Council would act exercise all sovereign authority within Germany; while the Council of Foreign Ministers would oversee the development of new German State institutions. France was invited to membership of both bodies (although De Gaulle had not been invited to Potsdam, and refused to be bound by any agreements made there); but France from the first pursued a policy of obstructing any joint Allied actions that might lead to the re-emergence of Germany as a single unified state. Consequently, any establishment of formal institutions or agencies that might eventually restore unified German sovereignty was initially stalled by French objections.

Subsequently, as Cold War antagonisms grew, the same institutions came to be largely nullified by disputes between the Western Allies and the Soviet Union. The United States and the United Kingdom therefore came round to the French view that a unified German state partially subject to Soviet authority could not be allowed to emerge while the Soviet Bloc remained in eastern Europe, and so the three Western Allies resolved upon the foundation of a West German federation consisting of the territories in their three zones of occupation. This was established on 23 May 1949 with the promulgation of the Basic Law as it had been adopted by the Parliamentary Council and approved by the Western occupation forces. The Federal Republic created by the Basic Law was empowered to act upon the federal election held on 14 August, the constitutive meeting of the Bundestag parliament on 7 September, the investiture of the first Federal President, Theodor Heuss on 13 September, the appointment of Konrad Adenauer as the first Federal Chancellor on 15 September and the accession of the Federal Cabinet on 20 September 1949. In turn the Soviet Military Administration on 7 October implemented the People's Chamber (Volkskammer) parliament in the Soviet occupation zone and East Berlin, which passed the Constitution of East Germany, officially named "German Democratic Republic" (GDR). The Council of Ministers of the GDR assumed office on 12 October 1949.

On 10 April 1949, the Western Allies had drawn up the occupation statute and had it conveyed to the Parliamentary Council. Officially announced on 12 May, it reserved a number of sovereign rights, such as foreign policy and external trade, to the three western Allied authorities. Any amendment to the West German Constitution was subject to (western) Allied permission, specific laws could be rejected, and the military governors could take over all governmental power in times of crisis. Those reservations were to be executed by the Allied High Commission of the three western allies, established on 20 June and claiming to exercise supreme state power within the former western zones of occupation. On 22 November 1949, Chancellor Konrad Adenauer signed the Petersberg Agreement, under which it was recognized that the sovereignty of West Germany remained limited. The Agreement, however, extended the rights of the German Government vis-à-vis the powers provided for in the original version of the Occupation Statute.

By the General Treaty of 1955, the western allies recognized the full sovereignty of West Germany. However, in so far as the Allied High Commission was acting outside the authority of the dormant Allied Control Council, it was highly uncertain what, if any, sovereign authority it could claim over western Germany; or whether it could validly convey any sovereign authority to the new West German government. From the 1950s, the claim that there was a single continuing German Reich whose legal status was wholly untouched by the institutions established by the Allied Powers, and that the Federal Republic was the sole legal successor of that Reich, was adopted both by the Federal Government itself and by the Federal Constitutional Court. On this basis, the Federal Republic claimed an exclusive mandate for the entire postwar territory of Germany.

Initially, the 1949 constitution of the German Democratic Republic adopted a mirror image version of this claim – in being framed in anticipation of a future all-German constitution on its own political terms – and this was affirmed by the GDR's second constitution adopted in 1968. However, in 1974, all references to a wider national German nation were removed in a constitutional amendment, and from that date the GDR maintained that from 1949 there had existed two entirely separate sovereign German states. The Federal Republic's Cold-war Allies supported its claims in part, as they acknowledged the Federal Republic as the sole legitimate democratically organised state within former German territory (the GDR being construed as an illegally-constituted Soviet puppet state); but they did not accept the associated arguments for the pre-1945 Reich's continuing 'metaphysical' existence de jure within the organs of the Federal Republic.

Subsequently, under the Ostpolitik, the Federal Republic in the early 1970s sought to end hostile relations with the countries of the Eastern Bloc, in the course of which it negotiated in 1972 a Basic Treaty with the GDR, recognising it as one of two German states within one German nation, and relinquishing any claim to de jure sovereign jurisdiction over those parts of Germany within the GDR. The treaty was challenged in the Federal Constitutional Court – as apparently contradicting the overriding aspirations of the Basic Law for a unified German state – but the treaty's legality was upheld by the court. However, that ruling was heavily qualified by a reassertion of the claim that the German Reich continued to exist as an 'overall state' such that the duty to strive for future German unity could not be abandoned, albeit that without any institutional organs of itself the Reich was currently not capable of action. The Federal Republic was indeed identical with the German Reich; but this was a 'partial identity' that stopped at the boundaries of the Federal Republic and did not extend retrospectively to the period 1945–1949 before the Federal Republic had come into being. The Western Allies took this as their cue to repudiate any support for the former claims of the Federal Republic to an exclusive mandate for Germany, and at that point all recognised the GDR as a separate, sovereign state and supported the admission of both German states as members of the United Nations with equal status.

In 1975 both German states participated in the Helsinki Final Act under which the existing post-war boundaries of Europe, including the separation of East and West Germany and the border between East Germany and Poland, were confirmed as legitimate in international law.

== Continuity of German state institutions and the 'Civil Servant' case ==
Although the Federal Constitutional Court maintained that the pre-war German Reich was continuing within the organs and institutions of the Federal Republic post-1949, it differed strongly from both German academic constitutional lawyers and other Federal courts in its interpretation of that principle. This conflict came to a head over the claim from members of the Nazi-era judiciary, civil service, and academic professorships, for a right to reinstatement into their former jobs in the new Federal Republic. Under Article 131 of the Basic Law, the re-employment of these beamter, who had certain legal protections and could not be easily dismissed, or otherwise their entitlement to severance payments or pensions, had been specified to be subject to federal law. When a law was enacted in 1951, providing limited redress in employment and partial back-payment of pension entitlements, it was challenged by many former public servants and their cases were strongly supported by the Federal Court of Justice (FCJ).

The substance of the FCJ support for these cases rested on the proposition that the employment rights of public officials had been protected from political interference as a fundamental principle of the German state, albeit that this principle had been grossly violated in the Nazi period; and hence since the German state, now freed from Nazism, had continued to exist after 1945, so too had the employment of its public officials – notwithstanding the actions of the Occupying Powers in temporarily removing them. Furthermore, the FCJ noted that in the formal surrender of the German military in 1945 there had been no counterpart surrender of the German civil state; and so that state and its institutions might legally be considered to have been awaiting reactivation under the Federal Republic. For public officials to be denied reinstatement, without judicial process establishing individual complicity in the illegal actions of the Nazi regime, amounted to collective punishment; and hence was unconstitutional.

In a judgement of 1953, the Federal Constitutional Court (FCC) absolutely rejected all these arguments, reasoning that all civil services commissions had been extinguished on 8 May 1945. As the FCC reasoned, the capitulation in 1945, as well as the seizure of power by the National Socialist Party, was not merely a change in the legal form of the state (which would have left the legal status of civil servants untouched), but rather, that the institutional organisation of the German civil state had already ceased to exist, following the power grab of the National Socialist Party. Consequently, in 1945 and for many years previously, there had been no true Reich civil service in which to be employed. The same reasoning applied to the judiciary and university professors.

The entire body of German civil state organs and institutions without exception had, under the Nazi regime, been turned into "a power apparatus in the service of the Nazi Party"; a process initiated in 1933 with the "law to safeguard the unity of party and state" the continuation of which had the effect of state institutions being progressively incorporated into or replaced by the Nazi Party. Therefore, when the Nazi Party was extinguished, so too was the Nazi civil state and all jobs within it. No aspect of the Rechtsstaat, or civil state under the rule of law, would have been capable of continuity of function under the conditions of Nazi power; and none had done so. Consequently, any relief offered to former civil servants by federal law post-1949 was a matter of parliamentary grace, not of fundamental right. In particular the FCC noted that all public servants, judicial officers, and university professors had been required to swear the Hitler oath in replacement of the former oath to uphold the constitution, as a strict condition of remaining employed. Those that swore the oath (even under duress) were tacitly complicit in the dismissal of those who refused the oath.

Although the legal personality of the German Reich was considered to have survived into that of the Federal Republic, all of the organs and institutions of the Reich had long since been extinguished by the actions of the Nazi Regime, and their post-1949 successor state institutions were in no sense their continuators. The entire German federal state apparatus had been newborn, "rebuilt from the ground up" since 1949.

It followed that the Nazi civil state should be considered to have been a 'criminal state' (Verbrecherstaat), a criminal enterprise masquerading as a state. Its judges were not judges, its professors were not professors, and its civil servants were not civil servants. In this, the Federal Constitutional Court maintained an absolute difference in the respective legal status of civil and military authority under the Nazi regime; the military organisation of the German people as a nation under arms, was entirely distinct from the civil organisation of the German people as a state under the rule of law. Notwithstanding that all members of the armed services had also been required to swear their own version of the Hitler oath, their military status as German soldiers, sailors, and airmen had remained valid right up to 8 May 1945.

== German reunification ==
The German Democratic Republic's ruling communist regime collapsed in 1989, making reunification of Germany inevitable, but this raised the question of how far the former actions and laws of the pre-1989 GDR should be accepted as actions of a legitimate German sovereign state.

Some scholars argued for a revival of the theory that the sovereignty of the pre-1945 Reich had continued in existence; with the post-1949 Federal Republic as its sole interim representative (albeit only within the FRG boundaries). In turn, this was taken to imply the need for a new all-German constitution voted into effect by a unified nation under the terms of Article 146 of the Basic Law as the successor to the Federal Republic, implying the actions of the former GDR might be nullified. In the event the unification of 1990 was initiated under the quicker process of Article 23, by which existing German states could declare their accession to the Basic Law of the Federal Republic, through the decision of free representative democratic institutions. This process implicitly confirmed both the continuing sovereign status of the Federal Republic under the Basic Law, and also the de facto and de jure legal capabilities of the political institutions of the former East Germany, both in declaring accession to the Basic Law and in having previously exercised government over its population and represented them in international law; subject to extensive qualification post-1990 in categorizing the former GDR as an 'unjust state' whose population could claim redress (and be subject to penalties) in respect of actions before 1990 that had been inconsistent with the principles of Human Rights, as these had been incorporated into East German public law.

An Article 146 unification would have entailed protracted negotiations that would have opened up festering issues in West Germany. Even without that to consider, East Germany was in a state of near-total economic and political collapse. By comparison, an Article 23 reunification could be completed in as little as six months.

Hence, when the two Germanies agreed to an emergency merger of their economies in May 1990, they also agreed to pursue reunification via the quicker Article 23 route. On 23 August 1990, the Volkskammer of the GDR declared the accession of East Germany to the Federal Republic under Article 23 of the Basic Law; and so initiated the process of reunification, to come into effect on 3 October 1990. Nevertheless, the act of reunification itself (with its many specific terms and conditions, including the fundamental amendments to the Basic Law) was achieved constitutionally by the subsequent Unification Treaty of 31 August 1990; that is through a binding agreement between the former GDR and the Federal Republic now recognising each other as separate sovereign states in international law. The treaty was voted into effect on 20 September 1990 by the Volkskammer and the Bundestag, by the constitutionally required two-thirds majorities, effecting the extinction of the GDR on the one hand, and the agreed amendments to the Basic Law of the Federal Republic, on the other.

Under these terms, the German Democratic Republic joined the Federal Republic and ceased to exist as of midnight Central European Time on 3 October. At the same time five reconstituted states on its territory were created. East and West Berlin united as a single city-state, which became the capital of the enlarged Federal Republic. The process did not create a third state out of the two. Rather, West Germany effectively absorbed East Germany, and the area in which the Basic Law was in force was extended to cover the former territory of the GDR. Thus, the enlarged Federal Republic continued under the same legal identity of the old West Germany.

Although the GDR had nominally declared its accession the Federal Republic under Article 23 of the Basic Law, this did not imply its acceptance of the Basic Law as it then stood, but rather of the Basic Law as subsequently amended in line with the Unification Treaty and the Treaty of Final Settlement ("Two Plus Four Treaty"). These amendments had the effect of removing all those clauses by which the Federal Constitutional Court had formerly maintained the identity of the Federal Republic with the historic German Reich as an 'overall state', specifically including the very Article 23 that had provided the basis for the Volkskammer's ongoing declaration of accession.

Under the "Two Plus Four Treaty" both the Federal Republic and the GDR committed themselves and their unified continuation to the principle that their joint pre-1990 boundaries constituted the entire territory that could be claimed by any government of Germany, and hence that there were no further lands outside those boundaries that were parts of "Germany as a whole". The 1990 Basic Law amendments required for German reunification also explicitly excluded providing redress or restitution for actions undertaken under the authority of the Soviet Occupation 1945–1949 prior to the founding of the Federal Republic and the GDR.

This raised a further complex of constitutional issues, as a number of private individuals challenged the constitutionality of the reunification treaties, specifically in respect of the levels of compensation and restitution offered to persons whose property had been expropriated between 1945 and 1949 under Soviet authority. The plaintiffs argued that, as the Federal Republic had historically claimed its sovereignty to be a continuation of that of the former governments of the German Reich, so post-1990, so should it provide restitution in favor of expropriated property owners (or their heirs) for actions in the period when German sovereign power had been dormant. The cases were eventually heard before the Grand Chamber of the European Court of Human Rights in 2005, which found consistently in favor of the post-1990 actions of the Federal Republic – hence rejecting arguments that claimed that the sovereignty of the Federal Republic maintained that of an unbroken but dormant post-war German Reich – declaring that the four Allied Powers had, in the years 1945–1949, exercised "an occupation sui generis following a war and unconditional capitulation, which conferred powers of 'sovereignty' on the occupying forces".

In the process of reunion, Article 23 of the Basic Law had been repealed, closing off the possibility that any further former parts of Germany might subsequently declare their accession to the Federal Republic; while Article 146 was amended to state explicitly that the territory of the newly unified republic then comprised the entirety of Germany as a whole; "This Basic Law, which since the achievement of the unity and freedom of Germany applies to the entire German people, shall cease to apply on the day on which a constitution freely adopted by the German people takes effect." This was confirmed in the 1990 rewording of the preamble; "Germans ... have achieved the unity and freedom of Germany in free self-determination. This Basic Law thus applies to the entire German people."

From 1990 therefore, there could be no constitutional basis for maintaining any future legal identity for Germany and the German people outside of the unified territories and populations of East Germany, West Germany, and Berlin.

== See also ==
- German Question
- Debellatio
- Occupation statute (1949)
- Petersberg Agreement (1949)
- Bonn–Paris conventions (1952, came into force in 1955)
- Four Power Agreement on Berlin (1971)
- Basic Treaty (1972)
- Treaty on the Final Settlement with Respect to Germany ("Two Plus Four Agreement")
