= London Six-Power Conference =

1948 conference on post-WWII Germany

The London Six-Power Conference in 1948 was held between the three Western occupation forces in Germany after the World War II (United States, Britain and France) and the Benelux countries. The aim of the conference was to pave the way for Germany's participation in the international community through the creation of a democratic and federal government in the area of the U.S., British and French zones of the country. The conference was held in two sessions, the first from 23 February to 6 March, the second from 20 April to 2 June 1948.

The reason for summoning the conference was that the Foreign Secretary Conference 15 December 1947 between the four victorious nations United States, Britain, France and the Soviet Union had ended without result in the German question. The recent Communist takeover in Czechoslovakia made it urgent for the western allies to help create a democratic (West) Germany. The Soviet Union was not invited to the London Conference.

The conference conclusions were later called London recommendations. The three western military governors in Germany were assigned to make recommendations to the Minister Presidents in western Germany about how the new state should be established. The Minister Presidents should convene a constitutional Assembly (Parliamentary Council) to found a free and democratic state. The Military Governors recommendations were called the Frankfurt Documents after the place where the German Minister Presidents met.

Conditions were made that Germany should not have weapons of mass destruction and other similar weapons, and that the country should not be able to invade the Soviet occupation zone.

France voted for the merger of the three western occupation zones on conditions that the Saarland was financially merged with France and that the Ruhr area became subject to international control.

USSR ended its efforts in the Allied Control Council as a consequence of the London Conference.

== See also ==
- Basic Law for the Federal Republic of Germany
- Berlin Blockade
- Bonn–Paris conventions
- Germany Treaty
- London and Paris Conferences
- Occupation statute
- Petersberg Agreement
