= Telcon (disambiguation) =

Telcon may refer to:

- Telcon, Air Traffic Control telephone conference
- Telegraph Construction and Maintenance Company (Telcon), British submarine telegraph cable manufacturer, initially operating out of Enderby's Wharf.
- Telco Construction Equipment, Indian construction equipment manufacturer
