= Treaty on the Final Settlement with Respect to Germany =

1990 German reunification agreement

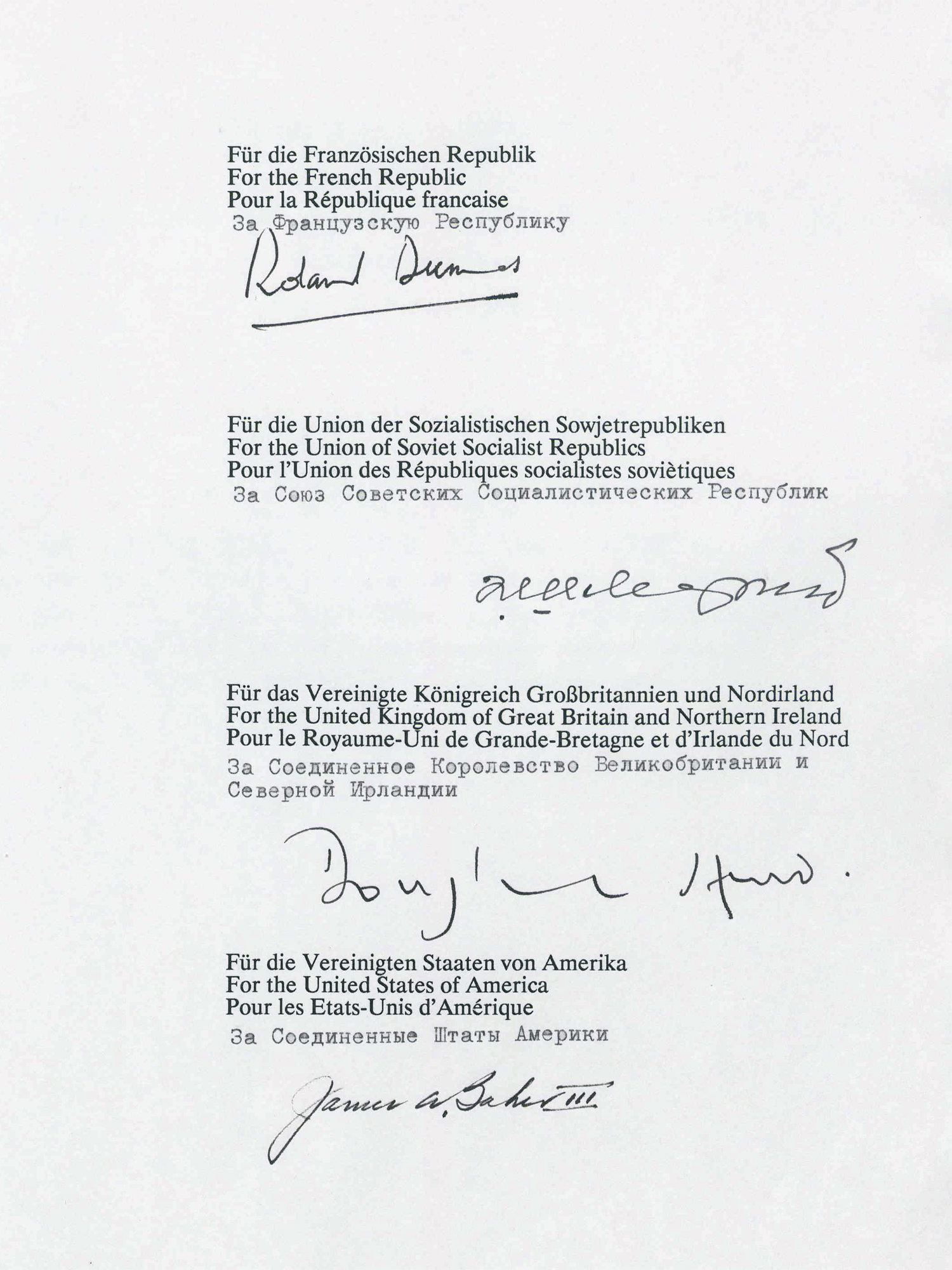
- Drafted: 13 February 1990
- Signed: 12 September 1990
- Location: Moscow, Russian SFSR, Soviet Union
- Effective: 15 March 1991
- Signatories: (West Germany) Hans-Dietrich Genscher; (East Germany) Lothar de Maizière; (France) Roland Dumas; (Soviet Union) Eduard Shevardnadze; (United Kingdom) Douglas Hurd; (United States) James Baker
- Parties: (West Germany) Federal Republic of Germany; (East Germany) German Democratic Republic; France; Soviet Union; United Kingdom; United States
- Depositary: Government of the Federal Republic of Germany
- Languages: English; French; German; Russian

Full text
- Treaty on the Final Settlement with Respect to Germany at Wikisource

The Treaty on the Final Settlement with Respect to Germany (German: Vertrag über die abschließende Regelung in Bezug auf Deutschland (Note: French: Traité sur le règlement final en ce qui concerne l'Allemagne; Russian: Договор об окончательном урегулировании в отношении Германии, romanized: Dogovor ob okonchatel'nom uregulirovanii v otnoshenii Germanii)), more commonly referred to as the Two Plus Four Agreement (Zwei-plus-Vier-Vertrag (Note: French: Accord Deux Plus Quatre; Russian: Соглашение «Два плюс четыре», romanized: Soglasheniye «Dva plyus chetyre»)), is an international agreement that allowed the reunification of Germany in October 1990. It was negotiated in 1990 between the 'two', the Federal Republic of Germany and the German Democratic Republic, in addition to the Four Powers which had occupied Germany at the end of World War II in Europe: France, the Soviet Union, the United Kingdom, and the United States. The treaty supplanted the 1945 Potsdam Agreement: in it, the Four Powers renounced all rights they had held with regard to Germany, allowing for its reunification as a fully sovereign state the following year. Additionally, the two German states agreed to reconfirm the existing border with Poland in the German–Polish Border Treaty, accepting that German territory post-reunification would consist only of what was administered by West and East Germany—renouncing explicitly any possible claims to the former eastern territories of Germany including East Prussia, most of Silesia, and the eastern parts of Brandenburg and Pomerania.

== Background ==
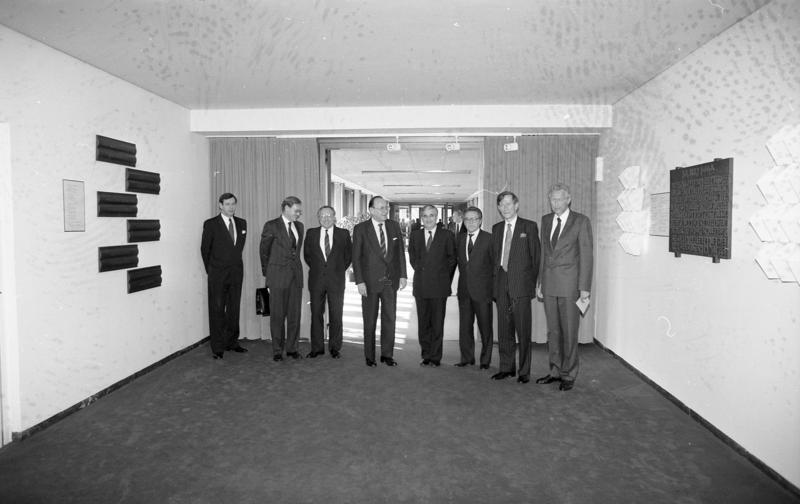
Hans-Dietrich Genscher and other participants in the first round of talks conducted in March 1990 to negotiate the treaty, 14 March 1990, Ministry of Foreign Affairs, Bonn

On 1 August 1945, the Potsdam Agreement, promulgated in the Potsdam Conference, among other things agreed on the initial terms under which the Allies of World War II would govern Germany. A provisional German–Polish border known as the Oder–Neisse line awarded, in theory within the context of that "provisional border", most of Germany's former eastern provinces to Poland and the Soviet Union. The German populations of these areas either fled or were expelled. Although the German Democratic Republic formally accepted the border in the 1950 Treaty of Zgorzelec with Poland, West Germany initially entirely rejected it, declaring the treaty "null and void" in line with the Hallstein Doctrine, and later reluctantly recognised the border in the 1970 Treaty of Warsaw as provisional only, to be finalised by "a peace settlement for Germany to be accepted by the Government of Germany when a government adequate for the purpose is established" (Potsdam Agreement 1.3.1). The overall "German Question" became one of the salient and crucial issues of the long-running Cold War, and until it ended in the late 1980s, little progress had been made in the establishment of a single government of Germany adequate for the purpose of agreeing to a final settlement. This meant that in some respects (largely, but not entirely, technical), Germany did not have full national sovereignty.

Several developments in 1989 and 1990, collectively termed Die Wende and the Peaceful Revolution, led to the fall of the Berlin Wall and the collapse of the SED party in East Germany (GDR). In a 9 February 1990 conversation with Mikhail Gorbachev held in Moscow, US Secretary of State James Baker argued in favor of holding the Two-Plus-Four talks. According to Moscow as well as Baker's notes, the famous "not one inch eastward" promise about NATO's eastward expansion was made during this conversation. The concession essentially meant that the western half of the unified Germany would be part of NATO but the eastern half would not. The US National Security Council pointed out that it would be unworkable, and the concession was later amended to state that NATO troops would not be stationed in East Germany.

On 18 March 1990, a national election was held in the GDR, leading to an alliance of parties that favored German reunification winning a plurality. (Note: A mechanism for such unification existed via the article 23 of the Basic Law for the Federal Republic of Germany.) To achieve unity and full sovereignty, both German states were willing to accept the terms of the Potsdam Agreement that affected Germany. On 31 August 1990, the FRG and GDR signed the Unification Treaty, which describes the manner and specifics of the GDR's accession to the Federal Republic. It was then possible for all international parties to negotiate a final settlement.

== Treaty ==
The Treaty on the Final Settlement with Respect to Germany was signed in Moscow on 12 September 1990, and paved the way for German reunification on 3 October 1990. Under the terms of the treaty, the Four Powers renounced all rights they formerly held in Germany, including those regarding the city of Berlin. Although the treaty was signed by West and East Germany as separate sovereign states, it was subsequently ratified by the united Federal Republic of Germany. Upon deposit of the last instrument of ratification, united Germany became fully sovereign on 15 March 1991, the day the treaty formally entered into force.

=== Alliances ===
The treaty allows Germany to make and belong to alliances, without any foreign influence in its politics. However, West German chancellor Helmut Kohl, who became chancellor of the reunified Germany, made no secret that the enlarged Federal Republic would inherit the West German seats in NATO and the European Communities.

=== Military forces and nuclear weapons ===
All Soviet forces in Germany were to leave the country by the end of 1994. Before the Soviets withdrew, Germany would only deploy territorial defense units not integrated into the alliance structures. German forces in the rest of Germany were assigned to areas where Soviet troops were stationed. After the Soviets withdrew, the Germans could freely deploy troops in those areas, with the exception of nuclear weapons. For the duration of the Soviet presence, Allied troops would remain stationed in Berlin upon Germany's request.

Germany undertook efforts to reduce its armed forces to no more than 370,000 personnel, no more than 345,000 of whom were to be in the Army and the Air Force. These limits would commence at the time that the Treaty on Conventional Armed Forces in Europe would enter into force, and the treaty also took note that it was expected that the other participants in the negotiations would "render their contribution to enhancing security and stability in Europe, including measures to limit personnel strengths". Germany also reaffirmed its renunciation of the manufacture, possession of, and control over nuclear, biological, and chemical weapons, and in particular, that the Nuclear Non-Proliferation Treaty would continue to apply in full to the unified Germany (the Federal Republic of Germany). No foreign armed forces, nuclear weapons, or the carriers for nuclear weapons would be stationed or deployed in six states (the area of Berlin and the former East Germany), making them a permanent Nuclear-Weapon-Free Zone. The German Army could deploy conventional weapons systems with nonconventional capabilities, provided that they were equipped and designed for a purely conventional role. Germany also agreed to use military force only in accordance with the United Nations Charter.

=== Future territorial claims ===
Another of the treaty's important provisions was Germany's confirmation of the by now internationally recognised border with Poland, and other territorial changes in Germany that had taken place since 1945, preventing any future claims to lost territory east of the Oder–Neisse line (see former eastern territories of Germany). The treaty defined the territory of a 'united Germany' as being the territory of East Germany, West Germany, and Berlin, prohibiting Germany from making any future territorial claims. Germany also agreed to sign a separate treaty with Poland reaffirming the present common border, binding under international law, effectively relinquishing these territories to Poland. This was done on 14 November 1990, with the signing of the German–Polish Border Treaty.

Furthermore, along with reunification, the Federal Republic changed Article 23 of its constitution, the "Basic Law". Up until then, it specifically mentioned that "other parts of Germany" may join its area of application. This was removed and, in 1992, replaced with text that directed German policies towards a stronger integration within the European Union and established ground rules for the transfer of sovereignty to a European level. Moreover, the Basic Law's preamble and Article 146 were amended to mention that the constitution now covers "the entire German population" and listing the 16 German federal states as its area of application. While this indirectly defines the external borders of Germany, the Basic Law does not specifically mention the details or finality of these borders.

== Implementation ==
=== Russian withdrawal from Germany ===
After the Soviet Union dissolved itself in December 1991, the command unit of the Soviet Group of Soviet Forces in Germany devolved to the Russian Federation. The German government subsequently recognized the Russian Federation's claim to be the successor state of the Soviet Union, including the right to maintain troops in Germany until the end of 1994. However, with post-Soviet Russia facing severe economic hardship, President Boris Yeltsin ordered Russian troop deployment in Germany to be reduced to levels significantly below those permitted in the Treaty. The last Russian troops left Germany at the end of August 1994, four months before the treaty deadline.

=== Bundeswehr after the treaty ===
In the first decade of the 21st century, the Bundeswehr underwent a gradual transformation to a fully professional force. By 1 July 2011, the date on which Germany voluntarily suspended conscription, the Bundeswehr retained fewer than 250,000 active duty personnel – barely two thirds of the country's treaty limit. By 2025, the number of active personnel of the Bundeswehr further decreased to below 183,000. After the 2022 Russian Invasion of Ukraine, the German government announced a significant and long-term increase of German military spending, although the total number of active personnel is aimed to increase only moderately, up to 260,000, which is still well below the stipulations of the Treaty on the Final Settlement with Respect to Germany.

== Later developments ==
Map showing the history of NATO enlargement in Europe

In 1990, the Soviet Union and the Western nations signed the Treaty on Conventional Armed Forces in Europe and in 1991 the Energy Charter Treaty, establishing a multilateral framework for cross-border cooperation in the energy industry, principally the fossil fuel industry; Russia postponed ratification of the latter treaty, linking it to the adoption of the Energy Charter Treaty Transit Protocol. In 1994, the Budapest Memorandum was signed where Russia, the United Kingdom, and the United States made security assurances to Belarus, Kazakhstan, and Ukraine, in return for handing over by these three countries of their post-Soviet nuclear arsenal. In 1997, NATO and Russia signed the Russia–NATO Founding Act, which stated that each country had a sovereign right to seek alliances. NATO ended up expanding to sixteen Eastern countries (apart from the GDR in 1990): Czech Republic, Hungary, and Poland in 1999; Bulgaria, Estonia, Latvia, Lithuania, Romania, Slovakia, and Slovenia in 2004; Albania and Croatia in 2009; Montenegro in 2017; North Macedonia in 2020; Finland in 2023; and Sweden in 2024, five of them on the border with Russia.

Russia–NATO relations started to deteriorate rapidly following the Ukrainian Orange Revolution in 2004–2005. In December 2006, Russia indicated that the ratification of the Energy Charter Treaty was unlikely due to the provisions requiring third-party access to Russia's pipelines. In 2007 Russia suspended its participation in the Treaty on Conventional Armed Forces in Europe. In 2008, the relations deteriorated further and became almost openly hostile, following the 2008 Kosovo declaration of independence from Russia's ally Serbia and its partial recognition by the West, to which Russia responded in August 2008 with launching the Russo-Georgian War. On 20 August 2009, Russia officially informed the depository of the Energy Charter Treaty (the Government of Portugal) that it did not intend to become a contracting party to the treaty. On 1 April 2014, NATO unanimously decided to suspend all practical co-operation with the Russian Federation in response to the annexation of Crimea, but the NATO-Russia Council (NRC) was not suspended. In 2015, Russia entirely terminated its participation in the Treaty on Conventional Armed Forces in Europe. On 18 February 2017, Russia's minister of foreign affairs, Sergey Lavrov, said he supported the resumption of military cooperation with the NATO alliance. In late March 2017, the Council met in advance of a NATO foreign ministers' conference in Brussels, Belgium.

After the subsequent 2022 Russian invasion of Ukraine, the Founding Act has been considered by the NATO member states as definitively abrogated in its entirety by Russia, while the latter has been declared at the 2022 NATO Madrid summit "a direct threat" to Euro-Atlantic security. In the same year, Russia withdrew from the European Convention on Human Rights and was expelled from the Council of Europe.

=== Russian claims of unwritten assurances ===
The treaty does not mention NATO membership prospects of any other countries, as none of them has been a party to the treaty, while only four out of the fifteen NATO member states at the time have been parties to it. Some commentators, such as Stephen F. Cohen, as well as Mikhail Gorbachev in 2008, have advanced in later years the interpretation of a comment allegedly made by US Secretary of State, James Baker, to the effect that NATO would expand "not one inch eastward" in a unified Germany, as applying instead to Eastern Europe; neither has such a provision been included in the treaty, nor any of the parties has proposed or demanded its inclusion, and neither a recording nor written minutes of Baker's comment exist. In 2014, Gorbachev said that the assurance only pertained to East Germany, and that the resulting agreement was upheld by NATO. His main aide in these negotiations, Eduard Shevardnadze, likewise agreed that NATO never made any such commitment regarding other countries in Eastern Europe, and that "the question never came up" in the talks on German reunification. That is presumably because all of the countries in question were still in the Warsaw Pact at the time and hosted large Soviet garrisons. Gorbachev and his successor, Boris Yeltsin, felt that NATO's later acceptance of countries like Poland violated the spirit of the earlier agreements.

In December 2017, researchers Tom Blanton and Svetlana Savranskaya argued that declassified documents challenged this narrative. They commented:

The documents show that multiple national leaders were considering and rejecting Central and Eastern European membership in NATO as of early 1990 and through 1991, that discussions of NATO in the context of German unification negotiations in 1990 were not at all narrowly limited to the status of East German territory, and that subsequent Soviet and Russian complaints about being misled about NATO expansion were founded in written contemporaneous memcons and telcons at the highest levels.

They further said that,

the view of the State Department was that NATO expansion was not on the agenda, because it was not in the interest of the U.S. to organize 'an anti-Soviet coalition' that extended to the Soviet borders, not least because it might reverse the positive trends in the Soviet Union. (See Document 26) The Bush administration took the latter view. And that's what the Soviets heard.

In 2018, Hannes Adomeit disputed the conclusions by Blanton and Savranskaya, saying that those documents were already known, and that,

it is inadmissible to conclude that assurances concerning the expansion of NATO command structures and the stationing of NATO forces on the territory of the former GDR had anything to do with promises concerning the enlargement of the Alliance east of a unified Germany.

Additionally, he stated that,

a distinction must be drawn between informal or exploratory talks of this nature on the one hand and negotiations, promises, commitments or indeed guarantees on the other.

An analysis by Marc Trachtenberg in 2021 concluded that "the Russian allegations are by no means baseless ... But the Soviets were not deliberately misled." In her 2021 book Not One Inch: America, Russia, and the Making of the Cold War Stalemate, Mary Elise Sarotte balanced out these different interpretations, concluding that Russian claims of betrayal are in fact untrue in law but have psychological truth.

On 18 February 2022, German magazine Der Spiegel published an investigation of the British National Archives in which Joshua Shifrinson (Boston University) discovered a memo classified as "secret" dated 6 March 1991 (approximately five months after the 2+4 negotiations). The memo is about a meeting of the directors of the US, UK, French and West German foreign ministries in Bonn. According to the memo, Jürgen Chrobog, the Western German representative, stated that "during the 2+4 negotiations we made it clear that we [Germany] would not expand NATO beyond the Elbe [sic]. We cannot therefore offer Poland and the others NATO membership." Klaus Wiegrefe says that Chrobog may have confused the Elbe for the Oder, to which NATO was supposed to extend upon German unification, that Bonn had never made it clear that NATO would not expand beyond the Elbe. (Note: This is partly due to the fact that at the time the Warsaw Pact was still in existence and neighboring Poland was formally a part of it.) According to Die Welt, a German foreign minister at the time would never make a binding statement on behalf of NATO.

Russian claims of the alleged 1990 assurances on a non-expansion of NATO to Gorbachev were again raised on the occasions of the annexation of Crimea by the Russian Federation in 2014 and the 2021–2022 Russo-Ukrainian crisis, during which the Russian president, Vladimir Putin, demanded a legal ban on Ukraine joining NATO, which both Ukraine and NATO refused, and the subsequent invasion of Ukraine by Russia. The invocation of this alleged non-expansion pledge was cited by Russia to disregard the Budapest Memorandum but has been rebuffed by NATO.

== See also ==
- Allied Control Council
- Berlin Declaration
- Basic Treaty
- Bonn–Paris conventions
- Controversy in Russia regarding the legitimacy of eastward NATO expansion
- Council of Foreign Ministers
- Four Power Agreement on Berlin
- Germany Treaty
- London and Paris Conferences
- Occupation statute
- Petersberg Agreement
