= International Authority for the Ruhr =

Regulator for West German coal and steel (1949–1952)

- 1949–1952
- Map of the Ruhr region within Germany.
- Status: International body
- Capital: Düsseldorf
- Historical era: Cold War
  - London Six-Power Conference: 28 April 1949
  - Treaty of Paris: 18 April 1951
  - Disestablished: 25 June 1952
Preceded by
Western Allies
Allied-occupied Germany
Ruhr area
Succeeded by
European Coal and Steel Community
- ^{1} The London Agreement stipulates the location of a headquarters in North Rhine-Westphalia.

The International Authority for the Ruhr (IAR) was an international body established in 1949 by the Western Allies to regulate the coal and steel industries of the Ruhr area in West Germany. Its seat was in Düsseldorf.

The Ruhr Authority was set out in the communiqué issued on 7 June 1948, after the London Six-Power Conference between the United States of America, the United Kingdom, France and the Benelux countries. It was abolished following the 1951 Treaty of Paris, and its activities were given to the European Coal and Steel Community (ECSC). An Agreement to terminate the IAR was signed at Paris on 19 October 1951, and agreement on termination of the functions of the IAR came in to force on 25 June 1952.

== Background ==
The Ruhr region of Germany has historically been key to the country’s industrial strength due to its rich supply of coal and coke which attracted iron, steel and heavy engineering plants. The Ruhr was also a major exporter of coal, essential for a large part of the French, Belgian and Luxembourg steel industries. Following both World War I and World War II, a shortage of coking coal caused the steel industries of Western Europe to operate below capacity.

The idea of controlling the Ruhr originated in the Versailles Conference and the Reparation Conferences following World War I. After World War II, the region became part of the British occupation zone. France proposed the separation of the Ruhr from the rest of Germany, and control of the Ruhr by an international regime but the British refused.

The start of the Cold War, including the failure to reach consensus on a peace treaty for Germany at the Council of Foreign Ministers meeting in Moscow in April 1947, changed the context of French policy toward Germany. Also, the U.S. European Recovery Plan (Marshall Plan) aimed at reviving the economies of Western Europe, including West Germany. As a consequence, French policy shifted to ensure that economic recovery in Germany was coupled with safeguards for France regarding Ruhr coal and steel. An initial sketch of the IAR was produced on 14 August 1947 following discussions between U.S. Under Secretary of State for Economic Affairs Will Clayton and French officials, including Georges Bidault and Jean Monnet.

== Establishment of the International Authority for the Ruhr ==
The International Authority for the Ruhr (IAR) was created as part of the agreement negotiated at the London Six-Power Conference in June 1948 to establish the Federal Republic of Germany. The New York Times said the IAR was "designed to convert this Pandora's box that has loosed so much evil on the world into an instrument for peace and prosperity."

The Ruhr Authority was one of the Allied control bodies that aimed to accomplish three main objectives: to assure the disarmament and demilitarization of Germany, to further the recovery of the European nations, and to promote "that intimate association of their economic life which in the last analysis alone can assure a peaceful and prosperous Europe." The Authority would "supervise the production, organization, trade and ownership policies of the Ruhr industries and distribute their products so that all countries cooperating for the common economic good will have adequate access to them. This means for the present the countries of the Marshall Plan, including Germany."

The Statute for the IAR was signed and came into effect on 28 April 1949.

== Council ==
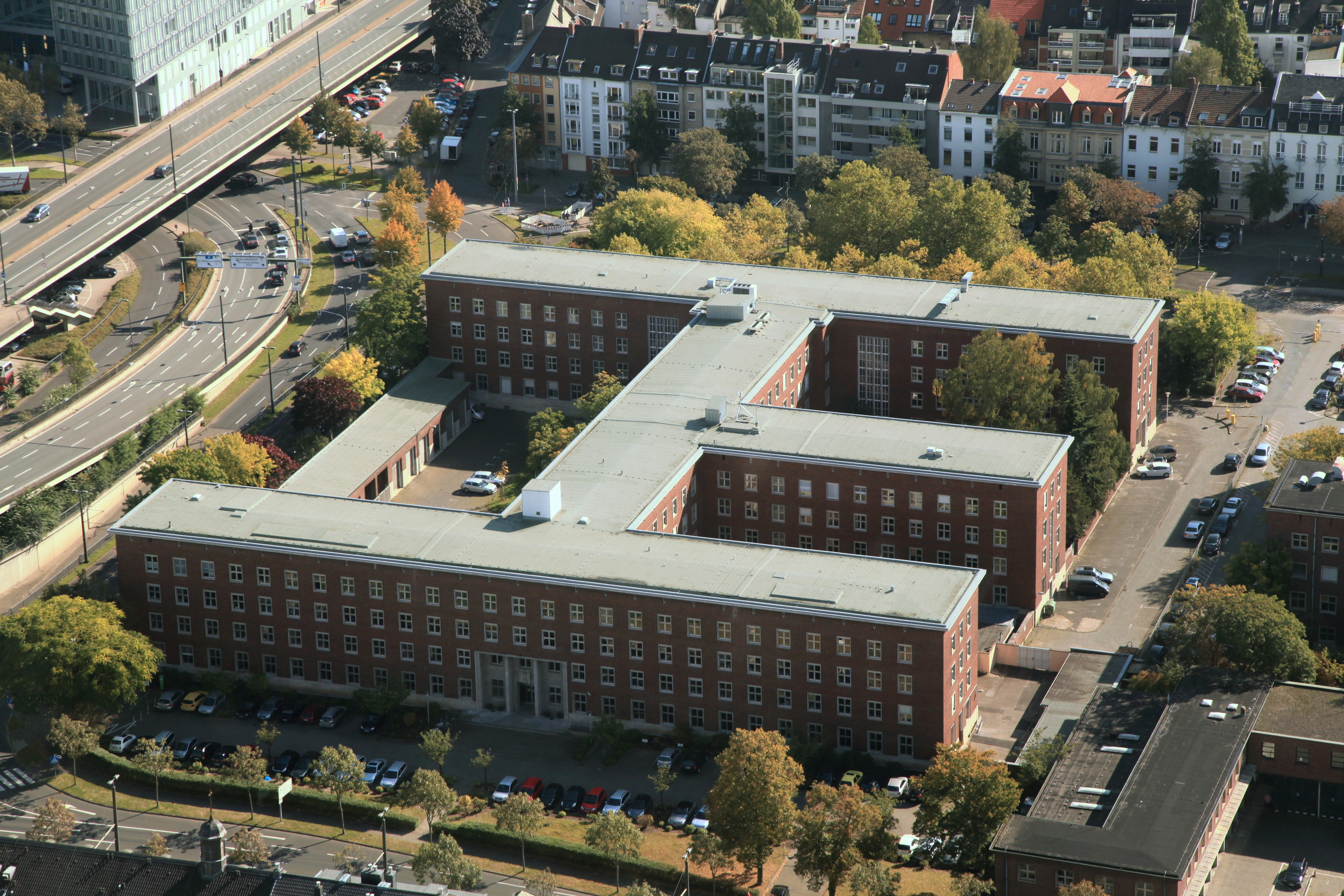
Atlantikhaus in the Government District of Düsseldorf, from 1949 to 1953 seat of the International Authority for the Ruhr, now Ministry of Building, Housing, Urban Development and Transport of the State of North Rhine-Westphalia

The mechanism outlined in the Ruhr Agreement to allocate coal and steel supplies was a council composed of representatives of the signatory governments of the London Six-Power Conference. The representatives of France, the US and the UK had three votes each, and the representatives of Belgium, the Netherlands and Luxembourg had one vote each. The agreement also stipulated the accession of Occupied Germany, with three votes for its representatives, as soon as it formed a government recognized by the Allies. Following the Petersberg Agreement, that role came to be held by West Germany.

The IAR was set up for an indefinite period. It transmitted its decisions and recommendations to the Occupation Authorities "who were to insure that its decisions would be carried out."

== Operation and termination ==
During the period of its operation, the main power exercised by the International Authority for the Ruhr (IAR) was fixing of the amount of coal to be exported from Western Germany. (The price and quantity of exports was regulated, but otherwise the coal was sold commercially, and it was not reparations.) Although the IAR had the power to fix the export of steel in the same manner, it made no decisions on this as there appeared to be no problem of access to Ruhr steel. The IAR also had the power to examine whether trade and commercial practices affecting coal and steel impeded access by other countries, but this power was little-used.

In the first part of 1950, supply difficulties in the European coal market practically disappeared, and surpluses were accumulated in the second quarter of 1950. Until the Autumn of 1950, the IAR made its first four quarterly export allocations by unanimous decisions (that is, with the agreement of the German council members).

In May 1950, the French proposed pooling the markets for coal and steel of France, Germany, and other European countries wanting to participate. French Foreign Minister Schuman's plan was "an entirely different approach" to the coal and steel problem, as it involved treating the Germans as equals, and with the right to negotiate on the provisions of the plan. Care was taken in these talks to disassociate the Schuman Plan from any of the IAR controls.

Negotiations on the Schuman Plan led to the Treaty of Paris (1951) which established the European Coal and Steel Community (ECSC). That treaty was initialled on 18 April 1951, but still needed to be ratified by the signatory governments (Belgium, France, Germany, Italy, Luxembourg, the Netherlands). Once the treaty was ratified the IAR was to be abolished.

The start of the Korean war in June 1950 led to a shortage of coal in Europe and pressure on coal supplies. In the first three quarters of 1951, the German members of the IAR council were outvoted by the other members on the coal export amounts. By the Autumn of 1951 there was concern that open disputes might have a serious effect in the parliaments where debate on the ratification of the Schuman Plan was imminent. In the fall of 1951, therefore, it was decided to move the coal allocation function away from the "tensions and frictions" of the IAR to Bonn, where the economic advisors of the Allied High Commission "could negotiate in an atmosphere more conducive to compromise." A formula was determined for coal exports that was based on production levels, and permission was given to increase the German coal export price. Introduction of the new formula brought to an end any work of the International Ruhr Authority in regard to coal in Western Europe.

By the middle of 1952 the Schuman plan proposal was ratified and the European Coal and Steel Community agreement entered into force on 23 July 1952. Agreement to terminate the IAR came into force on 25 June 1952, and the Authority held its last meeting and was dissolved on 11 February 1953.

== Geography ==
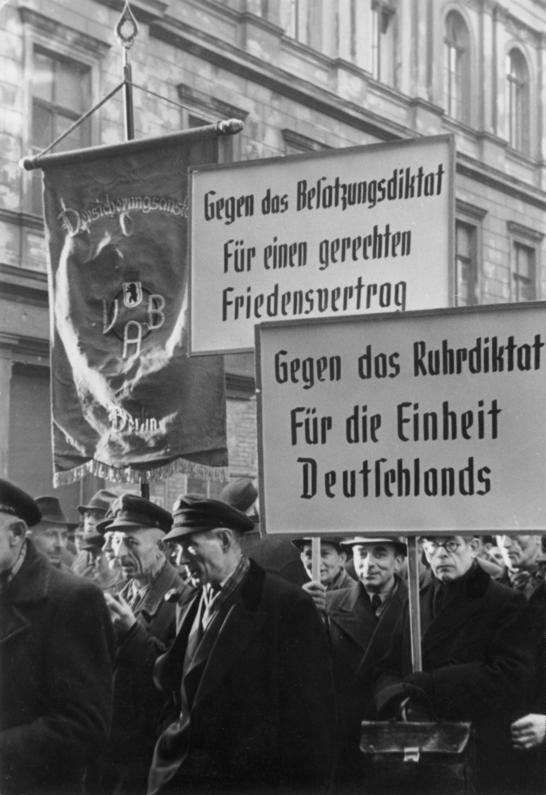
Protest in communist East Berlin against the Ruhr statute, and against the Occupation statute.

The London Agreement defines the Ruhr Area within North Rhine-Westphalia by listing 36 districts in the regions of Düsseldorf, Münster, and Arnsberg.

In Regierungsbezirk Düsseldorf:

1. Landkreis Dinslaken
2. Landkreis Düsseldorf-Mettmann
3. Landkreis Essen
4. Landkreis Geldern
5. Landkreis Krefeld-Uerdingen
6. Landkreis Moers
7. Landkreis Rees
8. Stadtkreis Düsseldorf
9. Stadtkreis Duisburg-Hamborn
10. Stadtkreis Mülheim
11. Stadtkreis Neuss
12. Stadtkreis Oberhausen
13. Stadtkreis Remscheid
14. Stadtkreis Solingen
15. Stadtkreis Wuppertal

In Regierungsbezirk Münster:

1. Landkreis Beckum
2. Landkreis Lüdinghausen
3. Landkreis Recklinghausen
4. Stadtkreis Bottrop
5. Stadtkreis Gelsenkirchen
6. Stadtkreis Gladbeck
7. Stadtkreis Recklinghausen

In Regierungsbezirk Arnsberg:

1. Landkreis Ennepe-Ruhr-Kreis
2. Landkreis Iserlohn
3. Landkreis Unna
4. Stadtkreis Bochum
5. Stadtkreis Castrop-Rauxel
6. Stadtkreis Dortmund
7. Stadtkreis Hagen
8. Stadtkreis Hamm
9. Stadtkreis Herne
10. Stadtkreis Iserlohn
11. Stadtkreis Luenen
12. Stadtkreis Wanne-Eickel
13. Stadtkreis Wattenscheid
14. Stadtkreis Witten

== See also ==
- Ruhr
- History of the Ruhr
- Industrial plans for Germany
- Morgenthau Plan
- Marshall Plan
- Schuman Declaration
