= Debellatio =

War ending in defeated nation ceasing to exist

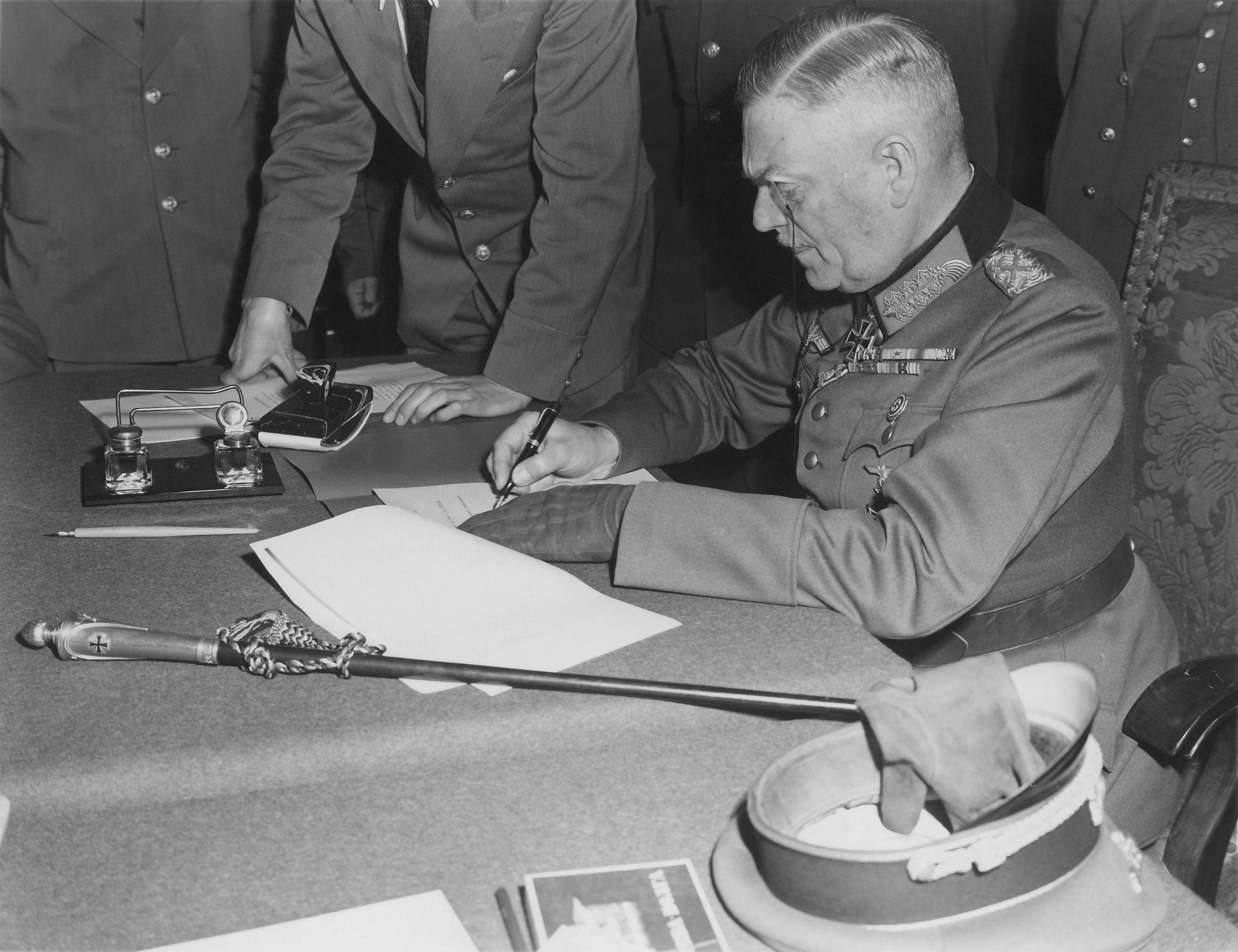
Field Marshal Wilhelm Keitel signing the unconditional surrender of the German Wehrmacht.

The term debellatio or "debellation" (Latin 'defeating, or the act of conquering or subduing', literally, 'warring (the enemy) down', from Latin bellum 'war') describes a situation in which an interstate war ends not with a peace treaty nor a ceasefire, but with the catastrophic state collapse of the losing party as a result of comprehensive military defeat, typically resulting in the disintegration of the institutions capable of issuing an authoritative instrument of surrender.

Israeli law professor Eyal Benvenisti defines debellatio as "a situation in which a party to a conflict has been totally defeated in war, its national institutions have disintegrated, and none of its allies continue to challenge the enemy militarily on its behalf."

== Examples ==
=== Carthage ===
In some cases debellation ends with a complete dissolution and annexation of the defeated state into the victor's national territory, as happened at the end of the Third Punic War with the defeat of Carthage by Rome in the 2nd century BC.

=== Confederate States of America ===
The American Civil War did not end with the issuance of a formal instrument of surrender by the Confederate States. By April 1865, the Union had occupied most of the Confederacy's national territory, including its capital, all major ports, and most of its industrial capacity. Moreover, a comprehensive Union blockade had effectively cut off the Confederacy's access to foreign trade. Militarily, the Confederate States Army was disintegrating. The Confederate States Congress ceased to function on 18 March, seven days before the fall of the capital, adjourning sine die with the last entry in its official journal being "the Confederate Congress, with its work still undone went silent forever". The Confederate cabinet continued to meet to manage the increasingly desperate war effort but was unable to stave off collapse. On 9 April, following the Appomattox campaign, Robert E. Lee surrendered the main remaining Confederate force, the Army of Northern Virginia, at Appomattox Court House.

Despite the evident futility, Confederate President Jefferson Davis continued to attempt military resistance with such forces as remained under the control of the rapidly-disintegrating Confederate government, principally the Trans-Mississippi Department; Davis intended to cross the Mississippi and make a last stand. He attempted to organize a new army but was told this was impossible. Having failed to raise any new forces, and with the surrender of the Army of Tennessee and other forces under Joseph E. Johnston on 26 April depriving what remained of the Confederate government of some 100,000 additional troops, Davis accepted the inevitable. On May 5, he convoked the Confederate cabinet, such as it remained, in Washington, Georgia, and issued a proclamation declaring the dissolution of the Confederate States. On 9 May, Union President Andrew Johnson declared that the rights of the Confederacy as a belligerent power had come to an end. After 9 May, anyone fighting in the name of the now-nonexistent Confederacy was considered not a legitimate soldier but a bandit; as Ulysses S. Grant's General Order 90 put it, "any and all persons found in arms against the United States, or who may commit acts of hostility against it ... will be regarded as guerrillas and punished with death."

Nonetheless, military resistance by the remnants of the Confederate army continued for some weeks. The last substantial engagement of the war, the Battle of Palmito Ranch, was fought on 12–13 May in Texas, and the Trans-Mississippi Department under Kirby Smith, the last major Confederate force under arms, did not surrender until 26 May. On the same day, the Camp Napoleon Council of the Confederacy's indigenous allies was held to appoint representatives to negotiate the surrender of their forces; the last of these, under Stand Watie, stood down on 23 June. The last Confederate unit to surrender was the commerce raider CSS Shenandoah, which did not learn of the surrender until 27 June, and surrendered to the British government at Rock Ferry on 6 November.

The Confederate government never issued any formal capitulation or other instrument of surrender. By the time that President Davis accepted that defeat was inevitable, the Confederate capital had been taken and the government had effectively disintegrated, with the armed forces not far behind. Joseph E. Johnston stated of the situation at the time that "[w]ith such odds against us, without the means of procuring ammunition or repairing arms, without money or credit to provide food, it was impossible to continue the war except as robbers." The proclamation of 5 May dissolving the Confederacy simply acknowledged the situation as it was; by then, there had been no functional government for some weeks (at least since the fall of Richmond); the cabinet, such as it was, managed only a rapidly shrinking group of armies.

From a legal perspective, the victorious Union considered the entire existence of the Confederacy illegal; the absence of a formal instrument of surrender from a government that did not legally exist was irrelevant. Nonetheless, on 9 May, President Andrew Johnson formally extinguished the rights of the Confederacy as a belligerent power. The war legally came to an end on 20 August 1866, though there had been no fighting for more than a year by that point.

=== Nazi Germany ===
The German Reich never issued a formal capitulation to the Allies. By 30 April 1945, the day of Adolf Hitler's suicide, Nazi Germany was on the verge of defeat. The Nazi armed forces had been repeatedly defeated in the Battle of Berlin, giving the Soviet Union a clear path into East Germany. Moreover, in the west, the United States, United Kingdom and France had pushed as far as the Czechoslovak border, and had taken the vast majority of Germany's industrial capacity. By this time, the German government controlled only a thin strip of territory running from the Austrian border through Berlin into occupied Denmark, but it was obvious to all involved that this would soon be split into northern and southern pockets. Even before Hitler's suicide, separate command points had been established for north and south.

Beginning in March, by which time Berlin was already under threat, civil servants were evacuated to resort hotels in the Bavarian and Austrian Alps – chiefly in the region of Berchtesgaden, leaving only the ministers themselves in Berlin. On 13 April, the remaining foreign embassies and the diplomatic corps were evacuated to Bad Gastein. Finally, on 20 April, all the ministers and their personal staff were ordered to make their way southwards; but as by then the roads had been cut and there were insufficient transport aircraft available (and, even had there been, the Allies had achieved near-total air superiority, making flying in a Nazi aircraft less than safe), some had perforce headed north instead.

In spite of its repeated relocations, the Military High Command continued to function, its organisation and structures having been maintained. But the same was not true of any other arm of government. Hitler's will had designated Karl Dönitz as his successor as head of state, and the Goebbels cabinet as the successor to his own. Nonetheless, Goebbels committed suicide the next day, and Dönitz appointed Lutz Graf Schwerin von Krosigk as "Leading Minister" in the Flensburg Government. Despite this, most of the members of the cabinet lacked any ministries to head. Thus the government of Germany was, at the death of Hitler, split over six centres. The Propaganda Ministry, the personal fiefdom of Joseph Goebbels, had remained with him in Berlin, as had the Nazi Party Chancellery under Martin Bormann; while the Luftwaffe High Command had relocated to Berchtesgaden, having been until his abrupt dismissal on 23 April the counterpart fiefdom of Göring. Himmler had retained his personal powerbase in the offices of the SS and security apparatus, which was established in Lübeck in the north and then relocated to Flensburg. Other government ministries and ministers were then variously located at Berchtesgaden and Dönitz's headquarters in Plön. This chaotic division meant that there was no longer a functional central government after Hitler's suicide, aside from the High Command.

The Allied position was thus that following the signing of the German Instrument of Surrender, the last functional component of the German state was extinguished. Insofar as the Flensburg Government was not recognized by any foreign power, even its erstwhile allies, the German Reich was claimed to cease to exist as a subject of international law; the Reich's dissolution was backdated to 30 April by the Allies in the Berlin Declaration, which asserted that German sovereignty became vested in the Allied Control Council from that point.

==== Competing legal theories ====
The unconditional surrender of Nazi Germany (in the strict sense, only the German Armed Forces) at the end of World War II was, at the time, accepted by most authorities as a case of debellatio, insofar as:

- There was a complete political dissolution of the German Reich, including all offices.
- The Allied Control Council exercised political control over the territory of Germany.
- Much of the territory of the German Reich was annexed (see former eastern territories of Germany)
- No unified German state remained, the German Reich being succeeded by the Federal Republic of Germany and the German Democratic Republic.

Other authorities, supported in the judgements of the German Federal Constitutional Court, have argued that a German state remained in existence from 1945 to 1949, albeit dormant and without any institutional or organisational component, on the basis that:

- Most of the territory that made up Germany before the Anschluss was not annexed.
- A German population still existed and was recognised as having German nationality.
- German institutions such as courts never ceased to exist even though the Allied Control Council governed the territory.
- Eventually, the Federal Republic of Germany, a German government, regained full sovereignty over all German territory that had not been annexed (see German reunification).
- The Federal Republic of Germany sees itself as the legal continuation of the German Reich.

The official position of the Allied-occupied government as well all subsequent German governments since has been and remains that the Nazi regime was "illegal", with laws and verdicts imposed during the Third Reich regularly being declared facially invalid. The Allies did not consider the German people and the Nazis indistinguishable, rather the opposite. Following the surrender, the Nazi party was and remains to this day outlawed; various restrictions were imposed on former Nazi party members, including bans on running for or holding public office, though these laws were later scaled back. Following the end of the Allied occupation, West Germany assumed a certain degree of responsibility for the atrocities committed by Nazi Germany and agreed to make major reparation payments to its victims.

=== Others ===
- Republic of Venice
- Papal States
- Austria-Hungary (see Treaty of Trianon and Treaty of Saint Germain)
- South Vietnam

== See also ==
- Disarmed Enemy Forces
- Laws of war
- Legal status of Germany
- Total war
- War termination
