= State-War-Navy Coordinating Committee =

US federal government committee

The State-War-Navy Coordinating Committee (SWNCC, "swink") was a United States federal government committee created in December 1944 to address the political-military issues involved in the occupation of the Axis powers following the end of World War II.

SWNCC was an important precursor to the National Security Council, and represents perhaps the most successful integration of military and civilian assets in the history of U.S. foreign policy. As a result, it has received renewed scrutiny in the wake of the Iraq War as the U.S. government attempts to overhaul its interagency national security system.

== Origins of SWNCC ==
During World War II, interagency coordination had been largely informal and mediated by president Roosevelt, but recognizing the need for deeper integration, the secretary of state, secretary of war, and secretary of the Navy began holding weekly meetings to work through shared problems. However, the so-called "Committee of Three" had no specific mandate or authority, and this weakness became apparent as the war moved toward its conclusions and the details of occupation planning began to occupy the various departments.

As soon as he became Secretary of State, Edward Stettinius sent a letter to war secretary Henry Stimson and Navy secretary James Forrestal proposing that they create a jointly managed secretariat to plan the occupations and achieve full integration of U.S. foreign policy. The secretariat was headed by Roosevelt favorite, Assistant Secretary of War John J. McCloy.

== Activities ==
SWNCC's plans for the occupation of Europe and Japan were aimed at anticipating and addressing the issues that might confront U.S. forces tasked with occupying and running former enemy states. SWNCC brought together the top experts in the U.S. government and the academy to work on all aspects of the plan.

For instance, one of the key decisions which faced the team – the status of the Emperor of Japan – was studied by academic-turned-bureaucrat Hugh Borton. After the war, when Borton returned to the academy, he observed that his 1943 memo recommending the retention of Hirohito was largely unchanged as it passed through the planning process and subsequent implementation by Supreme Commander of the Allied Powers Douglas MacArthur.

The SWNCC began its activities by reviewing and compiling existing work on occupation strategy, and in many cases summoning the responsible experts to participate in the committee. Within the U.S. government, planning for the occupation of Japan actually predated the attack on Pearl Harbor, so there were significant resources for the newly created organization.

SWNCC in essence took academic and government research and used it to create a detailed set of policies which included the views of the military and civilian bureaucracies and which would be implemented by the military government once it took control.

== Institutional practices ==
SWNCC consisted of a secretariat which held regular meetings and a number of working groups tasked to address specific problems and present their findings to the committee. Both the working groups and the full committee operated on a strict consensus principle. Any issues which could not be resolved between the participants was advanced to higher levels of leadership. Of the 750 issues considered by the SWNCC, most were resolved at or below the assistant secretary level and only six cases were forwarded to the White House for final decisions.
