= Telcon =

In air traffic control, a Telcon refers to the routine telephone conferences that take place between Traffic Management Coordinators at different FAA facilities throughout the day. The telcon usually includes the Operations Plan (OP), equipment outages, internal initiatives, terminal constraints, route closure/recovery information, anticipated Traffic Management Initiatives (TMI) necessary to manage the system, and/or other issues which may impact operations (such as staffing or special events).

== See also ==
Teleconference
