= Berlin Declaration (1945) =

1945 historical document

Declaration regarding the defeat of Germany and the assumption of supreme authority with respect to Germany by the Governments of the United States of America, the Union of Soviet Socialist Republics, the United Kingdom and the Provisional Government of the French Republic
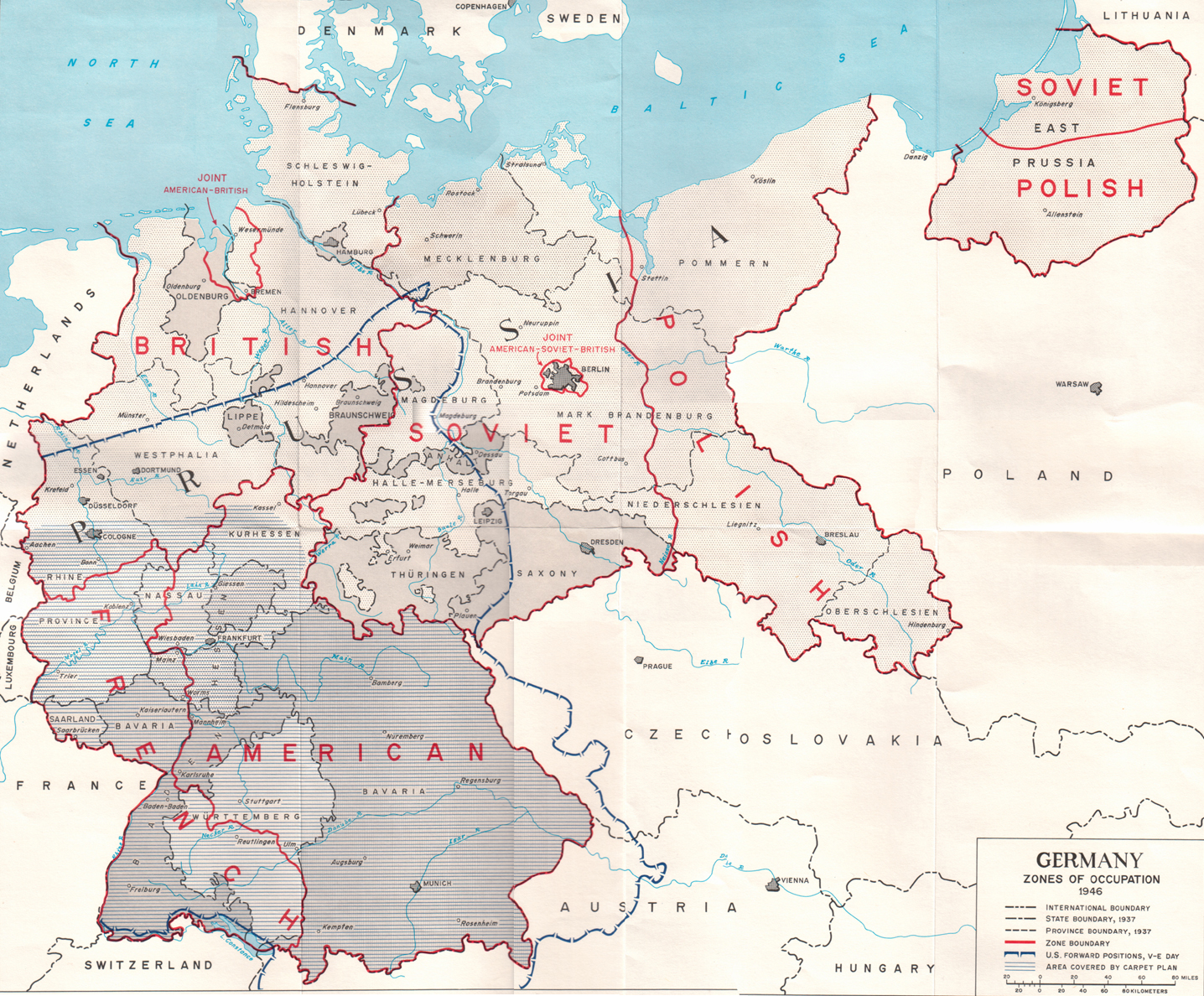
- Occupation zones of Germany, 1945
- Signed: 5 June 1945; 81 years ago
- Location: Berlin-Karlshorst, Allied-occupied Germany
- Signatories: (United States) Dwight Eisenhower; (Soviet Union) Georgy Zhukov; (United Kingdom) Bernard Montgomery; (Provisional Government of the French Republic) Jean de Lattre de Tassigny
- Parties: United States; Soviet Union; United Kingdom; France
- Language: English, Russian, French, German

The Berlin Declaration (German: Berliner Erklärung/Deklaration) of 5 June 1945, or the Declaration regarding the defeat of Germany, (Note: Officially, the "Declaration regarding the defeat of Germany and the assumption of supreme authority with respect to Germany by the Governments of the United States of America, the Union of Soviet Socialist Republics, the United Kingdom and the Provisional Government of the French Republic".) had the governments of the United States, the Soviet Union, the United Kingdom, and France, acting on behalf of the Allies of World War II, jointly assume de jure "supreme authority" over Germany after its military defeat and asserted the legitimacy of their joint determination of issues regarding its administration and boundaries prior to the forthcoming Potsdam Conference.

== Background ==
The German Instrument of Surrender of 8 May 1945 had provided only for the military capitulation of German armed forces, the German signatories being representatives of the German High Command. Consequently, full civil provisions for the unconditional surrender of the German state remained without explicit formal basis. The Allies had agreed through the European Advisory Commission a comprehensive text of unconditional surrender, which was intended to be used in the potential circumstances of Nazi power being overthrown within Germany by military or civil authorities. A post-Nazi government would then be set up in Germany and seek an armistice. In the event, Nazi power remained to the last; Adolf Hitler killed himself in the ruins of Berlin on 30 April 1945; and the claims of Karl Dönitz, his nominated successor, to have established a civil government at Flensburg were unacceptable to the Allies. Therefore, the previously-agreed surrender text, redrafted as a declaration and with an extended explanatory preamble, was adopted unilaterally by the four Allied Powers as the Declaration regarding the defeat of Germany on 5 June 1945. It spelled out the Allied position that after the gross criminal abuses of Nazism, and in the circumstances of complete defeat, Germany now had no government or central administration and that the vacated civil authority in Germany had consequently been assumed as a condominium of the four Allied Representative Powers on behalf of the Allied Governments overall, an authority later constituted into the Allied Control Council.

The principle that hostilities against Germany should continue until its armed forces laid down their arms on the basis of unconditional surrender had been adopted by the Allies in the Moscow Declarations of October 1943, which was also stated that after a German surrender, any individuals participating in atrocities within territories under German occupation would be returned to those territories to be judged and punished, and the entire leadership of Nazi Germany, classed as "criminals," would be seized and "punished by the joint decision of the government of the Allies," a formula that was understood as indicating summary execution without trial, which remained British policy until April 1945. The principles of the Moscow Declarations were to be elaborated in the proceedings of the European Advisory Commission to specify that the Allies would undertake that both Nazism and German militarism would be eradicated from Europe. In that respect, the British War Cabinet came to agree with the American proposal that tribunals of justice should be established with the consequence that all individual Nazi leaders would now be tried as criminals, and all Nazi institutions, agencies, and associations would be declared "criminal organizations," with proved membership being grounds for judicial penalties. Since, in practice, by May 1945, such Nazi bodies were the only functioning institutions of German civil administration, the effect was to designate the entire civil apparatus of state power in Germany and all employment within it as "criminal" activity in the service of the Nazi Party on the basis that "the Nazi state was structurally, in its genesis and throughout its existence, a vast criminal enterprise."

Nevertheless, although the Nazi state was designated as a criminal enterprise with no valid claim to exercise civil authority in Germany, the "criminal" designation was not extended by the Allies to the German High Command and the members of the armed forces. Generals in the service of the Nazi state remained generals, soldiers remained soldiers, and military orders issued by the German High Command were valid orders with legal effect right up to 8 May 1945 although the counterpart civil state of Germany was considered already extinct. It followed that the representatives of the German High Command had been legally entitled to sign the Instrument of Surrender in Berlin and that their orders to the army, navy, and air force to lay down their arms were valid orders, which were properly enforceable by the procedures of military discipline.

== Terms ==
The preamble of the declaration asserted both German responsibility for the war and the complete legal extinction of Nazi Germany consequent on the unconditional surrender of all German armed forces and the total absence of any German central government authority. However, the text of the articles of the Declaration maintained, in several places, the continued existence of a German national people and territory, which, for the purpose of the Declaration was taken to be as defined on 31 December 1937 (after the 1935 Saar referendum and before the 1938 Anschluss), subject to the four signatory powers also asserting their authority to determine the future boundaries of Germany. That claimed authority to determine the boundaries of Germany would shortly be exercised in the incorporation of eastern territories into Poland and the Soviet Union and the short-lived creation of the Saar Protectorate in the West. The preamble also confirmed the four nominated representatives of the governments of the United States of America, the Union of Soviet Socialist Republics, the United Kingdom and the Provisional Government of the French Republic as the "Allied Representatives," which would from then on exercise supreme civil and military authority within German territory and over former German forces. Otherwise, the text of the declaration was that prepared for—but not eventually used in—the German Instrument of Surrender of 8 May 1945, in the form previously agreed by the European Advisory Commission, but not including the proposed dismemberment clause, which was added to the agreed surrender instrument at the Yalta.

The Allies asserted that their assumption of sovereign powers within Germany would not effect its annexation. The declaration consisted of 15 articles, the first eight being concerned with the capitulation of the German armed forces and the surrender to the Allies of military equipment and intelligence assets. By July 1945, those actions had largely been completed.

The key articles for the future governance of Germany were therefore Article 11, which provided for the arrest and trial by the Allies of Nazi leaders and other suspected war criminals, and Article 13, which provided almost unrestricted authority to the Allied Powers to direct German civil, economic, and legal structures in the zones under their control. That article was extensively applied to effect the de-Nazification of public institutions and economic enterprises at all levels of German society, to extract reparations and in the Soviet zone also to effect a major programme of land reform by redistributing expropriated rural land from large prewar landed estates to the ownership of surviving tenant occupiers and expellee farmers from formerly-eastern parts of Germany.

== Legal status in international law ==
The Allies then maintained that with the death of Adolf Hitler on 30 April 1945, the former German state ceased to exist, with its historic institutions and organisation having been expunged under the criminal assault of Nazi power, and any continuing sovereign identity for Germany as a whole was now represented solely by the Allied Control Council. Under the terms of the Potsdam Agreement, the Allies stated their intention that the exercise of full German sovereignty by the Allied Control Council would be one of tutelage and of limited duration, the Council of Foreign Ministers being tasked with preparing the terms for an eventual peace treaty and final settlement of the war, and with establishing through the Control Council a wholly new German Government and state adequate for the purpose of accepting that settlement.

The Allied contention that the German Reich no longer existed was, however, challenged in legal and political debate, with a number of scholars maintaining that the legal extinction of a state could not be achieved except by formal annexation of its peoples and territory into another state and that since that option had been explicitly forsworn in the Berlin Agreement, the German national state must in some form be considered as having survived the collapse of Nazi Germany independently of the Allied Control Council.

Postwar legal debate also challenged the powers assumed by the Allies in Articles 11 and 13 to effect radical change to the civic, legal, and economic structures of Germany in direct conflict with the provisions of the Hague Conventions of 1899 and 1907 on the powers and responsibilities constraining military occupation in wartime. The Allies maintained that the conventions could not and did not apply in the circumstances of the occupation of Germany, as the complete and lasting elimination of Nazism and its crimes against humanity and German militarism in general were their major wartime objectives. Indeed, in October 1944, General Eisenhower, in his 'Proclamation number 1' concerning the intended Allied Occupation of Germany, had promised the total obliteration of Nazism and militarism, the suspension of the German legal system, and the assumption by the Allies of supreme executive, legislative and judicial power.

Subsequent to German reunification in 1990, the descendants of expropriated prewar landowners challenged the legal basis of Allied occupying power in respect of the Soviet-instigated East German land reform and sought through the German courts to dispossess the descendants of the postwar beneficiaries of the reform programme or otherwise to be granted compensation at current market value. After a succession of four cases was brought before the Federal Constitutional Court over a decade, an appeal was eventually made to the European Court of Human Rights in 2005, which found in favour of the legality of the Allied occupation. The postwar occupation of Germany was found to have been 'an occupation sui generis', which had 'conferred powers of sovereignty' on the Allied Powers.

== Signatories ==
The declaration was signed by the Allied commanders-in-chief:

- Georgy Zhukov for the Soviet Union
- Dwight D. Eisenhower for the United States
- Bernard Montgomery for the United Kingdom
- Jean de Lattre de Tassigny for France

Eisenhower arrived in Berlin on 5 June expecting to sign the declaration and return to Frankfurt that day. Zhukov refused to sign because, he said, Article 10 required Soviets to arrest Japanese nationals found in Germany although the USSR was not at war with Japan. Eisenhower ordered the removal of the clause, surprising Zhukov who needed approval from Moscow, and the four commanders each signed four copies of the declaration in English, French, Russian, and German as the press took photographs.

== Further developments ==
The military forces of the Western Allies had pulled back westwards from the original "line of contact" by transferring the administration of the vacated territories to the Soviet occupation zone and meanwhile took over administrative responsibilities from Soviet forces for their respective sectors of Berlin. Subsequently, the Potsdam Agreement of 1 August 1945 confirmed the establishment of British, American and French zones of occupation and set the boundary between Poland and Germany at the Oder-Neisse line. The former German territories east of the line now came under Polish and Soviet (Kaliningrad Oblast) administrations, pending the final apportionment of territories in a future Final German Peace Treaty. The treaty was delayed for ideological and political differences among the Allied Powers and was not finally ratified until 1991, when the Treaty on the Final Settlement With Respect to Germany became effective and formally ended the Occupation of Germany.

After the signing Eisenhower, believing that through the European Advisory Commission the four commanders were now the Allied Control Council, asked whether their staff could begin to act as such. Zhukov refused, as the four powers' forces had not redeployed to their own zones. The council was established on 30 August 1945 to execute supreme governmental power over Allied-occupied Germany, which no longer included the German eastern territories. In its initial proceedings, the council assumed itself to be the sole repository of German state sovereignty especially in respect of external relations, but it largely left each of the Allied Powers to administer its own occupation zones as it saw fit. The functioning of the council proved, however, to be severely compromised by obstruction from the Allied Powers represented on it. Initially France, which had not been invited to the Potsdam Conference and refused to be bound by the Potsdam Agreement, and then the Soviet Union in 1948 walked out of the Allied Control Council, which prevented it from meeting again until 1971 and 1990.

== Commemoration ==
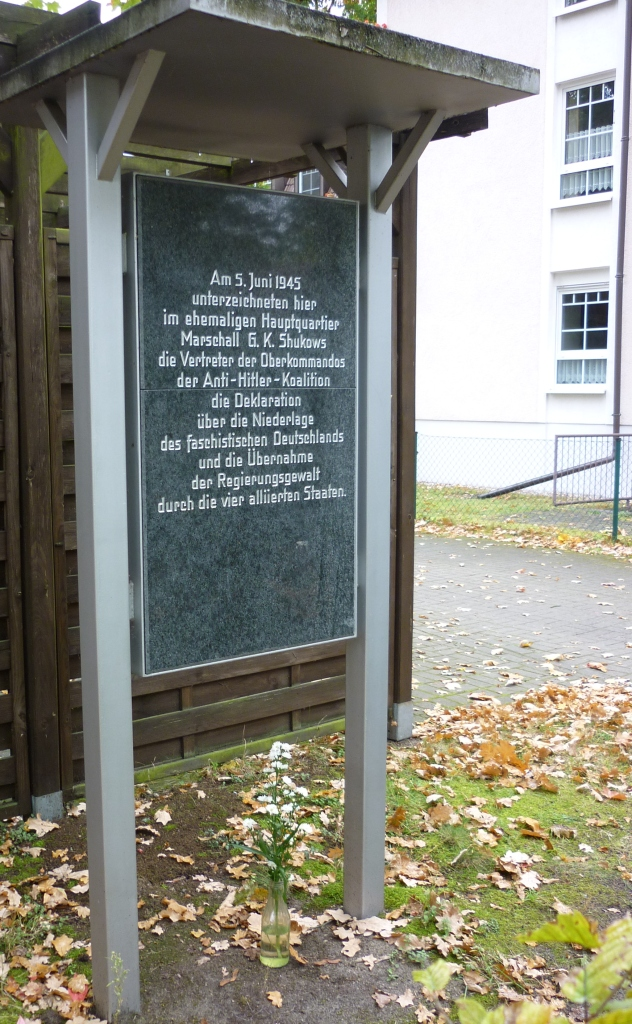
Memorial tablet marking Soviet Marshal Zhukov's leadership at signing of the Allied agreement on the military occupation of Germany

A monument (pictured right) was erected at the site in the Wendenschloss district of Berlin-Köpenick on Niebergall Street. Translated from German, it reads:

On 5 June 1945 in the former headquarters of Marshal G. K. Zhukov here, the representatives of the high commands of the Anti-Hitler Coalition signed the Declaration of the defeat of Nazi Germany and the assumption of governmental authority through the four allied states.

== See also ==
- Legal status of Germany – Legal status of the German Reich after 1945
- Treaty on the Final Settlement with Respect to Germany
