= Occupation statute =

Treaty defining the relationship between West Germany and the Allied High Commission

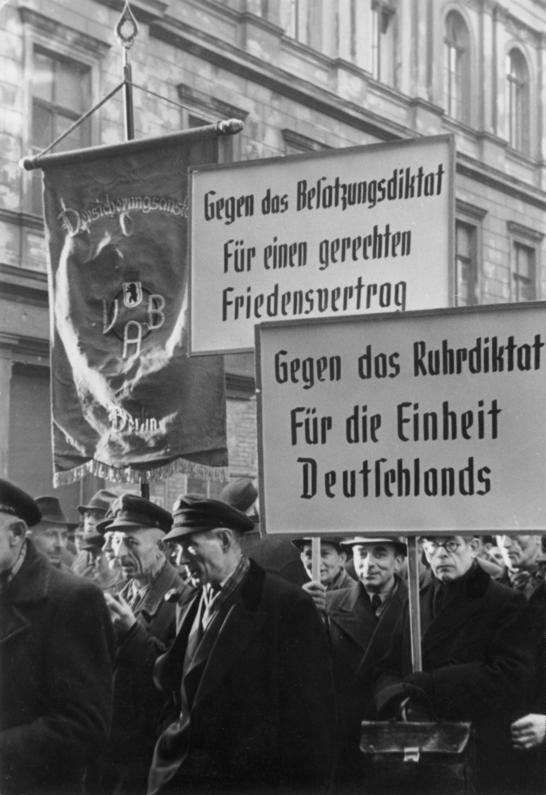
Protest against The Ruhr Agreement, and against the occupation statute.

The Occupation Statute of Germany (German: Besatzungsstatut) of April 10, 1949 specified the roles and responsibilities of the newly created government of the Federal Republic of Germany (West Germany) and the Allied High Commission. It was drawn up by American, British, and French representatives and was in force until the Treaties of Paris (1954) came into force on May 5, 1955.

The statute's authors were United States Secretary of State Dean Acheson, British Secretary of State for Foreign and Commonwealth Affairs Ernest Bevin, and the French Prime Minister Robert Schuman, who deliberated for eight days in intensive conferences in Washington, D.C. It gave the Federal Republic conditional sovereignty and admitted it into the Marshall Plan organization as an equal partner. The Allies retained the right to keep occupational forces in the country and complete control over disarmament, demilitarization, related fields of scientific research, war reparations, the Ruhr, decartelization, foreign trade, the level of industrial production, displaced persons and refugees, protection, prestige and security of the occupying forces, foreign affairs, and foreign trade and exchange. The Federal Republic could only act in these spheres with Allied permission.

Additionally, the Basic Law (constitution) could only be amended with the unanimous consent of the Allies, and the Allies had the right to veto any legislation that ran counter to the Basic Law or occupation policies. The Allies also had the power to resume full-fledged occupation in the event of an emergency.

The Allies' representatives asked the Parliamentary council, which was in the process of drafting the Basic Law, to accept the statute. Although it met resistance from the SPD, the council accepted the Occupation Statute.

In 1951, chancellor Konrad Adenauer succeeded in gaining membership for West Germany in the European Coal and Steel Community, which later served as the core of the European Economic Community, the precursor of the European Union. In that same year the Americans, British, and French agreed to a revision of the Occupation Statute that substantially increased the internal authority of the Federal Republic. Skillfully exploiting the Western fears of a communist assault on Europe, which had been awakened by the Korean War, Adenauer gained further concessions from the Western occupying powers in return for his agreement to rearm West Germany within the context of a western European defense system. In 1955 West Germany became a full member of the North Atlantic Treaty Organization (NATO) and gained sovereignty over its foreign relations as the Occupation Statute expired.

== See also ==
- Allied Control Council
- Declaration Regarding the Defeat of Germany
- Allied Occupation Zones in Germany
- Petersberg Protocol of November 1949. Signed between the three Allies and Konrad Adenauer, the first Chancellor of the Federal Republic of Germany.
