= Petersberg Agreement =

Treaty restoring some sovereign powers to Germany after WW2

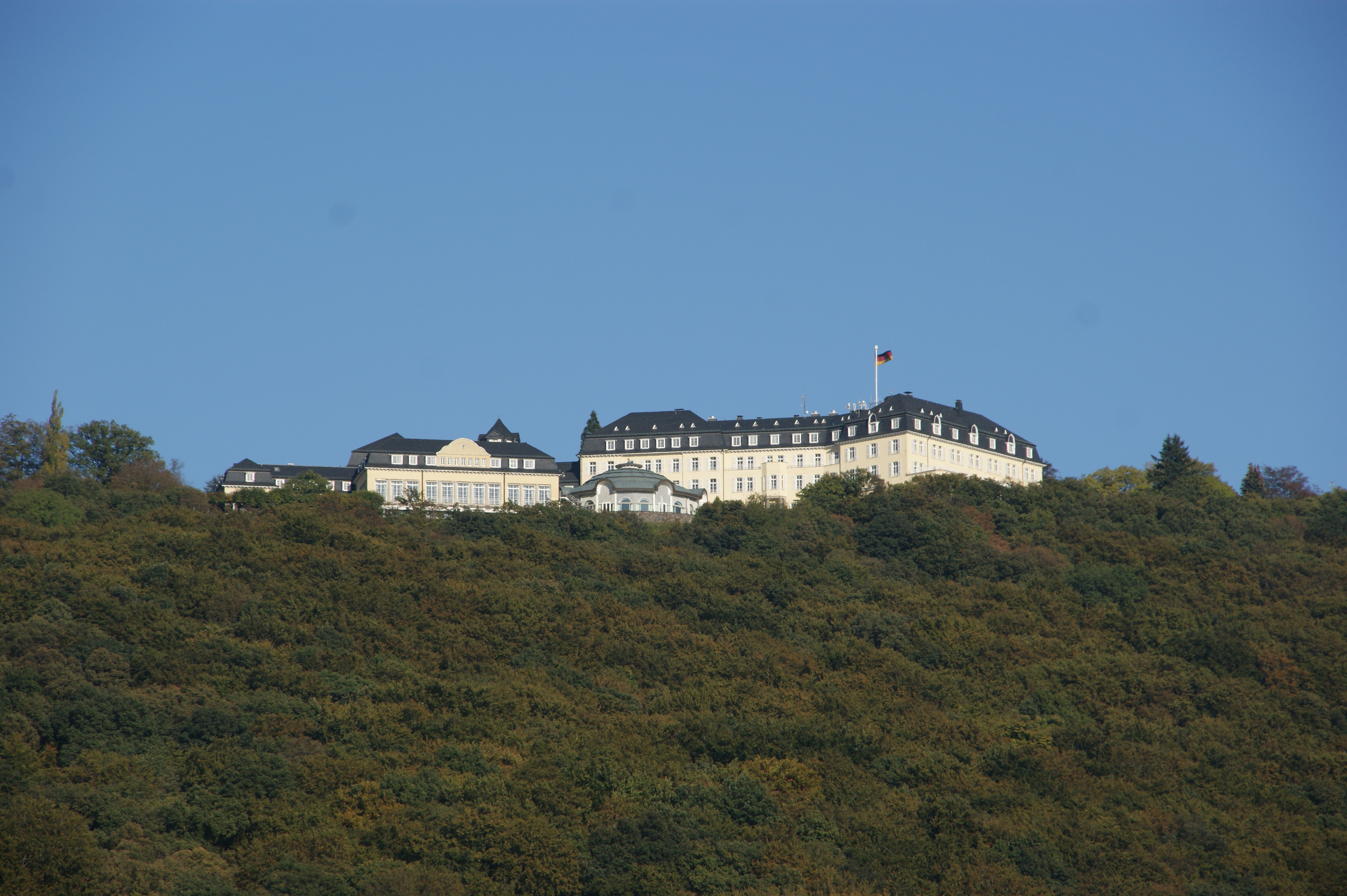
Hotel Petersberg near Bonn

The Petersberg Agreement is an international treaty that extended the rights of the government of West Germany vis-a-vis the occupying forces of the United Kingdom, France, and the United States. It is viewed as the first major step of West Germany towards sovereignty. It was signed by West German Chancellor Konrad Adenauer and Allied High Commissioners Brian Hubert Robertson (United Kingdom), André François-Poncet (France), and John J. McCloy (United States) on 22 November 1949. The Hotel Petersberg, near Bonn, was the seat of the High Commissioners and the place of signature. The agreement was the first modification of the Occupation Statute.

== Terms ==
- West Germany was permitted to join the Council of Europe as an associate member.
- West Germany agreed to sign a bilateral agreement with the U.S. regarding Marshall Plan aid (see next section).
- West Germany agreed to send delegates to the International Authority for the Ruhr, effectively accepting some international control of the Ruhr district (see next section).
- West Germany agreed to remain demilitarised, without armed forces of any kind, and to support the work of the occupation authorities in this respect.
- West Germany was permitted to engage in international trade, as well as to establish consular relations. (The creation of a foreign office was still prohibited.)
- West Germany agreed to follow the principles of liberty, tolerance and humanity and to prevent any reviving of totalitarian efforts.
- West Germany agreed to implement legislation for the sake of decartelisation in accordance with the occupation statute.
- West Germany was permitted to construct ocean-going ships with restricted capabilities.
- The industrial dismantling programme was modified by the removal of a select number of industrial plants from the dismantling list.
- The West German request for an end to the state of war was noted, but not granted.

== Context ==
Adenauer was heavily criticized in parliament for his signing of the agreement, particularly due to the Ruhr issue.

The International Authority for the Ruhr was established on 28 April 1949. Of the 15 votes, 3 were assigned to the German state, although voted as a block by a representative of the occupation authority. By agreeing to join the control council of the authority, West Germany gained control of those three votes, but also accepted the control of the authority over West Germany's main industrial center. In the following debate in parliament, Adenauer stated:

The Allies have told me that dismantling would be stopped only if I satisfy the Allied desire for security, Does the Socialist Party want dismantling to go on to the bitter end?

The opposition leader Kurt Schumacher responded by labelling Adenauer "Chancellor of the Allies".

The first treaty with a foreign power that West Germany was allowed to sign was the unpopular Marshall Plan agreement specified in the treaty. Under U.S. pressure, the agreement was also made into federal law. Although it gave the Germans greater freedom in how to spend the funds, it also gave the U.S. greater powers to interfere in German economic matters, as well as requiring West Germany to subsidize West Berlin which was under occupation and not part of West Germany. The treaty also mandated deliveries from Germany to the U.S. of goods in short supply in the U.S.

The treaty stated that for practical reasons the state of war with Germany could not be ended as requested by the Germans. According to the press, the state of war was maintained because "the U.S. wants to retain a legal basis for keeping a U.S. force in Western Germany".

In 1952, members of the German parliament went to court to challenge the legality of the agreement.

== See also ==
- Bonn–Paris conventions were signed in 1952 and came into force after the 1955 ratification. The conventions put an end to the Allied occupation of West Germany.
- Treaty on the Final Settlement with Respect to Germany
