= Council of Foreign Ministers =

Series of international conferences

Council of Foreign Ministers was an organisation agreed upon at the Potsdam Conference in 1945 and announced in the Potsdam Agreement and dissolved upon the entry into force of the Treaty on the Final Settlement with Respect to Germany in 1991.

The Potsdam Agreement specified that the Council would be composed of the Foreign Ministers of the United Kingdom, the Soviet Union, China, France, and the United States. It would normally meet in London (at Lancaster House) and the first meeting was to take place no later than 1 September 1945. As the immediate important task, the Council was authorised to draw up treaties of peace with Italy, Romania, Bulgaria, Hungary and Finland, and to propose settlements of territorial questions outstanding on the termination of the war in Europe. Also, the Council should prepare a peace settlement for Germany to be accepted when a "government adequate for the purpose is established".

== List of meetings ==
Location	Date
London	1945, Sep
Moscow	1945, Dec
Paris	1946, Apr–July
New York	1946, Nov–Dec
Moscow	1947, Mar–Apr
London	1947, Nov–Dec
Paris	1948, Sep
Paris	1949, May–Jun
Berlin	1954, Jan–Feb
Geneva	1955
Geneva	1959
Berlin	1971
Berlin	1990
Source: Columbia Encyclopedia

== Topics of discussion ==
The ministers met two times in 1945: first at the London Conference of Foreign Ministers and then in December at the Moscow Conference of Foreign Ministers, and in 1946 at the Paris Conference of Foreign Ministers.

The London conference was marred by a dispute between the Soviet Union and the United States over the occupation of Japan and little of substance was accomplished. The Moscow conference was more productive; it agreed to the preparation of peace treaties with Italy, Romania, Bulgaria, Hungary and Finland; the creation of an eleven–member Far Eastern Commission and a four–member Allied Council for Japan. It also agreed to the establishment by the United Nations of a commission for the control of atomic energy, as well as a number of other lesser issues brought about by the end of World War II. France joined the Council in 1946 and at the Paris Conference the final wording for the Paris Peace Treaties of 1947 was agreed. The outstanding issue of Free Territory of Trieste was resolved at the New York meeting of the Foreign Ministers in November–December 1946.

In 1947 the ministers met twice first in Moscow, in the Spring, and again in the Autumn in London, but by this time the Cold War was gathering pace and they failed to agree on a peace treaty for Germany and Austria. They did however agree to the dissolution of the free state of Prussia.

At a meeting in Paris in September 1948, the ministers failed to agree on what to do with the former Italian colonies. The council was revived in 1949 and met in Paris, during May and June, where they agreed to the ending of the Soviet blockade of Berlin, but failed to agree on German reunification. The Berlin meeting in 1954 ended in deadlock, but the following year in Vienna, they agreed on a peace treaty for Austria (the Austrian State Treaty).

Meetings by the foreign ministers in Geneva, the first at the Geneva Summit in July 1955 and again a year later failed to reach an agreement on German reunification, or European security and disarmament. The third meeting in 1959 again failed to reach an agreement over Germany. The Western powers would only agree to a comprehensive peace treaty with a Germany reunited under a democratic government, not treaties with the governments of East Germany and West Germany. They also refused to agree with a Soviet proposal to a change in the status of Berlin from an occupied city into a demilitarised one.

In 1971 the foreign ministers of the four powers signed the Four Power Agreement on Berlin (effective from June 1972). It regularised trade and travel relations between West Berlin and West Germany and aimed at improving communications between East Berlin and West Berlin. The Soviet Union stipulated, however, that West Berlin would not be incorporated into West Germany. That meeting also produced the Basic Treaty (effective June 1973) which recognised two German states, and the two countries pledged to respect one another's sovereignty. Under the terms of the treaty, diplomatic missions were to be exchanged and commercial, tourist, cultural, and communications relations established. Under the agreement and the treaty, both German states joined the United Nations (September 1973).

After the fall of the Berlin Wall, on 12 September 1990 the Treaty on the Final Settlement With Respect to Germany was signed by the four powers and the two German governments, which was the final peace treaty of World War II and the restoration of German sovereignty. This allowed German reunification to take place on 3 October 1990 and the reunited country became fully sovereign again on 15 March 1991.
