= Aftermath of World War II =

Events after the end of the war in 1945

- 1945–1947
World War II	Announcement of the Truman Doctrine and the beginning of the Cold War
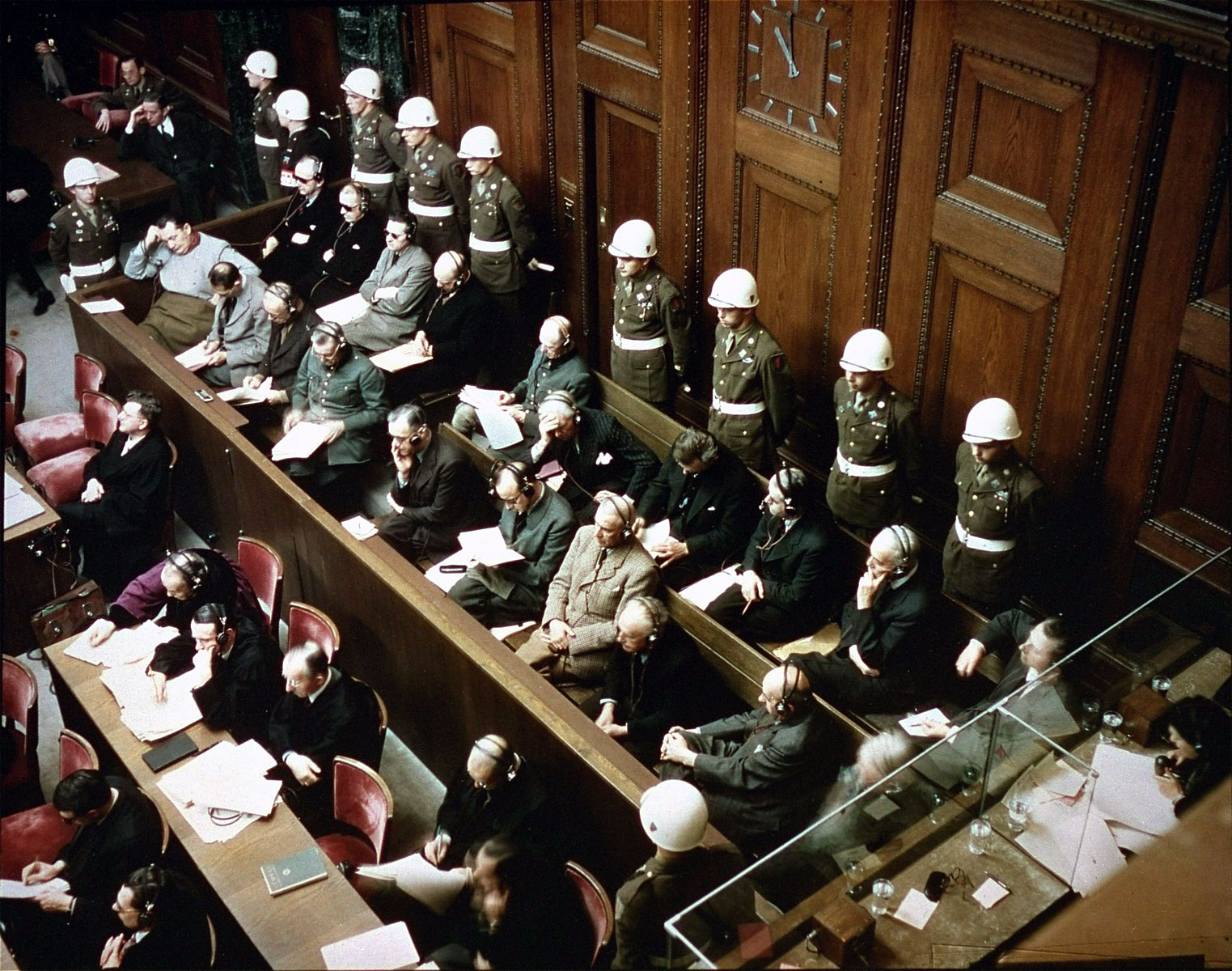
- View of the defendants in the dock at the International Military Tribunal trial of war criminals in Nuremberg, Bavaria
- Including: Cold War
- President: Harry Truman
- Key events: Nuremberg trials * Creation of the United Nations * Potsdam Conference * Israeli independence * Partition of India

The aftermath of World War II saw the rise of two global superpowers, the United States and the Soviet Union. The aftermath of World War II was also defined by the rising threat of nuclear warfare, the creation and implementation of the United Nations as an intergovernmental organization, and the decolonization of Asia, Oceania, South America and Africa by European and East Asian powers, most notably by the United Kingdom, France, and Japan.

Once allies during World War II, the United States and the Soviet Union became competitors on the world stage and engaged in the Cold War, so called because it never resulted in overt, declared total war between the two powers. It was instead characterized by espionage, political subversion, and proxy wars. Western Europe was rebuilt through the American Marshall Plan, whereas Central and Eastern Europe fell under the Soviet sphere of influence and eventually behind an "Iron Curtain." Europe was divided into a U.S.-led Western Bloc and a Soviet-led Eastern Bloc. Internationally, alliances with the two blocs gradually shifted, with some nations trying to stay out of the Cold War through the Non-Aligned Movement. The Cold War also saw a nuclear arms race between the two superpowers, and part of the reason that the Cold War never became a "hot" war was that the Soviet Union and the United States had nuclear deterrents against each other, leading to a mutually assured destruction standoff.

As a consequence of the war, the Allies created the United Nations, an organization for international cooperation and diplomacy, similar to the League of Nations. Members of the United Nations agreed to outlaw wars of aggression in an attempt to avoid a third world war. The devastated great powers of Western Europe formed the European Coal and Steel Community, which later evolved into the European Economic Community and ultimately into the current European Union. This effort primarily began as an attempt to avoid another war between West Germany and France through economic cooperation and integration, and a common market for important natural resources.

The end of the war opened the way for decolonization, as independence was granted to India and Pakistan (from the UK), Vietnam, Laos, Cambodia, French India and Vanuatu (from France), Indonesia (from the Netherlands), the Philippines (from the US), and several Arab nations from specific Mandates granted to European states by the defunct League of Nations. The State of Israel was also established following the disestablishment of the British-ruled Mandatory Palestine and the 1948 Palestine War. Nations in sub-Saharan Africa achieved independence in the 1950s to 1970s.

The aftermath of World War II saw the rise of communist influence in East and Southeast Asia. The People's Republic of China was founded after the Chinese Communist Party (CCP) emerged victorious from the Chinese Civil War in 1949, and the First Indochina War was fought between the Viet Minh government and France after the Japanese retreat. The Korean War led to the division of the Korean Peninsula between the communist North Korea and the Western-aligned South Korea.

== Immediate effects of World War II ==
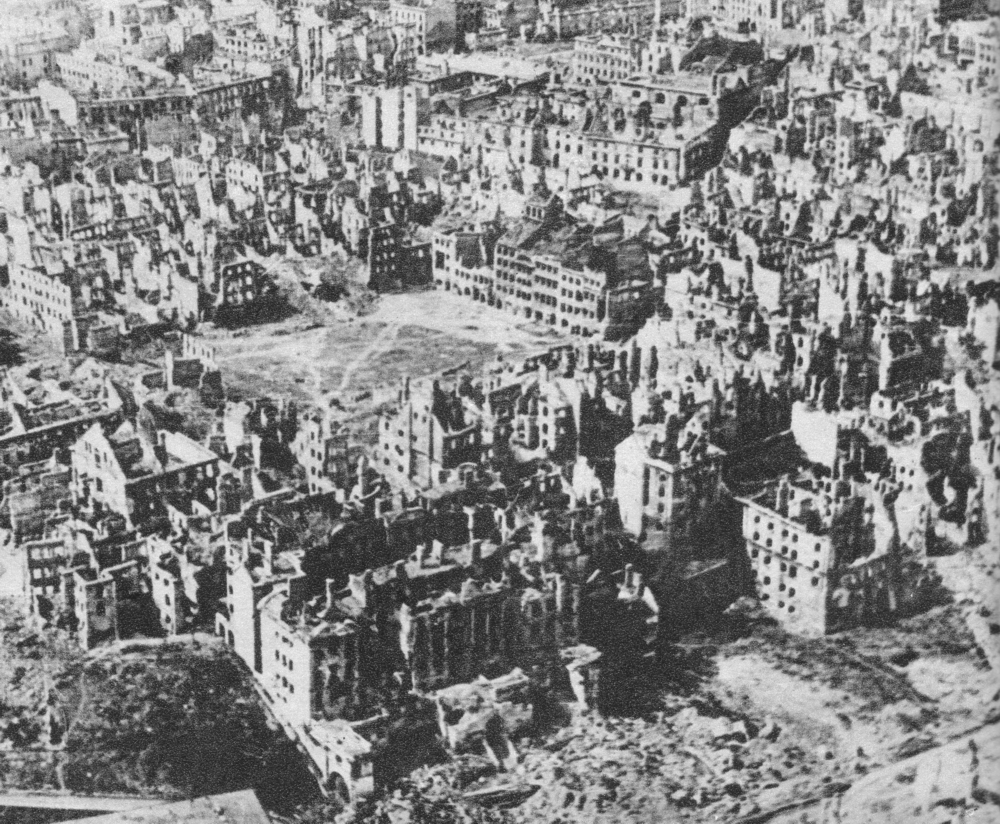
Warsaw, Poland: Result of the war.

At the end of the war in Europe, tens of millions of people had been killed and even more were displaced, European economies had collapsed, and much of Europe's industrial infrastructure had been destroyed. In response, in 1947 US Secretary of State George C. Marshall devised the "European Recovery Program," which became known as the Marshall Plan. Under the plan, from 1948 to 1952 the United States government allocated $13 billion (US$150 billion in 2025 dollars) for the reconstruction of affected countries in Western Europe.

=== United Kingdom ===
The British Empire ended early on in the war, by the end of the war, the economy of the United Kingdom was one of severe privation, as a significant portion of its national wealth had been consumed by the war effort. Until the introduction in 1941 of Lend-Lease aid from the United States, the UK had been spending its assets to purchase American equipment including aircraft and ships—over £437 million (equivalent to some £29 billion in 2024) on aircraft alone. Lend-Lease came just before its reserves were exhausted. Britain had placed 55% of its total labour force into war production.

In the spring of 1945, after the final defeat of Germany, the Labour Party withdrew from the wartime coalition government to oust Winston Churchill, forcing a general election. Following a landslide victory, Labour held more than 60% of the seats in the House of Commons and formed a new government on 26 July 1945 under Clement Attlee, who had been Deputy Prime Minister in the coalition government.

Britain's war debt was described by some in the U.S. administration as a "millstone round the neck of the British economy." Although there were suggestions for an international conference to tackle the issue, in August 1945 the U.S. announced unexpectedly that the Lend-Lease programme was to end immediately.

The abrupt withdrawal of U.S. Lend-Lease support to Britain on 2 September 1945 dealt a severe blow to the plans of the new government. It was only with the completion of the Anglo-American loan by the United States to Great Britain on 15 July 1946 that some measure of economic stability was restored. However, the loan was made primarily to support British overseas expenditure in the immediate post-war years and not to implement the Labour government's policies for domestic welfare reforms and the nationalisation of key industries. Although the loan was agreed on reasonable terms, its conditions included what proved to be damaging fiscal conditions for sterling. From 1946 to 1948, the UK introduced bread rationing, which it had never done during the war.

=== Soviet Union ===
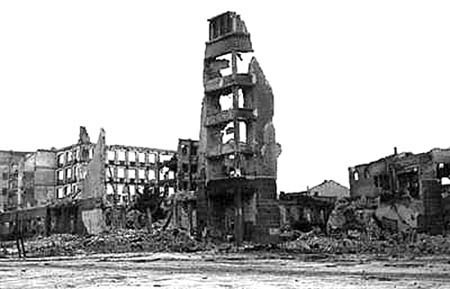
Ruins in Stalingrad, typical of the destruction in many Soviet cities

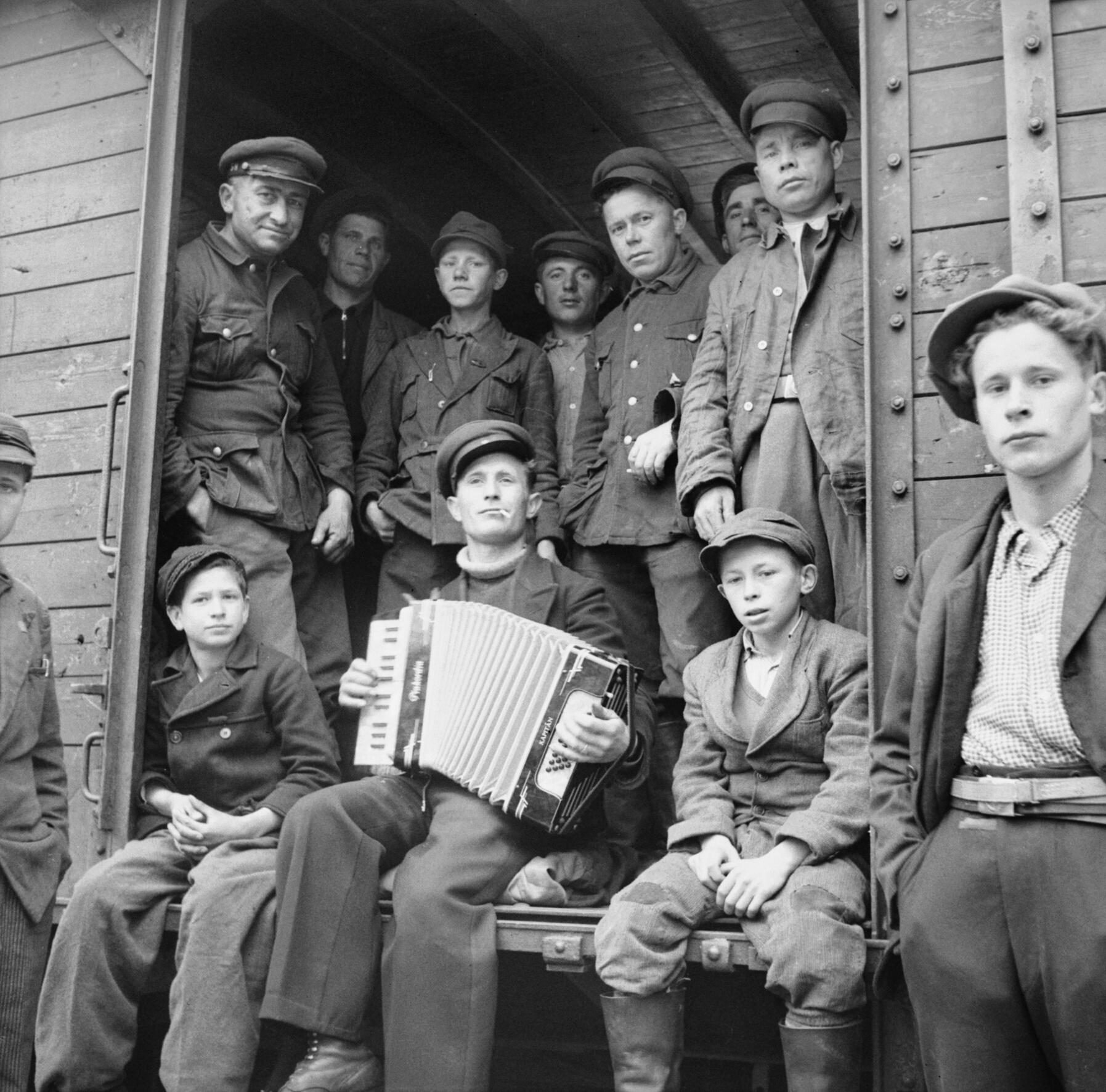
The departure of a train echelon carrying former prisoners of war and Ostarbeiters from a transit camp near Hamburg. May 31, 1945

The Soviet Union suffered enormous losses in the war against Germany. The Soviet population decreased by about 27 million during the war; of these, 8.7 million were combatant deaths. The 19 million non-combatant deaths had a variety of causes: starvation in the siege of Leningrad; conditions in German prisons and concentration camps; mass shootings of civilians; harsh labour in German industry; famine and disease; conditions in Soviet camps; and service in German or German-controlled military units fighting the Soviet Union.

Allied forces initiated a mandatory repatriation of Soviet citizens following the Yalta Conference. These included 4.2 million Soviet prisoners of war, Ostarbeiters, and collaborators. While roughly 80 percent returned voluntarily, Western Allies initially used force to transfer those who resisted. Notable operations included the British handover of collaborationist Cossack formations and Operation Keelhaul, which targeted remaining military collaborators.

Declassified archives disprove claims of universal, immediate persecution for the returnees. 58 percent of returnees were cleared and able to return home. Officials mobilized 33.5 percent, primarily former POWs, into the Red Army or construction battalions for forced labor, and transferred 6.5 percent to NKVD special camps. Rank-and-file military collaborators received six-year terms in special settlements, and the state prosecuted officers and civilian collaborators in positions of authority sentencing them to the Gulag. Returning civilians and former POWs faced extortion, heavy labor, and social stigma that forced many to hide their pasts.

The economy had been devastated. Roughly a quarter of the Soviet Union's capital resources were destroyed, and industrial and agricultural output in 1945 fell far short of pre-war levels. To help rebuild the country, the Soviet government obtained limited credits from Britain and Sweden; it refused assistance offered by the United States under the Marshall Plan. Instead, the Soviet Union coerced Soviet-occupied Central and Eastern Europe to supply machinery and raw materials. Germany and former Nazi satellites made reparations to the Soviet Union. The reconstruction programme emphasized heavy industry to the detriment of agriculture and consumer goods. By 1953, steel production was twice its 1940 level, but the production of many consumer goods and foodstuffs was lower than it had been in the late 1920s.

World War II casualties

The immediate post-war period in Europe was dominated by the Soviet Union annexing, or converting into Soviet Socialist Republics, all the countries invaded and annexed by the Red Army driving the Germans out of central and eastern Europe. New satellite states were set up by the Soviets in Poland, Bulgaria, Hungary, Czechoslovakia, Romania, Albania, and East Germany; the last of these was created from the Soviet zone of occupation in Germany. Yugoslavia emerged as an independent Communist state allied but not aligned with the Soviet Union, owing to the independent nature of the military victory of the Partisans of Josip Broz Tito during World War II in Yugoslavia. The Allies established the Far Eastern Commission and Allied Council for Japan to administer their occupation of that country while the establishment Allied Control Council, administered occupied Germany. Following the Potsdam Conference agreements, the Soviet Union occupied and subsequently annexed the strategic island of Sakhalin.

=== Germany ===
Post-WWII occupation zones of Germany, in its 1937 borders, with territories east of the Oder–Neisse line shown as annexed by Poland and the Soviet Union, plus the Saar protectorate and divided Berlin. East Germany was formed by the Soviet Zone, while West Germany was formed by the American, British, and French zones in 1949 and the Saar in 1957.

In the east, the Sudetenland reverted to Czechoslovakia following the European Advisory Commission's decision to delimit German territory to be the territory it held on 31 December 1937. Close to one-quarter of pre-war (1937) Nazi Germany was de facto annexed by the Allies; roughly 10 million Germans were either expelled from this territory or not permitted to return to it if they had fled during the war. The remainder of Germany was partitioned into four zones of occupation, coordinated by the Allied Control Council. The Saar was detached and put into economic union with France in 1947. In 1949, the Federal Republic of Germany was created out of the Western zones. The Soviet zone became the German Democratic Republic.

Germany paid reparations to the United Kingdom, France, and the Soviet Union, mainly in the form of dismantled factories, forced labour, and coal. The German standard of living was to be reduced to its 1932 level. Beginning immediately after the German surrender and continuing for the next two years, the U.S. and Britain pursued an "intellectual reparations" programme to harvest all technological and scientific know-how as well as all patents in Germany. The value of these amounted to around $10 billion (US$130 billion in 2025 dollars). In accordance with the Paris Peace Treaties, 1947, reparations were also assessed from the countries of Italy, Romania, Hungary, Bulgaria, and Finland.

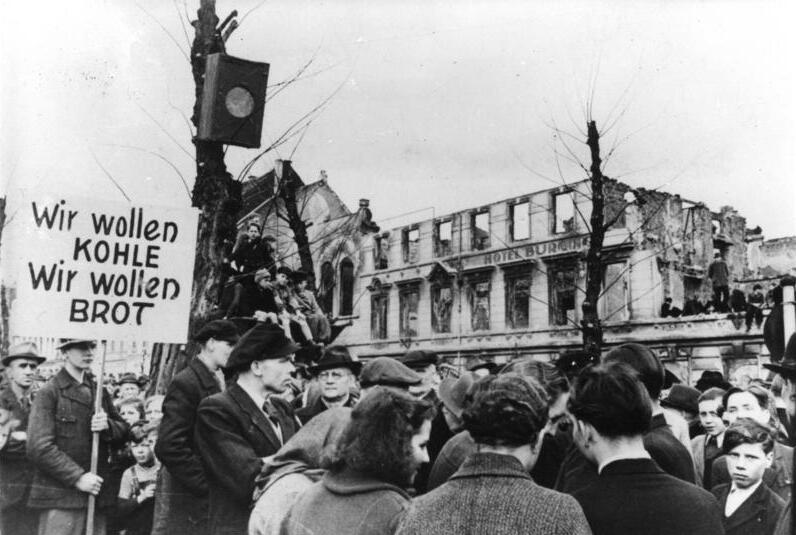
The hunger-winter of 1947. Thousands protest against the disastrous food situation. The sign says "We want coal. We want bread." (31 March 1947).

US policy in post-war Germany from April 1945 until July 1947 had been that no help should be given to the Germans in rebuilding their nation, save for the minimum required to mitigate starvation. The Allies' immediate post-war "industrial disarmament" plan for Germany had been to destroy Germany's capability to wage war by complete or partial de-industrialization. The first industrial plan for Germany signed in 1946, required the destruction of 1,500 manufacturing plants to lower German heavy industry output to roughly 50% of its 1938 level. The dismantling of the West German industry ended in 1951. By 1950, equipment had been removed from 706 manufacturing plants, and steel production capacity had been reduced by 6.7 million tons.

After lobbying by the U.S. Joint Chiefs of Staff and Generals Lucius D. Clay and George C. Marshall, the Truman administration accepted that economic recovery in Europe could not go forward without the reconstruction of the German industrial base on which it had previously been dependent. In July 1947, President Truman rescinded on "national security grounds" the directive that had ordered the U.S. occupation forces to "take no steps looking toward the economic rehabilitation of Germany." A new directive recognized that "[a]n orderly, prosperous Europe requires the economic contributions of a stable and productive Germany." From mid-1946 onwards Germany received U.S. government aid through the GARIOA programme. From 1948 onward West Germany also became a minor beneficiary of the Marshall Plan. Volunteer organizations had initially been forbidden to send food, but in early 1946 the Council of Relief Agencies Licensed to Operate in Germany was founded. The prohibition against sending CARE Packages to individuals in Germany was rescinded on 5 June 1946.

Following the German surrender, the International Committee of the Red Cross (ICRC) was prohibited from providing aid such as food or visiting POW camps for Germans inside Germany. However, after making approaches to the Allies in the autumn of 1945 it was allowed to investigate the camps in the United Kingdom and French occupation zones of Germany, as well as to provide relief to the prisoners held there. On 4 February 1946, the ICRC was also permitted to visit and assist prisoners in the U.S. occupation zone of Germany, although only with very small quantities of food. The ICRC petitioned successfully for improvements to be made in the living conditions of German POWs.

The German people as a whole, especially its youth, were traumatized psychologically by the previous decade of Nazi rule, with major cities and infrastructure destroyed by Allied bombardments. This trauma was multifaceted, as it permeated all levels of society, by means of the systematic Nazification of the country with the strategic creation of the Reich Ministry of Public Enlightenment and Propaganda which took over the media and all institutions, and put in place the systematic indoctrination of the very young via the creation of the Hitler Youth, the Deutsches Jungvolk, the League of German Girls and the Jungmädelbund. At the end of the war, major cities were devastated, food shortages ensued, and a wave of denazification occurred throughout occupied Germany.

=== France ===
As France was liberated from German occupation, an épuration (purge) of real and suspected Nazi collaborators began. At first, this was undertaken in an extralegal manner by the French Resistance (called the épuration sauvage, "wild purge"). French women who had had romantic liaisons with German soldiers were publicly humiliated and had their heads shaved. There was also a wave of summary executions estimated to have killed about 10,000 people.

When the Provisional Government of the French Republic established control, the Épuration légale ("legal purge") began. There were no international war crimes trials for French collaborators, who were tried in the domestic courts. Approximately 300,000 cases were investigated; 120,000 people were given various sentences including 6,763 death sentences (of which only 791 were carried out). Most convicts were given amnesty a few years later.

=== Italy ===
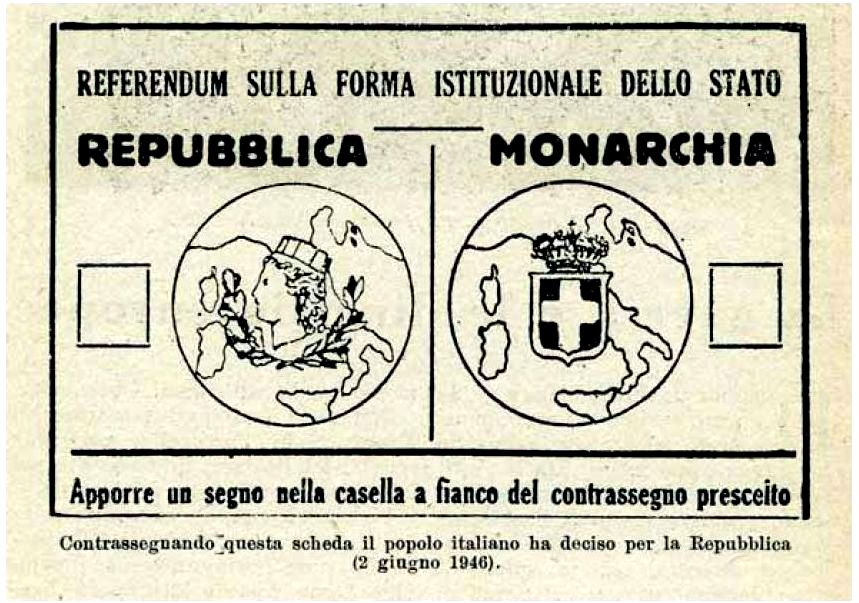
Electoral ballot of the 1946 Italian institutional referendum

The aftermath of World War II left Italy with an anger against the monarchy for its endorsement of the Fascist regime for the previous twenty years. These frustrations contributed to a revival of the Italian republican movement. In the 1946 Italian constitutional referendum, held on 2 June, a day celebrated since as Festa della Repubblica, the Italian monarchy was abolished, having been associated with the deprivations of the war and the Fascist rule, especially in the North, and Italy became a republic. This was the first time that Italian women voted at the national level, and the second time overall considering the local elections that were held a few months earlier in some cities.

King Victor Emmanuel III's son, King Umberto II, was forced to abdicate and exiled. The Republican Constitution was approved on 1 January 1948, resulting from the work of a Constituent Assembly formed by the representatives of all the anti-fascist forces that contributed to the defeat of Nazi and Fascist forces during the liberation of Italy. Unlike in Germany and Japan, no war crimes tribunals were held against Italian military and political leaders, though the Italian resistance summarily executed some of them (such as Mussolini) at the end of the war; the Togliatti amnesty, taking its name from the Communist Party secretary at the time, pardoned all wartime common and political crimes in 1946.

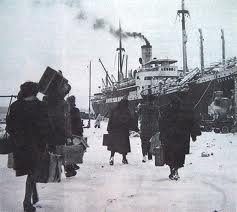
Istrian Italians leave Pola in 1947 during the Istrian-Dalmatian exodus

The 1947 Treaty of Peace with Italy spelled the end of the Italian colonial empire, along with other border revisions, like the transfer of the Italian Islands of the Aegean to the Kingdom of Greece and the transfer to France of Briga and Tenda, as well than to minor revisions of the Franco-Italian border. Moreover, under the Treaty of Peace with Italy, Istria, Kvarner, most of the Julian March as well as the Dalmatian city of Zara was annexed by Yugoslavia, causing the Istrian–Dalmatian exodus which led to the emigration of between 230,000 and 350,000 of local ethnic Italians (Istrian Italians and Dalmatian Italians)—the others being ethnic Slovenians, ethnic Croatians and ethnic Istro-Romanians choosing to maintain Italian citizenship—towards Italy, and in smaller numbers, towards the Americas, Australia and South Africa.

The 1947 Treaty of Peace compelled Italy to pay $360 million (US dollars at 1938 prices) in war reparations: $125 million to Yugoslavia, $105 million to Greece, $100 million to the Soviet Union, $25 million to Ethiopia, and $5 million to Albania. In 1954 the Free Territory of Trieste, an independent territory between northern Italy and Yugoslavia under direct responsibility of the UN Security Council, was divided between the two states, Italy and Yugoslavia. The Italian border that applies today has existed since 1975, when Trieste was formally re-annexed to Italy after the Treaty of Osimo. In 1950 Italian Somaliland was made a United Nations Trust Territory under Italian administration until 1 July 1960.

=== Austria ===
The Federal State of Austria had been annexed by Germany in 1938 (Anschluss; this union had been banned by the 1919 Treaty of Versailles). Austria (first called Ostmark, later "Alpine and Danube" by the Germans) was made independent from Germany and divided into four zones of occupation. With the Austrian State Treaty, these zones reunited in 1955 to become the Republic of Austria.

=== Japan ===
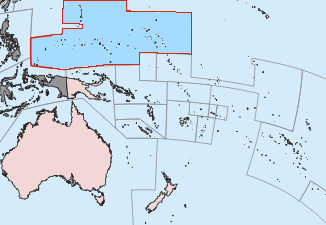
The Trust Territory of the Pacific Islands in Micronesia administered by the United States from 1947 to 1986

Following the war, the Allies rescinded the Empire of Japan's pre-war annexations such as Manchuria, and Korea became militarily occupied by the United States in the south and by the Soviet Union in the north. The Philippines and Guam were returned to the United States. Burma, Malaya, and Singapore were returned to Britain and Indochina back to France. The Dutch East Indies was to be handed back to the Dutch but was resisted leading to the Indonesian war for independence. At the Yalta Conference, U.S. President Franklin D. Roosevelt had secretly traded the Japanese Kurils and south Sakhalin to the Soviet Union in return for Soviet entry into the war with Japan. The Soviet Union annexed the Kuril Islands, provoking the Kuril Islands dispute, which is ongoing, as Russia continues to occupy the islands.

Hundreds of thousands of Japanese were forced to relocate to the Japanese main islands. Okinawa became a main U.S. staging point. The U.S. covered large areas of it with military bases and continued to occupy it until 1972, years after the end of the occupation of the main islands. The bases remain. To skirt the Geneva Convention, the Allies classified many Japanese soldiers as Japanese Surrendered Personnel (JSP) instead of POWs and used them as forced labour until 1947. The United Kingdom, France, and the Netherlands used JSP to support their military operations in the region after World War II. General Douglas MacArthur established the International Military Tribunal for the Far East. The Allies collected reparations from Japan.

Silent film footage taken in Hiroshima in March 1946 showing survivors with severe burns and keloid scars.

To further remove Japan as a potential future military threat, the Far Eastern Commission decided to de-industrialize Japan, to reduce the Japanese standard of living to what prevailed between 1930 and 1934. In the end, the de-industrialisation programme in Japan was implemented to a lesser degree than the one in Germany. Japan received emergency aid from GARIOA, as did Germany. In early 1946, the Licensed Agencies for Relief in Asia were formed and permitted to supply Japanese with food and clothes. In April 1948 the Johnston Committee Report recommended that the economy of Japan should be reconstructed due to the high cost to US taxpayers of continuous emergency aid.

Survivors of the atomic bombings of Hiroshima and Nagasaki, known as hibakusha (被爆者), were ostracized by Japanese society. Japan provided no special assistance to these people until 1952. By the 65th anniversary of the bombings, total casualties from the initial attack and later deaths reached about 270,000 in Hiroshima and 150,000 in Nagasaki. About 230,000 hibakusha were still alive as of 2010, and about 2,200 were suffering from radiation-caused illnesses as of 2007.

=== Finland ===
In the Winter War of 1939–1940, the Soviet Union invaded neutral Finland and annexed some of its territory. From 1941 until 1944, Finland aligned itself with Nazi Germany in a failed effort to regain lost territories from the Soviets. Finland retained its independence following the war but remained subject to Soviet-imposed constraints in its domestic affairs.

=== The Baltic states ===
In 1940 the Soviet Union invaded and annexed the neutral Baltic states, Estonia, Latvia and Lithuania. In June 1941, the Soviet governments of the Baltic states carried out mass deportations of "enemies of the people"; as a result, many treated the invading Nazis as liberators when they invaded only a week later. The Atlantic Charter promised self-determination to people deprived of it during the war. The British Prime Minister, Winston Churchill, argued for a weaker interpretation of the Charter to permit the Soviet Union to continue to control the Baltic states. In March 1944 the US accepted Churchill's view that the Atlantic Charter did not apply to the Baltic states. With the return of Soviet troops at the end of the war, the Forest Brothers mounted a guerrilla war. This continued until the mid-1950s.

=== The Philippines ===
An estimated 1 million military and civilian Filipinos were killed from all causes; of these 131,028 were listed as killed in 72 war crime events. According to a United States analysis released years after the war, U.S. casualties were 10,380 dead and 36,550 wounded; Japanese dead were 255,795.

== Population displacement ==
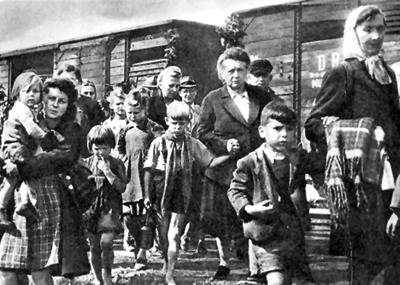
Expulsion of Germans from the Sudetenland

As a result of the new borders drawn by the victorious nations, large populations suddenly found themselves in hostile territory. The Soviet Union took over areas formerly controlled by Germany, Finland, Poland and Japan. Poland lost the Kresy region (about half of its pre-war territory) and received most of Germany east of the Oder–Neisse line, including the industrial regions of Silesia. The German state of the Saar was temporarily a protectorate of France but later returned to German administration. As set forth at Potsdam, approximately 12 million people were expelled from Germany, including 7 million from Germany proper, and three million from the Sudetenland.

During the war, the United States government interned approximately 110,000 Japanese Americans and Japanese who lived along the Pacific coast of the United States in the wake of Imperial Japan's attack on Pearl Harbor. Canada interned approximately 22,000 Japanese Canadians, 14,000 of whom were born in Canada. After the war, some internees chose to return to Japan, while most remained in North America.

=== Poland ===
The Soviet Union expelled at least 2 million Poles from the east of the new border approximating the Curzon Line. This estimate is uncertain as neither the Polish Communist government nor the Soviet government kept track of the number of expelled people. The number of Polish citizens inhabiting Polish borderlands (Kresy region) was about 13 million before World War II broke out according to official Polish statistics. Polish citizens killed in the war that originated from the Polish borderlands territory (killed by either the German Nazi regime or the Soviet regime, or expelled to distant parts of Siberia) were accounted as Russian, Ukrainian, or Belarusian casualties of war in official Soviet historiography. This fact imposes additional difficulties in making the correct estimation of the number of Polish citizens forcibly transferred after the war. The border change also reversed the results of the 1919–1920 Polish–Soviet War. Former Polish cities such as Lwów came under the control of the Ukrainian Soviet Socialist Republic. Additionally, the Soviet Union transferred more than two million people within their borders; these included Germans, Finns, Crimean Tatars and Chechens.

== Rape during occupation and liberation ==
=== In Europe ===
As Soviet troops marched across the Balkans, they committed rapes and robberies in Romania, Hungary, Czechoslovakia, and Yugoslavia. The population of Bulgaria was largely spared of this treatment, possibly due to a sense of ethnic kinship or to the leadership of Marshal Fyodor Tolbukhin. The population of Germany was treated significantly worse. Rape and murder of German civilians was as bad as, and sometimes worse than, Nazi propaganda had anticipated. Political officers encouraged Soviet troops to seek revenge and terrorise the German population. On "the basis of Hochrechnungen (projections or estimations), [...] 1.9 million German women altogether were raped at the end of the war by Red Army soldiers." About one-third of all German women in Berlin were raped by Soviet forces, and a substantial minority were raped multiple times. In Berlin, contemporary hospital records indicate between 95,000 and 130,000 women were raped by Soviet troops. About 10,000 of these women died, mostly by suicide. Over 4.5 million Germans fled towards the West. The Soviets initially had no rules against their troops "fraternising" with German women, but by 1947 they started to isolate their troops from the German population in an attempt to stop rape and robbery by the troops. Not all Soviet soldiers participated in these activities.

Foreign reports of Soviet brutality were denounced as false. Rape, robbery, and murder were blamed on German bandits impersonating Soviet soldiers. Some justified Soviet brutality towards German civilians based on previous brutality of German troops toward Russian civilians. Until the reunification of Germany, East German histories virtually ignored the actions of Soviet troops, and Russian histories still tend to do so. Reports of mass rapes by Soviet troops were often dismissed as anti-Communist propaganda or the normal byproduct of war.

Rapes also occurred under other Allied forces in Europe, though the majority were committed by Soviet troops. In a letter to the editor of Time published in September 1945, a U.S. Army sergeant wrote, "Our own Army and the British Army along with ours have done their share of looting and raping....This offensive attitude among our troops is not at all general, but the percentage is large enough to have given our Army a pretty black name, and we too are considered an army of rapists." Robert Lilly's analysis of military records led him to conclude about 14,000 rapes occurred in Britain, France, and Germany at the hands of U.S. soldiers between 1942 and 1945. Lilly assumed that only 5% of rapes by American soldiers were reported, making 17,000 GI rapes a possibility, while analysts estimate that 50% of (ordinary peacetime) rapes are reported. Supporting Lilly's lower figure is the "crucial difference" that for World War II military rapes "it was the commanding officer, not the victim, who brought charges." According to German historian Miriam Gebhardt, as many as 190,000 women were raped by U.S. soldiers in Germany.

German soldiers left many war children behind in nations such as France and Denmark, which were occupied for an extended period. After the war, the children and their mothers often suffered recriminations. In Norway, the "Tyskerunger" (German-kids) suffered greatly.

During the Italian campaign, the Goumiers, French Moroccan colonial troops attached to the French Expeditionary Forces, have been accused of committing rape and murder against the Italian peasant communities, mostly targeting civilian women and girls, as well as a few men and boys. In Italy the victims of these acts were described as Marocchinate meaning literally "Moroccaned" (or people who have been subjected to acts committed by Moroccans). According to Italian victims associations, a total of more than 7,000 civilians, including children, were raped by Goumiers.

=== In Japan ===
In the first few weeks of the American military occupation of Japan, rape and other violent crime was widespread in naval ports like Yokohama and Yokosuka but declined shortly afterward. There were 1,336 reported rapes during the first 10 days of the occupation of Kanagawa prefecture. Historian Toshiyuki Tanaka relates that in Yokohama, the capital of the prefecture, there were 119 known rapes in September 1945.

Historians Eiji Takemae and Robert Ricketts state that, "When U.S. paratroopers landed in Sapporo, an orgy of looting, sexual violence, and drunken brawling ensued. Gang rapes and other sex atrocities were not infrequent" and some of the rape victims committed suicide.

General Robert L. Eichelberger, the commander of the U.S. Eighth Army, recorded that in the one instance when the Japanese formed a self-help vigilante guard to protect women from off-duty GIs, the Eighth Army ordered armored vehicles in the battle array into the streets and arrested the leaders, and the leaders received long prison terms.

According to Takemae and Ricketts, members of the British Commonwealth Occupation Force (BCOF) were also involved in rapes:

A former prostitute recalled that as soon as Australian troops arrived in Kure in early 1946, they "dragged young women into their jeeps, took them to the mountain, and then raped them. I heard them screaming for help nearly every night". Such behavior was commonplace, but news of criminal activity by Occupation forces was quickly suppressed.

Rape committed by U.S. soldiers occupying Okinawa was also a notable phenomenon. Okinawan historian Oshiro Masayasu (former director of the Okinawa Prefectural Historical Archives) writes:

Soon after the U.S. marines landed, all the women of a village on Motobu Peninsula fell into the hands of American soldiers. At the time, there were only women, children and old people in the village, as all the young men had been mobilized for the war. Soon after landing, the marines "mopped up" the entire village, but found no signs of Japanese forces. Taking advantage of the situation, they started "hunting for women" in broad daylight and those who were hiding in the village or nearby air raid shelters were dragged out one after another.

According to Toshiyuki Tanaka, 76 cases of rape or rape-murder were reported during the first five years of the American occupation of Okinawa. However, he claims this is probably not the true figure, as most cases were unreported.

==== Comfort women for Japanese soldiers ====
During World War II, the Japanese military established brothels filled with "comfort women," a euphemism for the 200,000 girls and women who were forced into sexual slavery for Japanese soldiers. In Confucian nations like Korea and China, where premarital sex is considered shameful, the subject of the "comfort women" was ignored for decades after 1945 as the victims were considered pariahs. Dutch comfort women brought a successful case before the Batavia Military Tribunal in 1948.

== Post-war tensions ==
=== Europe ===
Soviet expansion, change of Central-Eastern European borders and creation of the Communist Eastern Bloc after World War II

The alliance between the Western Allies and the Soviet Union began to deteriorate even before the war was over, when Stalin, Roosevelt, and Churchill exchanged a heated correspondence over whether the Polish government-in-exile, backed by Roosevelt and Churchill, or the Provisional Government, backed by Stalin, should be recognised. Stalin won.

Many allied leaders felt that war between the United States and the Soviet Union was likely. On 19 May 1945, the United States Under-Secretary of State Joseph Grew went so far as to say that it was inevitable.

On 5 March 1946, in his "Sinews of Peace" (Iron Curtain) speech at Westminster College in Fulton, Missouri, Winston Churchill said "a shadow" had fallen over Europe. He described Stalin as having dropped an "Iron Curtain" between East and West. Stalin responded by charging that co-existence between communist countries and the West was impossible. In mid-1948 the Soviet Union imposed a blockade on the Western zone of occupation in Berlin.

Due to the rising tension in Europe and concerns over further Soviet expansion, American planners came up with a contingency plan code-named Operation Dropshot in 1949. It considered possible nuclear and conventional war with the Soviet Union and its allies to counter a Soviet takeover of Western Europe, the Near East, and parts of Eastern Asia that they anticipated would begin around 1957. In response, the United States. would saturate the Soviet Union with atomic and high-explosive bombs, and then invade and occupy the country. In later years, to reduce military expenditures while countering Soviet conventional strength, American President Dwight Eisenhower would adopt a strategy of massive retaliation, relying on the threat of a U.S. nuclear strike to prevent non-nuclear incursions by the Soviet Union in Europe and elsewhere. The approach entailed a major buildup of U.S. nuclear forces and a corresponding reduction in America's non-nuclear ground and naval strength. The Soviet Union viewed these developments as "atomic blackmail."

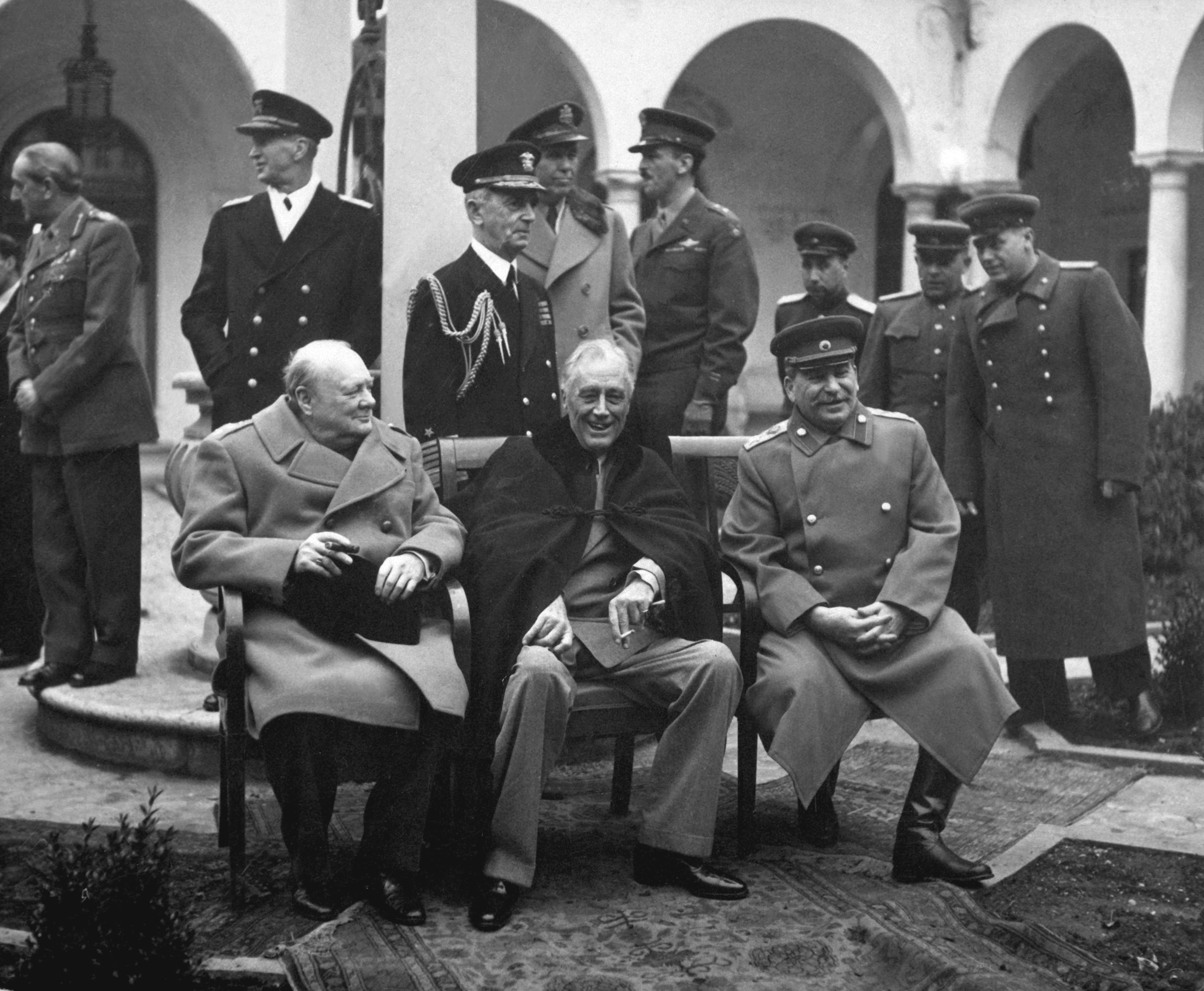
The "Big Three" at the Yalta Conference: Winston Churchill, Franklin D. Roosevelt and Joseph Stalin. Diplomatic relations between their three countries changed radically in the aftermath of World War II.

In Greece, civil war broke out in 1946 between Anglo-American-supported royalist forces and communist-led forces, with the royalist forces emerging as the victors. The U.S. launched a massive programme of military and economic aid to Greece and to neighbouring Turkey, arising from a fear that the Soviet Union stood on the verge of breaking through the NATO defence line to the oil-rich Middle East. On 12 March 1947, to gain Congressional support for the aid, President Truman described the aid as promoting democracy in defence of the "Free World," a principle that became known as the Truman Doctrine.

The United States sought to promote an economically strong and politically united Western Europe to counter the threat posed by the Soviet Union. This was done openly using tools such as the European Recovery Program, which encouraged European economic integration. The International Authority for the Ruhr, designed to keep German industry down and controlled, evolved into the European Coal and Steel Community (ECOSOC), a founding pillar of the European Union. The United States also worked covertly to promote European integration, for example using the American Committee on United Europe to funnel funds to European federalist movements. To ensure that Western Europe could withstand the Soviet military threat, the Western European Union was founded in 1948 and NATO in 1949. The first NATO Secretary General, Lord Ismay, famously stated the organisation's goal was, "to keep the Russians out, the Americans in, and the Germans down." However without the manpower and industrial output of West Germany, no conventional defence of Western Europe had any hope of succeeding. To remedy this, in 1950 the United States sought to promote the European Defence Community, which would have included a rearmed West Germany. The attempt was dashed when the French Parliament rejected it. On 9 May 1955, West Germany was instead admitted to NATO; the immediate result was the creation of the Warsaw Pact five days later.

The Cold War also saw the creation of propaganda and espionage organisations such as Radio Free Europe, the Information Research Department, Gehlen Organization, Central Intelligence Agency, Special Activities Division, and the Ministry for State Security, as well as the radicalization and proliferation of numerous far-left and far-right terrorist organizations in Western European countries (Italy, France, West Germany, Belgium, Francoist Spain, and Netherlands), with spillovers in Northern and Southeastern Europe.

=== Asia ===
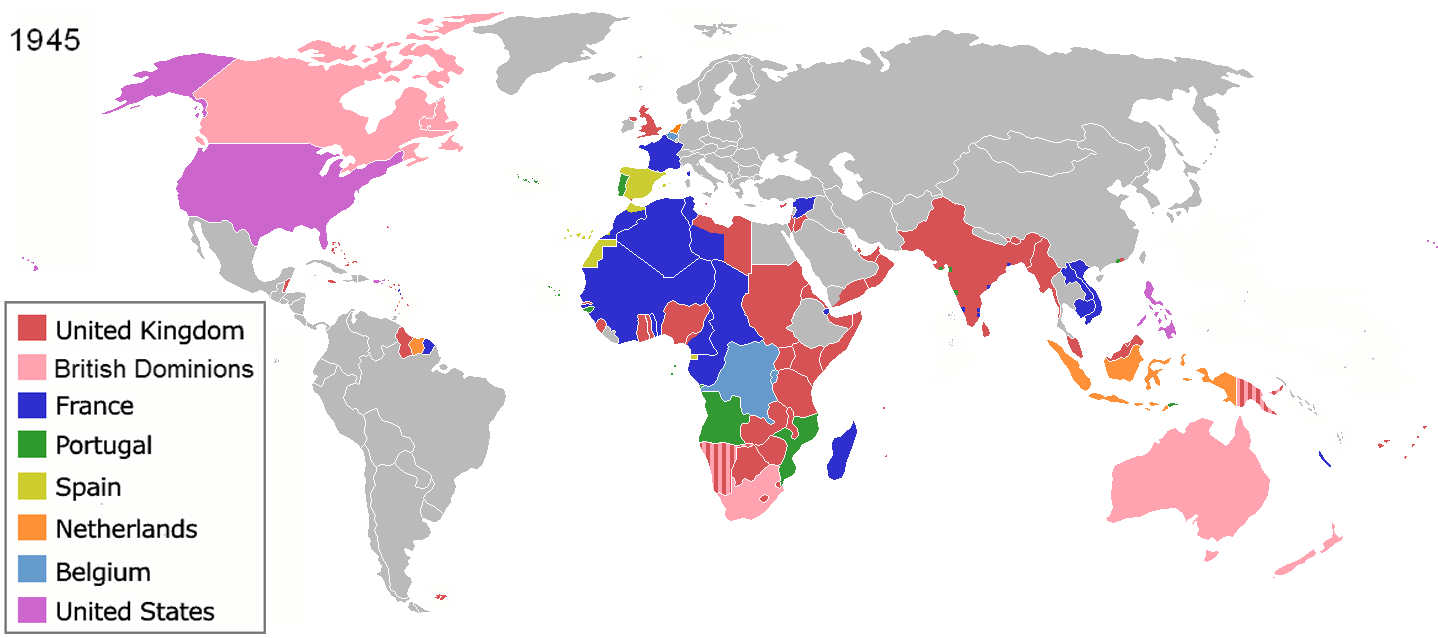
World map of colonization at the end of the Second World War in 1945

In Asia, the surrender of Japanese forces was complicated by the split between East and West as well as by the movement toward national self-determination in European colonial territories.

==== India ====
Decisions to decolonize British India led to an agreement to partition the country along religious lines into two independent dominions: India and Pakistan. The partition resulted in communal violence and massive displacements of the population. It is often described as the largest mass human migration and one of the largest refugee crises in history.

==== China ====
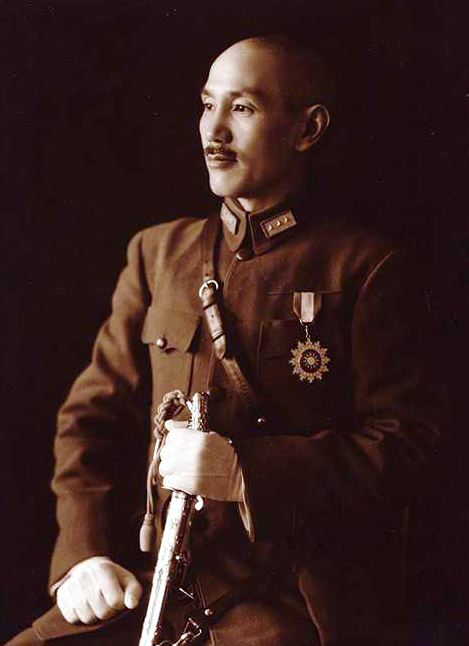
Generalissimo Chiang Kai-shek, leader of the Chinese nationalist Kuomintang

As agreed to at the Yalta Conference, the Soviet Union declared war on Japan. Soviet forces invaded Manchuria which led to the collapse of the Manchukuo and expulsion of all Japanese settlers from the puppet state. The Soviet Union dismantled the industrial base in Manchuria that the Japanese had built up and it subsequently became a base for the Communist Chinese forces due to the area being under Soviet occupation.

Following the end of the war, the Kuomintang (KMT) party (led by generalissimo Chiang Kai-shek) and the Communist Chinese forces resumed fighting each other, which they had temporarily suspended in order to fight Japan. The fight against the Japanese occupiers had strengthened popular support among the Chinese people for the Communist forces while it weakened the KMT, which depleted its strength fighting them. Full-scale war between the KMT and CCF broke out in June 1946. Despite United States' support for the Kuomintang, Communist forces ultimately prevailed and they established the People's Republic of China (PRC) on the mainland. The KMT forces retreated to the island of Taiwan in 1949 where they established the Republic of China (ROC).

With the Communist victory in the civil war, the Soviet Union gave up its claim to military bases in China that were given to it by its Western Allies at the end of World War II.

While large scale hostilities largely ceased by 1950, intermittent clashes occurred between the two from 1950 to 1979. Taiwan unilaterally declared the civil war over in 1991, but no formal peace treaty or truce has been signed and the PRC continues to officially see Taiwan as a breakaway province that rightfully belongs to it.

The outbreak of the Korean War a few months after the conclusion of the Chinese Civil War and continued U.S. support for the KMT were the main reasons that prevented the PRC from invading Taiwan.

==== Korea ====
Evolution of the border between the two Koreas, from the Yalta Soviet-American 38th parallel division to the stalemate of 1953 that was officially ended in 2018 by North Korean Kim Jong-Un and South Korean Moon Jae-In

At the Yalta Conference, the Allies agreed that an undivided post-war Korea would be placed under 4-power multinational trusteeship. After Japan's surrender, this agreement was modified to a joint Soviet-American occupation of Korea. The agreement was that Korea would be divided and occupied by the Soviets from the north and the Americans from the south.

Korea, formerly under Japanese rule, and which had been partially occupied by the Red Army following the Soviet Union's entry into the war against Japan, was divided at the 38th parallel on the orders of the U.S. Department of War. A United States military government in southern Korea was established in the capital city of Seoul. The US military commander, Lieutenant General John R. Hodge, enlisted many former Japanese administrative officials to serve in this government. North of the military line, the Soviets administered the disarming and demobilisation of repatriated Korean nationalist guerrillas who had fought on the side of Chinese nationalists against the Japanese in Manchuria during World War II. Simultaneously, the Soviets enabled a build-up of heavy armaments to pro-communist forces in the north. The military line became a political line in 1948, when separate republics emerged on both sides of the 38th parallel, each republic claiming to be the legitimate government of Korea. It culminated in the north invading the south, start of the Korean War two years later.

==== Malaya ====
Labour and civil unrest broke out in the British colony of Malaya in 1946. A state of emergency was declared by the colonial authorities in 1948 with the outbreak of acts of terrorism. The situation deteriorated into a full-scale anti-colonial insurgency, or Anti-British National Liberation War as the insurgents referred to it, led by the Malayan National Liberation Army (MNLA), the military wing of the Malayan Communist Party. The Malayan Emergency would endure for the next twelve years, ending in 1960. In 1967, communist leader Chin Peng reopened hostilities, culminating in a second emergency that lasted until 1989.

==== French Indochina ====
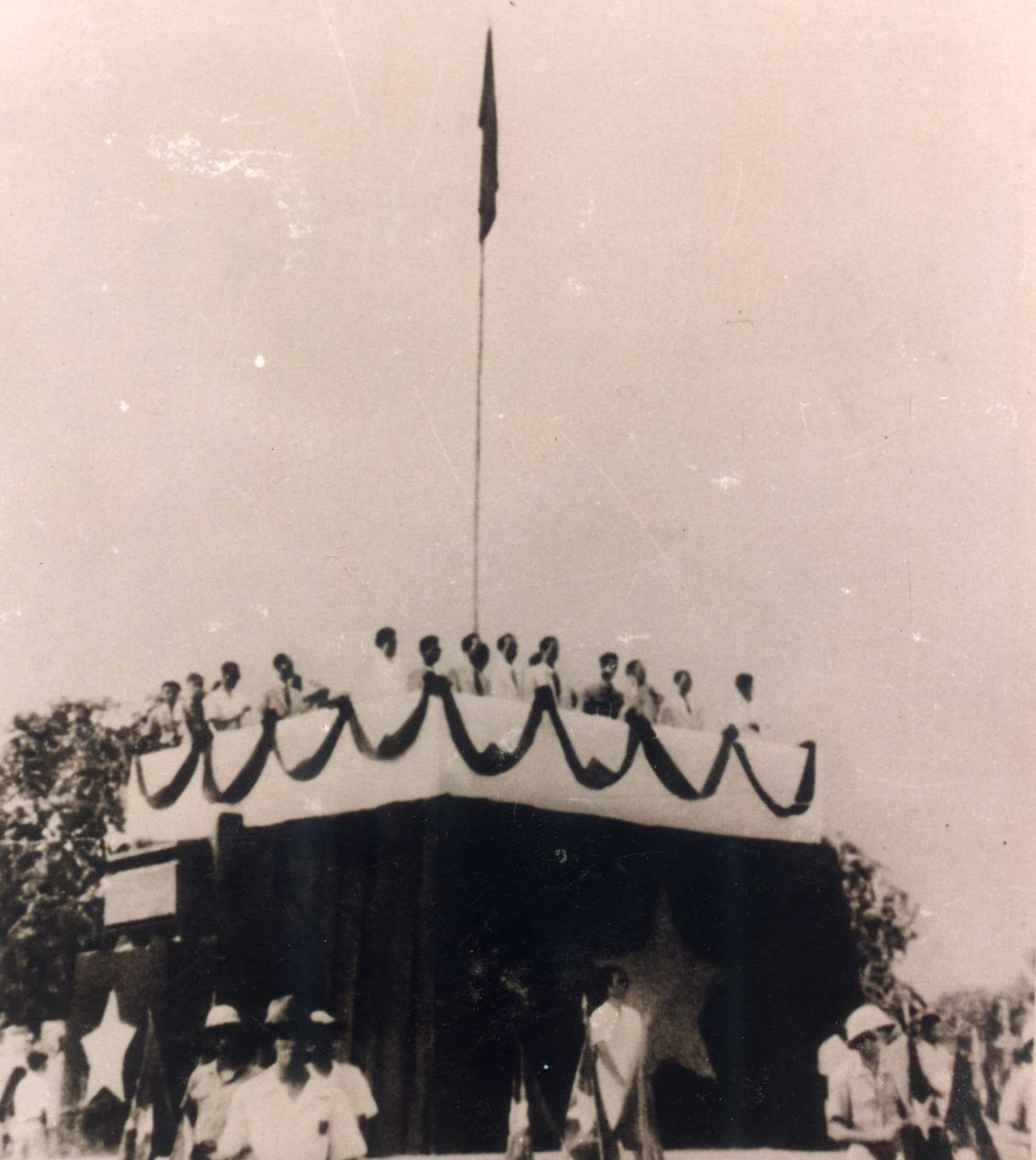
Ho Chi Minh declaring the independence of the Democratic Republic of Vietnam at the Ba Dinh Square on September 2, 1945

Events after World War II in French Indochina, which consisted of the territories of modern-day Vietnam, Laos and Cambodia, set the stage for Indochina wars.

By 1941 during World War II, Japan gained full military access across Indochina and established a fragile dual colonial rule that maintained French administration while facilitating Japanese preparations for Southeast Asian operations. The communist-controlled Viet Minh Front was formed in 1941 to fight against both Japanese and French forces. Because the French colonial authorities began holding secret talks with Free France, the Japanese carried out a coup d’état on 9 March 1945. When Japan surrendered in August, this created a power vacuum, and the Viet Minh seized power during the August Revolution, declaring the independence of the Democratic Republic of Vietnam. However, the Allies (including the Soviet Union) all agreed that the area belonged to the French.

From 1945 onward, the Vietnamese were locked in civil conflicts over the destiny of their post-colonial state after the ousting of the French and the surrender of Japan. Meanwhile, Nationalist Chinese forces moved in from the north and British from the south (as the French were unable to do so immediately themselves) and then handed power to the French, a process completed by March 1946. Attempts to integrate the Democratic Republic of Vietnam with French rule failed and the Viet Minh launched their rebellion against the French rule starting the First Indochina War that same year (the Viet Minh organized common fronts to fight the French in Laos and Cambodia).

The war ended in 1954 with the French withdrawal and the partition of Vietnam, which was intended to be temporary until elections could be held. The Democratic Republic of Vietnam controlled the North, while the State of Vietnam held the South. Ngo Dinh Diem, backed by the United States in his refusal to hold elections, which he claimed would be unfair due to communist rigging, established the Republic of Vietnam. Communist insurgents in the South formed the NLF under the direct guidance of North Vietnam to fight against the South Vietnamese government, a conflict that ultimately ended with North Vietnam conquering the South in April 1975.

==== Dutch East Indies (Indonesia) ====
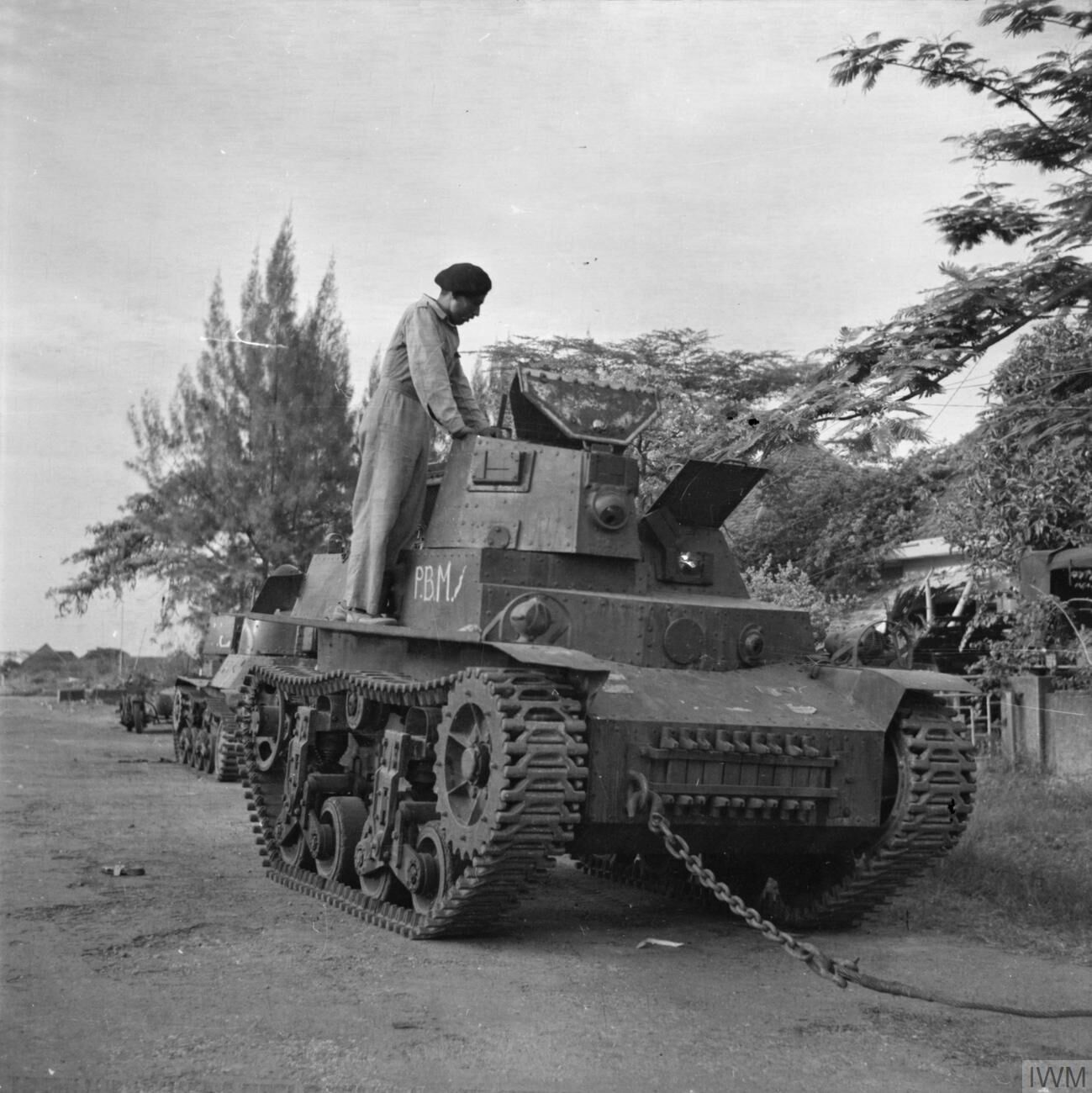
A soldier of an Indian armoured regiment examines a light tank used by Indonesian nationalists and captured by British forces during the fighting in Surabaya.

Japan invaded and occupied the Dutch East Indies during the war and replaced the colonial government with a new administration. Although the top positions were held by Japanese officers, the internment of all Dutch citizens meant that Indonesians filled many leadership and administrative positions. Following the Japanese surrender in August 1945, Indonesian nationalist leaders such as Sukarno and Mohammad Hatta declared Indonesia as independent. A four-and-a-half-year struggle followed as the Dutch tried to re-establish their rule in colony, using a significant portion of their Marshall Plan aid to this end. The Dutch were aided by British forces for the first phase of the conflict until the United Kingdom withdrew. The British also initially used 35,000 Japanese Surrendered Personnel to support their military operations in Indonesia. Although Dutch forces re-occupied most of Indonesia, an Indonesian guerrilla campaign supported by the majority of Indonesians ensured, and ultimately international opinion favoured independence. In December 1949, the Netherlands formally recognised Indonesian sovereignty.

== Wartime criminals recruited as Cold War assets ==
=== Covert operations and espionage ===
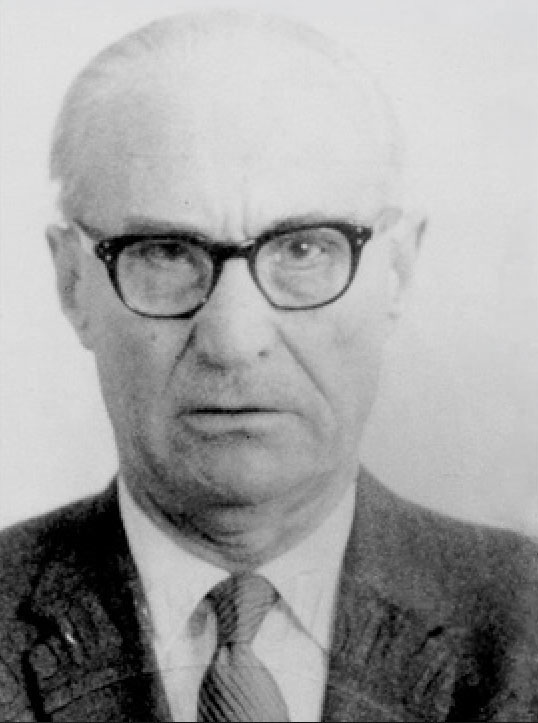
Aleksandras Lileikis, a Lithuanian collaborationist unit commander who oversaw the murder of 60,000 Jews in Lithuania, later worked for the CIA.

British covert operations in the Baltic States, which began in 1944 against the Nazis, escalated following the war. In Operation Jungle, the Secret Intelligence Service (known as MI6) recruited and trained Estonians, Latvians, and Lithuanians for the clandestine work in the Baltic states between 1948 and 1955. Leaders of the operation included Alfons Rebane, Stasys Žymantas, and Rūdolfs Silarājs. The agents were transported under the cover of the "British Baltic Fishery Protection Service." They launched from British-occupied Germany, using a converted World War II E-boat captained and crewed by former members of the wartime German navy. British intelligence also trained and infiltrated anti-communist agents into Soviet Union from across the Finnish border, with orders to assassinate Soviet officials. In the end, counter-intelligence supplied to the KGB by Kim Philby allowed the KGB to penetrate and ultimately gain control of MI6's entire intelligence network in the Baltic states.

Vietnam and the Middle East would later damage the reputation gained by the U.S. during its successes in Europe.

The KGB believed that the Third World rather than Europe was the arena in which it could win the Cold War. Moscow would in later years fuel an arms buildup in Africa. In later years, African countries used as proxies in the Cold War would often become "failed states" of their own.

In 2014, the New York Times reported that "In the decades after World War II, the Central Intelligence Agency (CIA) and other United States agencies employed at least a thousand Nazis as Cold War spies and informants and, as recently as the 1990s, concealed the government's ties to some still living in America, newly disclosed records and interviews show." According to Timothy Naftali, "The CIA's central concern [in recruiting former Nazi collaborators] was not so much the extent of the criminal's guilt as the likelihood that the agent's criminal past could remain a secret."

=== Recruitment of former enemy scientists ===
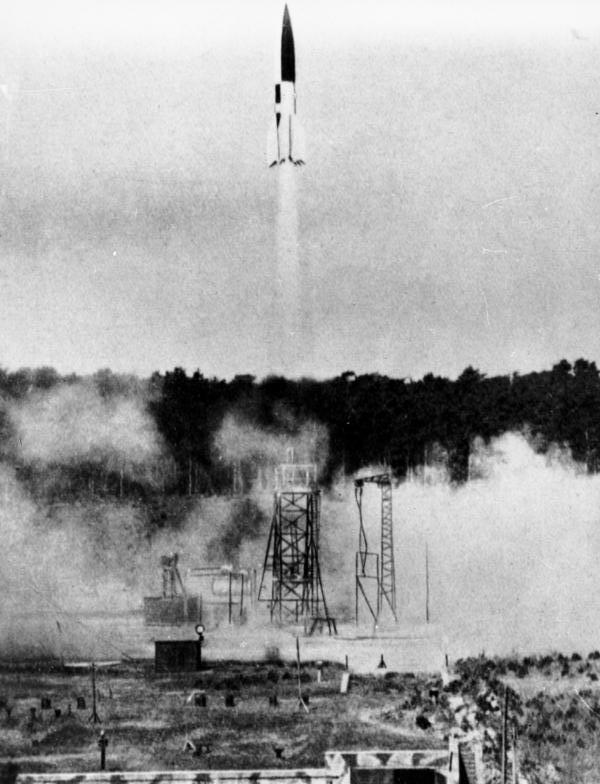
V-2 rocket launching at Peenemünde, on the Baltic German coast (1943).

When the divisions of postwar Europe began to emerge, the war crimes programmes and denazification policies of Britain and the United States were relaxed in favour of recruiting German scientists, especially nuclear and long-range rocket scientists. Many of these, prior to their capture, had worked on developing the German V-2 long-range rocket at the Baltic coast German Army Research Center Peenemünde. Western Allied occupation force officers in Germany were ordered to refuse to cooperate with the Soviets in sharing captured wartime secret weapons, the recovery for which, specifically in regards to advanced German aviation technology and personnel, the British had sent the Fedden Mission into Germany to contact its aviation technology centers and key personnel, paralleled by the United States with its own Operation Lusty aviation technology personnel and knowledge recovery program.

In Operation Paperclip, beginning in 1945, the United States imported 1,600 German scientists and technicians as part of the intellectual reparations owed to the US and the UK, including about $10 billion (US$165 billion in 2025 dollars) in patents and industrial processes. In late 1945, three German rocket-scientist groups arrived in the United States for duty at Fort Bliss, Texas, and at White Sands Proving Grounds, New Mexico, as "War Department Special Employees."

The wartime activities of some Operation Paperclip scientists would later be investigated. Arthur Rudolph left the United States in 1984 in order to not be prosecuted. Similarly, Georg Rickhey, who came to the United States under Operation Paperclip in 1946, was returned to Germany to stand trial at the Mittelbau-Dora war crimes trial in 1947. Following his acquittal, he returned to the United States in 1948 and eventually became a U.S. citizen.

The Soviets began Operation Osoaviakhim in 1946. NKVD and Soviet army units effectively deported thousands of military-related technical specialists from the Soviet occupation zone of post-war Germany to the Soviet Union. The Soviets used 92 trains to transport the specialists and their families, an estimated 10,000 to 15,000 people. Much related equipment was also moved, the aim being to virtually transplant research and production centres, such as the relocated V-2 rocket centre at Mittelwerk Nordhausen, from Germany to the Soviet Union. Among the people moved were Helmut Gröttrup and about two hundred scientists and technicians from Mittelwerk. Personnel were also taken from AEG, BMW's Stassfurt jet propulsion group, IG Farben's Leuna chemical works, Junkers, Schott AG, Siebel, Telefunken, and Carl Zeiss AG.

The operation was commanded by NKVD deputy Colonel General Serov, outside the control of the local Soviet Military Administration. The major reason for the operation was the Soviet fear of being condemned for noncompliance with Allied Control Council agreements on the liquidation of German military installations. Some Western observers thought Operation Osoaviakhim was a retaliation for the failure of the Socialist Unity Party in elections, though Osoaviakhim was clearly planned before that.

== Demise of the League of Nations and the founding of the United Nations ==
As a general consequence of the war and in an effort to maintain international peace, the Allies formed the United Nations, which officially came into existence on 24 October 1945. The United Nations replaced the defunct League of Nations as an intergovernmental organization. The League was formally dissolved on 20 April 1946, but had in practice ceased to function in 1939, being unable to stop the outbreak of World War II. The UN inherited some of the bodies of the League, such as the International Labour Organization.

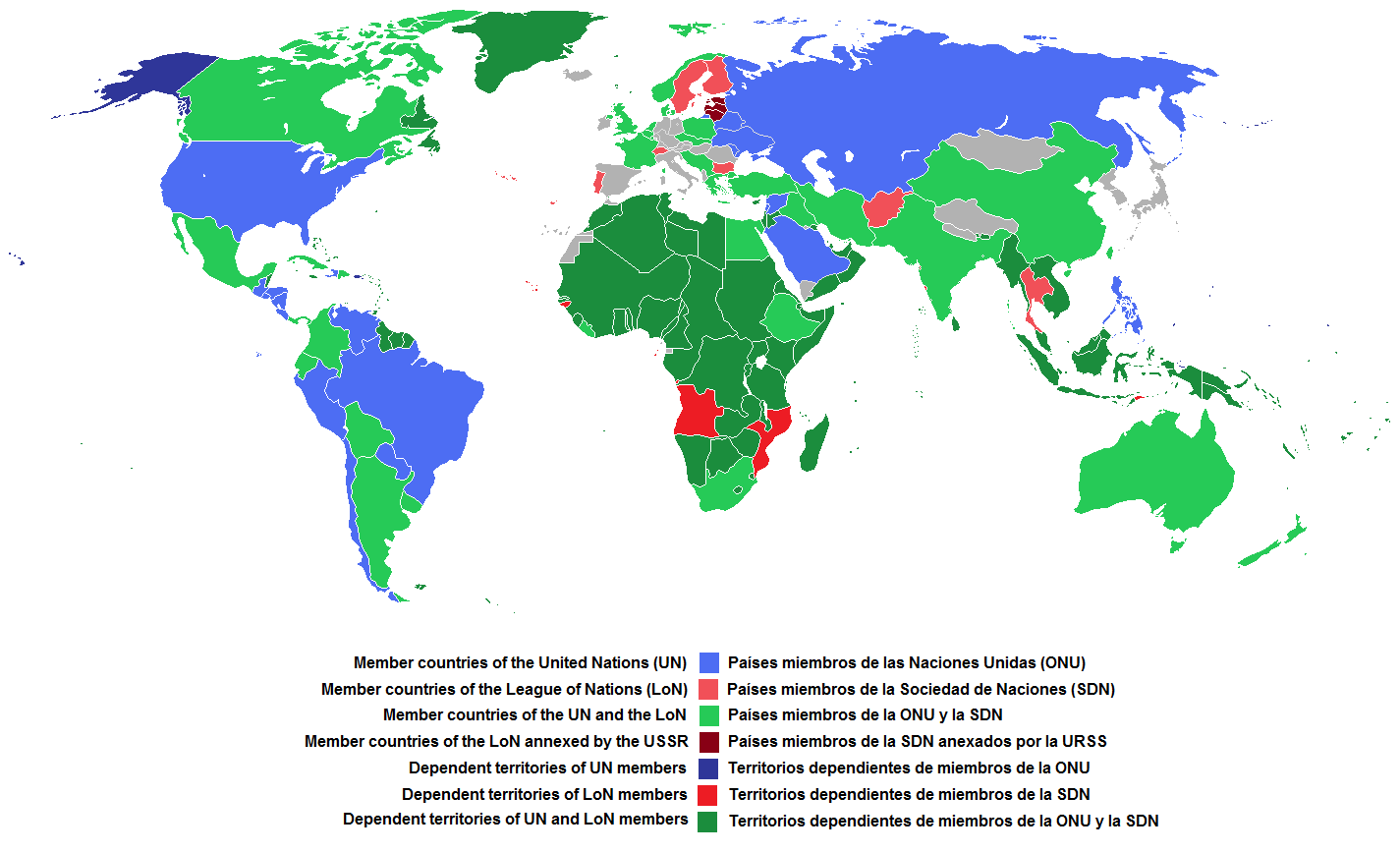
World map showing member states of the United Nations (in green and blue) and member states of the League of Nations (in green and red) on 18 April 1946, when the League of Nations ceased to exist.

League of Nations mandates, mostly territories that had changed hands in World War I, became United Nations trust territories. South West Africa, an exception, was still governed under terms of the original mandate. As the successor body to the League, the United Nations still assumed a supervisory role over the territory. The Free City of Danzig, a semi-autonomous city-state that was partly overseen by the League, became part of Poland.

The United Nations adopted the Universal Declaration of Human Rights in 1948, "as a common standard of achievement for all peoples and all nations." The Soviet Union abstained from voting on adoption of the declaration. The U.S. did not ratify the social and economic rights sections.

The five major Allied powers were given permanent membership in the UN Security Council. The permanent members can veto any Security Council resolution, the only UN decisions that are binding according to international law. The five powers at the time of founding were: the United States, United Kingdom, France, Soviet Union, and Republic of China. The Republic of China lost the Chinese Civil War and retreated to the island of Taiwan by 1950 but continued to be a permanent member of the Council even though the de facto state in control of mainland China was the People's Republic of China (PRC). This was changed in 1971 when the PRC was given the permanent membership previously held by the Republic of China. Russia inherited the permanent membership of the Soviet Union in 1991 after the dissolution of that state.

== Unresolved conflicts ==
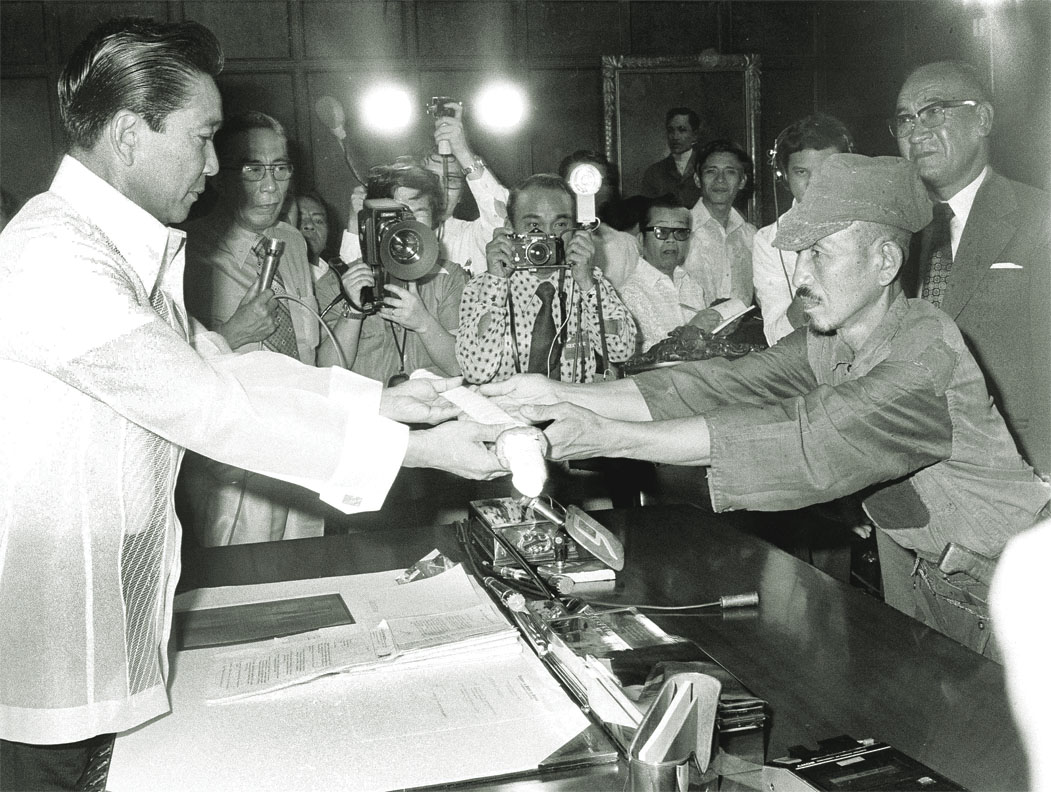
Japanese soldier Hiroo Onoda offering his military sword to Philippine President Ferdinand Marcos on the day of his surrender, 11 March 1974

Japanese holdouts persisted on various islands in the Pacific Theatre until at least 1974. Although all hostilities are now resolved, a peace treaty has never been signed between Japan and Russia due to the Kuril Islands dispute.

== Economic aftermath ==
By the end of the war, the European economy had collapsed with some 70% of its industrial infrastructure destroyed. The property damage in the Soviet Union consisted of complete or partial destruction of 1,710 cities and towns, 70,000 villages/hamlets, and 31,850 industrial establishments. The strength of the economic recovery following the war varied throughout the world, though in general, it was quite robust, particularly in the United States.

In Europe, West Germany, after having continued to decline economically during the first years of the Allied occupation, later experienced a remarkable recovery, and had by the end of the 1950s doubled production from its pre-war levels. Italy came out of the war in poor economic condition, but by the 1950s, the Italian economy was marked by stability and high growth. France rebounded quickly and enjoyed rapid economic growth and modernisation under the Monnet Plan. The United Kingdom, by contrast, was in a state of economic ruin after the war and continued to experience relative economic decline for decades to follow.

The Soviet Union also experienced a rapid increase in production in the immediate post-war era. Japan experienced rapid economic growth, becoming one of the most powerful economies in the world by the 1980s. China, following the conclusion of its civil war, was essentially bankrupt. By 1953, economic restoration seemed fairly successful as production had resumed pre-war levels. Although China's growth rate mostly persisted, it was severely disrupted by the economic experiments of the Great Leap Forward, due to the resulting famine that caused the deaths of 15 to 55 million people.

At the end of the war, the United States produced roughly half of the world's industrial output. The United States, of course, had been spared industrial and civilian devastation. Further, much of its pre-war industry had been converted to wartime usage. As a result, with its industrial and civilian base in much better shape than most of the world, the United States embarked on an economic expansion unseen in human history. U.S. gross domestic product increased from $228 billion in 1945 to just under $1.7 trillion in 1975.

== Denazification ==
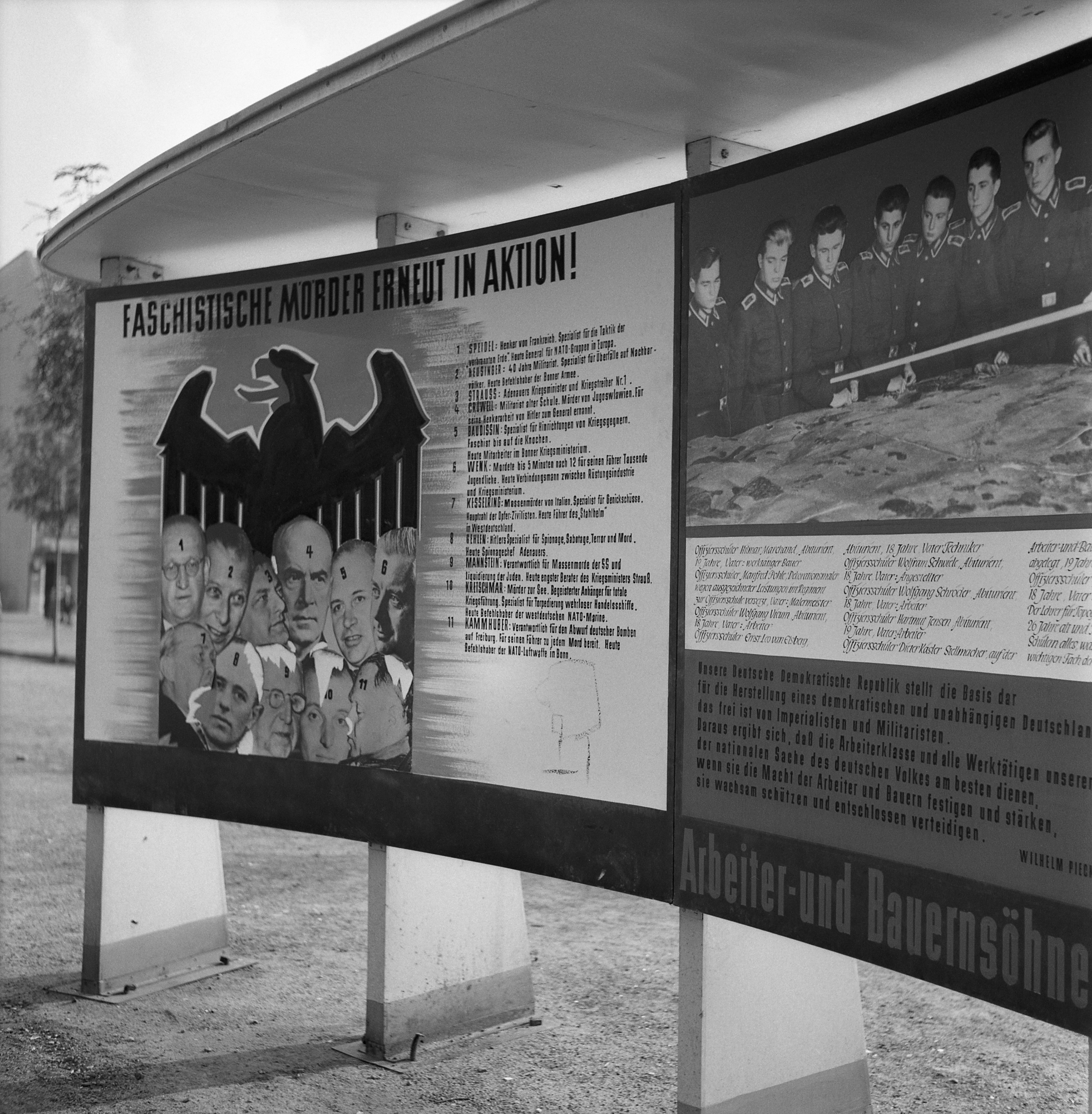
East German propaganda poster in 1957

In 1951 several laws were passed, ending the denazification. As a result, many people with a former Nazi past ended up again in the political apparatus of West Germany. West German President Walter Scheel and Chancellor Kurt Georg Kiesinger were both former members of the Nazi Party. In 1957, 77% of the West German Ministry of Justice's senior officials were former Nazi Party members. Konrad Adenauer's State Secretary Hans Globke had played a major role in drafting antisemitic Nuremberg Race Laws in Nazi Germany.

The historical consensus is that West Germany's efforts at denazification proved wanting.

== Apologies ==
In 2019, the then Germany’s President Frank-Walter Steinmeier has apologized, in Wieluń in Poland, on behalf of Germany, for the “German tyranny” in World War II over Poland.

== Unexploded ordnance ==
Unexploded ordnance continues to pose a danger in the present day. In 2017, 50 thousand people were evacuated from Hanover so World War II era bombs could be defused. As of 2023, it is still thought that thousands of unexploded bombs remain from World War II.

== Environment ==
When World War II ended, scientists did not have procedures for safe disposal of chemical arsenals. At the direction of the UK, US and Russia, chemical weapons were loaded onto ships by the metric ton and dumped into the sea. The exact locations of the dumping are not known due to poor record keeping, but it is estimated that 1 million metric tons of chemical weapons remain on the ocean floor where they are rusting and pose the risk of leaks. Sulfur mustard exposure has been reported in some parts of coastal Italy and sulfur mustard bombs have been found as far as Delaware, likely brought in with the shellfish cargo.

== See also ==
- Aftermath of the Holocaust
- World War II casualties
- Bretton Woods system
- Coming home to liberated France (World War II)
- Western Union (alliance)
- Demobilization of United States Armed Forces after World War II
- Danube River Conference of 1948
- Operation Unthinkable
- Neo-fascism
- Post-fascism

== Bibliography ==
- Bernstein, Seth (2019). "Ambiguous Homecoming: Retribution, Exploitation and Social Tensions During Repatriation to the USSR, 1944–1946". Past & Present. 242 (1): 193–226. doi:10.1093/pastj/gty044.
- Bethell, Nicholas (1974). The Last Secret: Forcible Repatriation to Russia, 1944–47. London: Andre Deutsch. ISBN 978-0-233-96613-7.
- Cook, Bernard A. (2001). Cook, Bernard A. (ed.). Europe since 1945: an encyclopedia. New York: Garland Publishing. ISBN 978-0-8153-1336-6. OCLC 45736680.
- Crampton, R. J. (1997). Eastern Europe in the Twentieth Century-- and After. Psychology Press. ISBN 978-0-415-16422-1.
- Crampton, Richard J. (2003). Eastern Europe in the twentieth century - and after (2nd ed.). London: Routledge. ISBN 978-0-415-16422-1.
- Granville, Johanna C. (2004). The first domino: international decision making during the Hungarian crisis of 1956. Eastern European studies. College Station: Texas A&M University Press. ISBN 978-1-58544-298-0.
- Grenville, John A. S. (2000). A history of the world in the twentieth century. Cambridge, Mass: Belknap Press. ISBN 978-0-674-00280-7.
- Grenville, John Ashley Soames (2005). A History of the World from the 20th to the 21st Century. Routledge. ISBN 0-415-28954-8.
- Naimark, Norman M. (1995). The Russians in Germany: a history of the Soviet Zone of occupation, 1945-1949. Cambridge, Mass: Belknap Press. ISBN 978-0-674-78405-5.
- Roberts, Geoffrey (2006). Stalin's wars: from World War to Cold War, 1939-1953. New Haven [Conn.]; London: Yale University Press. ISBN 978-0-300-11204-7. OCLC 70673207.
- Wettig, Gerhard (2008). Stalin and the Cold War in Europe: the emergence and development of East-West conflict, 1939-1953. The Harvard Cold War Studies Book series. Landham (MD): Rowman & Littlefield. ISBN 978-0-7425-5542-6.
- Zemskov, Viktor (2004). "Репатриация перемещённых советских граждан" [Repatriation of Displaced Soviet Citizens]. Научно-просветительский журнал «Скепсис» (in Russian).
- Zemskov, Viktor (2011). "К вопросу о судьбе советских репатриантов в СССР (1944-1955)" [The Fate of Soviet Repatriates in the USSR (1944-1955)]. Политическое просвещение (Politpros.com) (in Russian).
