= FEC =

FEC or Fec may refer to:

== Organisations ==
- Ecuadorian Cycling Federation (Spanish: Federación Ecuatoriana de Ciclismo)
- Family Equality Council, an American civil rights advocacy group
- Far East Consortium, a property development and investment company in Hong Kong
- Far East Council, of American Scouting overseas
- Fec Publishing, a German publisher
- Federation of Egalitarian Communities, in the United States
- Federation of Employees and Managers, French trade union
- Fellow of Engineers Canada
- Fellowship of Evangelical Churches, an American church group
- Food Editors' Club Germany
- Frank Erwin Center, on the campus of the University of Texas

=== Education ===
- Far Eastern College, in Manila, Philippines
- Further education college, in the United Kingdom

=== Government and politics ===
- Far Eastern Commission, in post-war Japan
- Federal Election Commission, in the United States
- Federal Executive Council, in Australia
- Federal Executive Council, in Nigeria
- Federal Executive Council, in Yugoslavia
- Ferrol en Común, a Galician political coalition

== People ==
- Michael Atherton (born 1968), English cricketer, nickname FEC
- Tom Fec (born 1980), American electronic musician

== Science and technology ==
- Fecal egg count, in parasitology
- Forward error correction, in data transmission
- Forwarding equivalence class, in networking
- Fluorouracil (5-FU), epirubicin, cyclophosphamide, a chemotherapy regimen

== Transport ==
- Feira de Santana Airport (IATA: FEC), in Brazil
- Florida East Coast Railway, an American railroad

== Other uses ==
- Family entertainment center, a type of small amusement park
- Foreign exchange certificate, a tool for foreign exchange control

== See also ==
- FECC (disambiguation)
