= Hungerwinter =

Hungerwinter may refer to:

- The Dutch famine of 1944
- The famine in occupied Germany in 1947
