= History of German journalism =

The history of German journalism dates back to the 16th century. Johannes Gutenberg, a German, invented the printing press, while the world's first newspapers were produced in the Holy Roman Empire of the German Nation in the 17th century.

== Early developments ==
Merchants in early modern Europe exchanged financial and commercial news, and some started regular newsletters for their clients. One example of this type of merchant was the 16th-century German financiar, Fugger. He not only received business news from his correspondents, but also sensationalist and gossip news as well. It is evident in Fugger's correspondence with his network that fiction and fact were both significant parts of early news publications. 16th century Germany also saw subscription-based, handwritten news. Those who subscribed to these publications were generally low-level government officials and also merchants. They could not afford other types of news publications, but had enough money to pay for a subscription, which was still expensive for the time.

In the 16th and 17th century, there appeared numerous printed news sheets summarizing accounts of battles, treaties, kings, epidemics, and special events. Early forms of news periodicals were the so-called Messrelationen ("trade fair reports") which were compiled twice a year, for the large book fairs in Frankfurt and Leipzig respectively, starting in the 1580s. In 1605, the German Johann Carolus published the world's first newspaper in Straßburg, consisting of brief news bulletins. The world's first daily newspaper appeared in 1650 in Leipzig. Later, Prussia increasingly became the largest and most dominant of the German states, but it had newspapers that were kept under very tight control. Advertising was forbidden, and budgets were very small.

The term newspaper became common in the 17th century. However, publications that resemble modern-day newspaper publications were appearing as early as the 16th century in Germany. They were discernibly newspapers for the following reasons: they were printed, dated, appeared at regular and frequent publication intervals, and included a variety of news items. The first newspaper according to modern definitions was the Relation aller Fürnemmen und gedenckwürdigen Historien of Johann Carolus, in the early 17th century. German newspapers were organized by the location from which they came, and by date. They differed from avisis in that they employed a distinct and highly illustrated title page, and they applied an overall date to each issue.

The emergence of the new media branch was based on the spread of the printing press from which the publishing press derives its name. Historian Johannes Weber stated: "At the same time, then, as the printing press in the physical, technological sense was invented, 'the press' in the extended sense of the word also entered the historical stage. The phenomenon of publishing was born. The German-language Relation aller Fürnemmen und gedenckwürdigen Historien, printed from 1605 onwards by Johann Carolus in Straßburg, was the first newspaper."

== German Confederation, 1815–1867 ==
A large number of newspapers and magazines flourished. A typical small city had one or two newspapers; Berlin and Leipzig had dozens. The audience was limited to around five percent of the adult men, chiefly from the aristocratic and middle classes. Liberal papers outnumbered conservative ones by a wide margin. Foreign governments bribed editors to guarantee a favorable image. Censorship was strict, and the government issued the political news they were supposed to report. After 1871, strict press laws were used by Bismarck to shut down the socialists, and to threaten hostile editors. There were no national newspapers. Editors focused on political commentary, but also included a nonpolitical cultural page, focused on the arts and high culture. Especially popular was the serialized novel, with a new chapter every week. Magazines were politically more influential, and attracted the leading intellectuals as authors.

== Weimar Republic ==
The Weimar Republic's constitution along with other social forces and the earlier Reich press law of 1874 gave rise to a dispersed, energetic and pluralistic press with a wide range of political opinion after the Great War. The Generalanzeiger and the Boulevardblatt established consumer bases decades earlier. Wire news service and newspaper commercial lending by Ruhr industrial interests sought to influence editorial opinion prior to the Great War and during the republic.

== 1945–1955 ==
In 1945, the occupying powers took over all newspapers in Germany and purged them of Nazi influence. The American occupation headquarters, the Office of Military Government, United States (OMGUS) began its own newspaper based in Munich, Die Neue Zeitung. It was edited by German and Jewish émigrés who fled to the United States before the war. Its mission was to encourage democracy by exposing Germans to how American culture operated. The paper was filled with details on American sports, politics, business, Hollywood, and fashions, as well as international affairs.

== See also ==
- History of journalism
- Magazines
- Newspapers
