= CARE Package =

Food or supplies sent as humanitarian aid, originally by CARE

The CARE Package was the original unit of aid distributed by the humanitarian organization CARE (Cooperative for Assistance and Relief Everywhere). Originally CARE was dubbed the Cooperative for American Remittances to Europe, and in 1946 CARE sent the world's first CARE Package. Although "CARE Package" is a registered trademark, the term has since been widely adopted as a generic term for a parcel of food or supplies sent for relief or comfort purposes.

== Origin ==
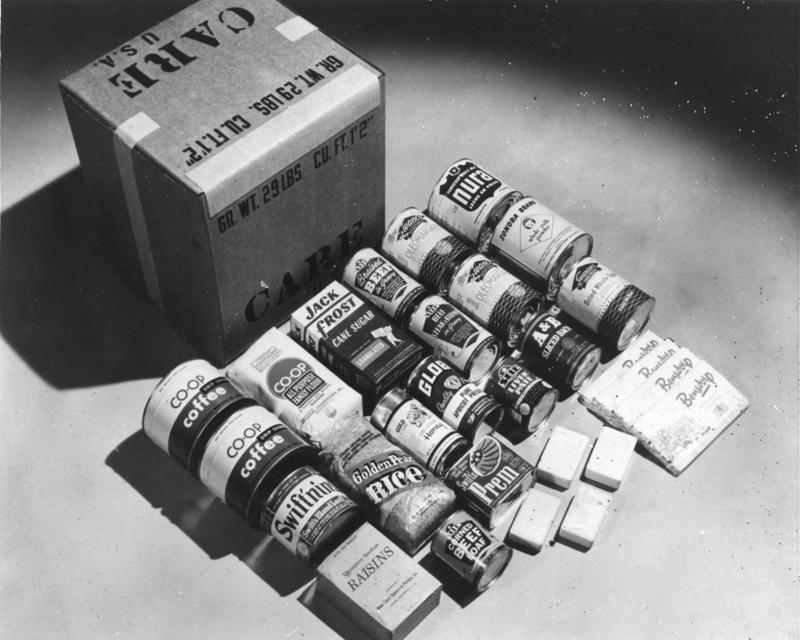
Contents of a CARE Package in 1948

In 1945, the newly formed CARE (then the Cooperative for American Remittances to Europe) initiated a program to send food relief to Europe, where large numbers of people were at risk of starvation in the wake of World War II. Arthur Ringland and Dr. Lincoln Clark approached 22 American charities to propose a non-profit corporation to funnel food parcels from Americans to loved ones in Europe. The charities agreed and on November 27, they incorporated CARE.

CARE's leaders worked with the U.S. Army to acquire 2.8 million Army surplus "10-in-1" food rations that had been stockpiled for an invasion of Japan that never transpired. These parcels, a form of MRE (Meals Ready to Eat), were sent to Europe. These rations become the world's first CARE Packages. After six months, CARE delivered the first CARE Packages to the battered port city of Le Havre, France.

=== Founding charities ===
Following are the original 22 founding organizations that supported CARE and the original CARE Package:

- American Christian Committee for Refugees
- American Friends Service Committee
- American Jewish Joint Distribution Committee
- American Relief for Czechoslovakia
- American Relief for France
- American Relief for Norway
- American Relief for Poland
- Committee on Christian Science Wartime Activities for the Mother Church
- Congressional Christian Services Committee (United Church for World Ministries)
- Cooperative League of the USA
- International Rescue and Relief Committee
- National CIO War Relief Committee
- Paderewski Testimonial Fund
- Save the Children Federation
- Tolstoy Foundation
- Unitarian Service Committee
- United Lithuanian Relief Fund of America
- United Ukrainian American Relief Committee
- United Yugoslav Relief Fund of America
- War Relief Services, National Catholic Welfare Conference (Catholic Relief Services)
- YMCA World Emergency and War Victims Fund

== Distribution ==
The first 20,000 packages reached the port of Le Havre, France, on May 11, 1946.

Initially, senders had to specify a recipient for a package, but over the course of time the nature of distribution changed and packages were sent to target areas as opposed to specific individuals.

On June 5, 1946, the prohibition against sending CARE packages to occupied Germany was rescinded. On June 6 General Lucius D. Clay signed the CARE treaty permitting the distribution of packages in the U.S. occupation zone, on June 21 the British also signed the treaty. Marie Pierre Kœnig signed the treaty in December 1946, thus permitting the distribution of CARE packages also in the French occupation zone. The first CARE packages for distribution in the U.S. zone landed in Bremen harbor in August 1946, while the first packages for the French zone were distributed in Freiburg in December 1946. By 1960, when operations in West Germany ended, CARE had distributed 83,000 tonnes of aid in West Germany. Operations continued until 1962 in West Berlin.

CARE phased out CARE Packages in the 1960s as its work began to focus on long-term projects in addition to emergency relief.

== CARE Package 2020 ==
In May 2020, CARE launched a new CARE Package in order to respond to the COVID-19 Pandemic. Today's CARE Package marks the first time CARE has included the United States in the list of countries requiring urgent humanitarian support. CARE Packages for Frontline Heroes and CARE Package Relief are CARE's first U.S.-based aid initiatives. In addition to the U.S. distribution, CARE will launch CARE Packages for Global Communities, which will allow donors to support COVID-19 initiatives in Ecuador and Sierra Leone.

Today's CARE Package features ways to support frontline, medical workers, caregivers, individuals in need, and communities in the U.S. and around the world affected by the COVID-19 pandemic with digital, physical, and financial support. The program will provide monetary assistance, food, and essential supplies to individuals in need and at risk in the form of CARE Packages.

== In popular culture ==
In the United States and the United Kingdom, the term "care package" has come to be applied to packages of food and other goodies sent to absent friends and relations, particularly to college students, by their families. Numerous companies now offer pre-assembled packages that can be ordered for delivery. The term has been adapted in other languages such as German, where „CARE Pakete“ are a common practice as well.

== See also ==
- GARIOA
- CRALOG
- UNRRA
- HeroBox
- Westpaket
