= Food Editors' Club Germany =

The Food Editors' Club Germany (FEC) is the professional association of specialist culinary journalists in Germany. The club currently has about 150 members.

== History ==
The association evolved from a circle of friends and colleagues from a variety of backgrounds. They occasionally met in the post-war years to keep each other up-to-date in a reliable way and as neutrally as possible, in a press environment where information on food and drink was still scarce. In 1968, this culminated in the Food Editors’ Club Germany being set up. Arne Krüger was the first Chairman from 1968 to 1979. His successors were Gisa v. Barsewisch and Holger Hofmann (1979-1989), Antje Blum (1989-1993), Bernd Neuner-Duttenhofer (1993-2001) and Peter Zöls (since 2001). There are regional groups in Berlin, Northern Germany, the Rhein-Main area and Southern Germany.

== Social investment ==
With its FEC award, the Food Editors‘ Club Germany supports personalities who stand up for people in difficult situations.

== Conferences ==
The members of the FEC meet annually for their annual conference in a variety of locations; this is also when the annual general meeting is held. The annual conferences and the work of the food journalists are widely reported in the regional media. Several times a year, the regional groups organise information events in the regions for their members.
