= FECC =

FECC may refer to:

- Federation of European Carnival Cities
- FIBA Europe Champions Cup (disambiguation)
  - FIBA EuroCup Challenge, transnational professional continental club basketball competition in Europe (defunct)
  - original name of EuroLeague
