= Messrelation =

A Messrelation (IPA: /ˈmɛsʀɛlaˌt͡si̯oːn/, Early Modern German for 'trade fair report') was a print published in the 16th to 18th century for the book fairs in Frankfurt and Leipzig (the largest in Europe at their time) which reported news about political and military news since the last fair. Messrelationen are seen as precursors to modern newspapers as they were the first printed news media to be published periodically.

The Austrian scholar Michael von Aitzing (ca. 1530–1598) is commonly seen as their inventor, having published for the first time a Relatio Historica ('Historical Report', printed in Cologne) at the autumn 1583 book fair in Frankfurt, in which he related the events in the Low Countries since February 1580 on 144 quarto pages. This was a huge success and from 1588 Aitzing published his "relations" twice a year, for the Easter book fair at Leipzig and for the autumn book fair at Frankfurt. Since 1590, competitors published their own Messrelationen. The first one from Frankfurt was published in 1591 (running until 1806), the first one from Leipzig in 1605 (running until 1730).

The historian Ulrich Rosseaux argues „to view the Messrelationen as a separate type of Early Modern media whose essential properties are the periodicity, respectability and compactness of its reports. From the perspective of their publishers, they acted as a continuously amended chronicle of the present and therefore a constitutive part of contemporaneous historiography.“

The Messrelationen, which encompassed on average 100 pages, drew their news from correspondents or (non-periodical) newssheets (Newe Zeytungen). Often they contained reports by postmasters, merchants or travellers.
