= Council of Relief Agencies Licensed to Operate in Germany =

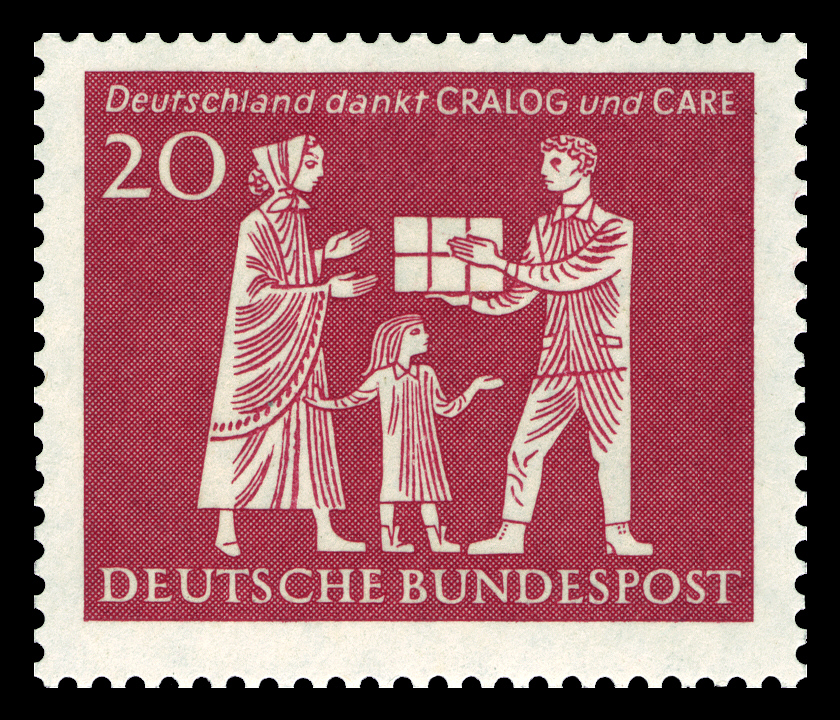
- Social help by Cralog and Care
- Abbreviation: CRALOG
- Formation: 1946
- Founder: American Council of Voluntary Agencies for Foreign Service
- Type: Non governmental organization

The Council of Relief Agencies Licensed to Operate in Germany (CRALOG) was a nongovernmental organization created in 1946 by the American Council of Voluntary Agencies for Foreign Service and included 11 major relief agencies such as the International Red Cross.

Food relief shipments to Germany had been prohibited by the U.S. until December 1945, since "they might tend to negate the policy of restricting the German standard of living to the average of the surrounding European nations".

CRALOG was created after the American Council had dispatched a survey team to occupied Germany, which had reported back on the situation in February 1946. CRALOG was then on February 19, 1946, established and designated by the Truman administration in a directive on relief contributions to Germany as the only medium through which aid to the U.S. occupation zone could be channeled.

The survey team had been permitted to visit Germany only after President Truman had been subjected to increased pressure both by the American Congress and public. In January 1946 34 U.S. senators had petitioned that private relief organizations be allowed to help Germany and Austria, stating that the desperate food situation in occupied Germany "presents a picture of such frightful horror as to stagger the imagination, evidence which increasingly marks the United States as an accomplice in a terrible crime against humanity."

The Governors of the Western Allied Occupation Zones in Germany signed contracts permitting CRALOG to provide relief in their respective zones as follows: General Lucius D. Clay, military governor of the U.S. occupation zone signed on January 29, 1946, the UK governor signed on July 12, 1946, and the French on July 30, 1946. The Allied Kommandatura that jointly ruled Berlin signed in April 1947.

A relief worker described the situation encountered in Germany in 1946 as follows:

Starvation is not the dramatic thing one so often reads and imagines... of people in mobs crying for food and falling over in the streets. The starving... those who are dying never say anything and one rarely sees them. They first become listless and weak, they react quickly to cold and chills, they sit staring in their rooms or lie listlessly in their beds... one day they just die. The doctor usually diagno-ses malnutrition and complications resulting therefrom. Old women and kids usually die first because they are weak and are unable to get out and scrounge for the extra food it takes to live. It is pretty hard for an American who has lacked enough food to become ravenously hungry perhaps only once or twice in a lifetime to understand what real starvation is.

The first CRALOG shipment arrived in Bremen harbor in April 1946, and by the termination of the program in 1962, it had dispatched 300,000 tons of aid to Germany.

== See also ==
- American food policy in occupied Germany
- Elsa Brändström
- CARE Package (CARE was created by the same organization as CRALOG)
- GARIOA
- Licensed Agencies for Relief in Asia
- UNRRA
- Other Losses
- The President's Economic Mission to Germany and Austria
