= Miriam Gebhardt =

German historian and writer (born 1962)

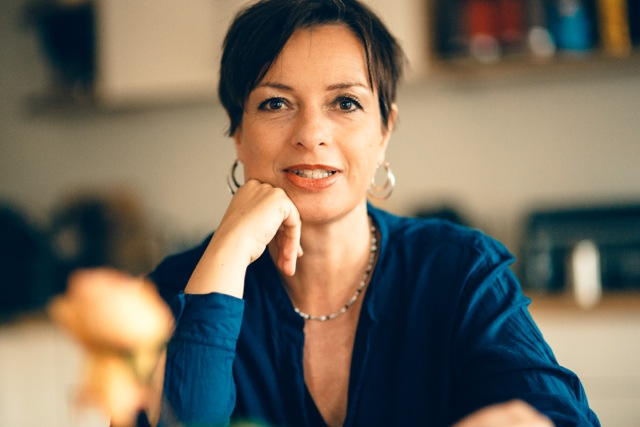
- Born: 28 January 1962 (age 64); Freiburg, West Germany

Academic background
- Doctoral advisor: Clemens Wischermann

Academic work
- Discipline: Contemporary German history
- Website: www.miriamgebhardt.de

Miriam Gebhardt (born 28 January 1962) is a German historian and writer.

== Life ==
Gebhardt was born in Freiburg, Germany and trained as a journalist. From 1982, she worked as an editor. From 1988 to 1993, she studied social and economic history, regional history and modern German literature at LMU Munich. In 1988, she obtained a doctorate in Modern History under Clemens Wischermann at the University of Münster with a thesis on family memories.

From 2003, Gebhardt held an academic post at Collaborative Research Centre 485 (Norm and Symbol) at the University of Konstanz, where she obtained her habilitation in Modern and Contemporary History in July 2008. She currently lectures at the University of Konstanz as an adjunct professor and writes non-fiction books.

Gebhardt also works as a journalist and publicist and has written for Die Zeit.

In a book published in 2015, Als die Soldaten kamen (When the Soldiers Came), she drew attention to rapes committed by allied soldiers, including the western allies, in the aftermath of World War II. It drew media attention in Germany and abroad.

== Publications ==
- Das Familiengedächtnis. Erinnerung im deutsch-jüdischen Bürgertum 1890 bis 1932 [The Family Memory. Memories in the German-Jewish Bourgeoisie from 1890 to 1932] (in German). Stuttgart: Steiner. 1999. ISBN 3-515-07560-7.
- Sünde, Seele, Sex. Das Jahrhundert der Psychologie [Sin, Soul, Sex. The Century of Psychology] (in German). Stuttgart: DVA. 2002. ISBN 3-421-05641-2.
- Die Angst vor dem kindlichen Tyrannen. Eine Geschichte der Erziehung im 20. Jahrhundert [The Fear of the Child Tyrant. A History of Education in the 20th Century] (in German). München: DVA. 2009. ISBN 978-3-421-04413-6.
- Rudolf Steiner. Ein moderner Prophet [Rudolf Steiner: A modern Prophet] (in German). München: DVA. 2011. ISBN 978-3-421-04473-0.
- Alice im Niemandsland: Wie die deutsche Frauenbewegung die Frauen verlor [Alice in No Man's Land: How the German Women's Movement Lost the Women] (in German). München: DVA. 2012. ISBN 978-3-421-04411-2.
- Als die Soldaten kamen. Die Vergewaltigung deutscher Frauen am Ende des Zweiten Weltkriegs [When the Soldiers Came: The Rape of German Women at the End of the Second World War] (in German). München: DVA. 2015. ISBN 978-3-421-04633-8.

=== As editor ===
- With Katja Patzel-Mattern and Stefan Zahlmann:

Das integrative Potential von Elitenkulturen: Festschrift für Clemens Wischermann[The Integrative Potential of Elite Cultures: Festschrift for Clemens Wischermann]. Steiner, Stuttgart 2013, ISBN 978-3-515-10070-0.
