= Food in occupied Germany =

Overview of the food supply policies in occupied Germany

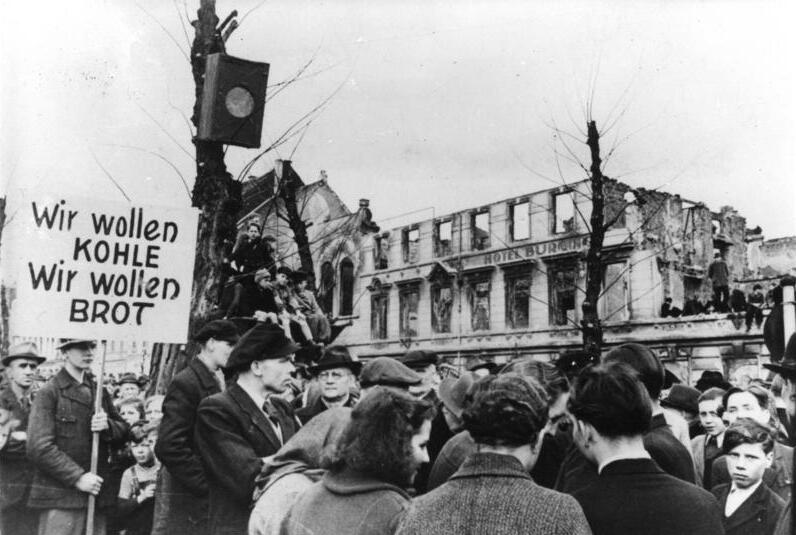
The hunger-winter of 1947, thousands protest against the disastrous food situation (March 31, 1947).

American food policy in occupied Germany refers to the food supply policies enacted by the U.S., and to some extent its Allies, in the western occupation zones of Germany in the first two years of the ten-year postwar occupation of Western Germany following World War II.

== Background ==
Shortly before the outbreak of World War II, the German government instituted rationing which resulted in the restricted availability of food. Occasional shortages of food occurred during the war; thus, a black market developed. However, supplies were generally adequate, especially in comparison to the situation in some other European countries. This was in part due to the ruthless exploitation of occupied countries by the German government, which utilized policies such as the "Hunger Plan", which resulted in the deaths of millions of people in German-occupied areas of the Soviet Union when food supplies were redirected to Germany and the German military units operating in the USSR, and the German blockade which resulted in the Dutch famine of 1944–45. Inadequate food rations also formed part of the Holocaust, resulting in tens of thousands of deaths in Warsaw alone, and around two million Soviet prisoners of war were starved to death by German forces over the winter of 1941/42.

Widespread food shortages first began to occur in Germany following the end of the war in May 1945. The production of food was disrupted by the effects of the war, including the destruction of farmland, livestock, and machinery. In addition, labor shortages developed when slave laborers who had been forced to work on German farms returned to their homes. The situation was worsened by a period of poor weather. As a result, the output of German farms was sufficient to provide city residents with only 4,200 kilojoules (1,000 kilocalories) of nutrition per day. At this time, food supplies were limited across much of Europe, including the United Kingdom and France, resulting in continued rationing.

== Planning for the occupation of Germany ==
During the planning for the occupation of Germany, the Allies were faced with the issue of whether food allocations for the country should be set at either the minimum needed to avoid disease and political disorder, or levels sufficient to fully meet the population's needs. A principle of ensuring that Germans had no better access to food than the worst-affected Allied country was adopted, but not applied in practice. The Supreme Headquarters Allied Expeditionary Force initially set the ration scale for Germans at 11,000 kJ (2,600 kcal) per day, the same as levels in Belgium and France and at the top of the scale considered adequate by the United Nations Relief and Rehabilitation Administration.

Once the occupation of Germany commenced, it proved impossible to deliver the intended levels of food. The Allied planners underestimated the extent of the damage to German infrastructure, and overestimated the ability of Germans to grow their own food. As a result, once supplies which had been stockpiled by the German government during the war ran out, the ration scales were reduced to 4,200–5,200 kJ (1,000–1,250 kcal) per day. Most German civilians were able to supplement these rations, however. Displaced persons, including Holocaust survivors, were allocated more generous rations. These averaged only between 6,700 and 8,400 kJ (1,600 and 2,000 kcal) per day, and few of the displaced persons were able to access other sources of food.

== Captured German soldiers ==
After the German surrender, the U.S. chose to designate large numbers of German prisoners as Disarmed Enemy Forces (DEF) instead of using the Prisoner of War status, under which the captives would have been under the protection of the Geneva convention and, therefore, would have been entitled to the same quantities of food as U.S. troops.

The conditions these prisoners had to endure were often harsh. A number of the camps in Western Germany, especially initially, were huge wired-in enclosures lacking sufficient shelter and other necessities. (see Rheinwiesenlager) Since there was no longer a danger of German retaliation against Allied POWs, "less effort was put into finding ways of procuring scarce food and shelter than would otherwise have been the case, and, consequently, tens of thousands of prisoners died from hunger and disease who might have been saved".

The International Red Cross was never permitted to fully involve itself in the situation in DEF or SEP camps; even though conditions in them gradually improved, even the most conservative estimates put the death toll in French camps alone at over 16,500 in 1945.

After the German surrender, the International Red Cross was prohibited from providing aid such as food or visiting the prisoner camps. However, after making approaches to the Allies in the fall of 1945, it was allowed to investigate the camps in the UK and French occupation zones of Germany, respectively, as well as to provide relief to the prisoners held there.

On February 4, 1946, the Red Cross was permitted to visit and assist prisoners also in the U.S. occupation zone of Germany, although only with very small quantities of food. During their visits, the delegates observed that German prisoners of war were often detained in appalling conditions. They drew the attention of the authorities to this fact, and gradually succeeded in getting some improvements made.

== German civilian population ==
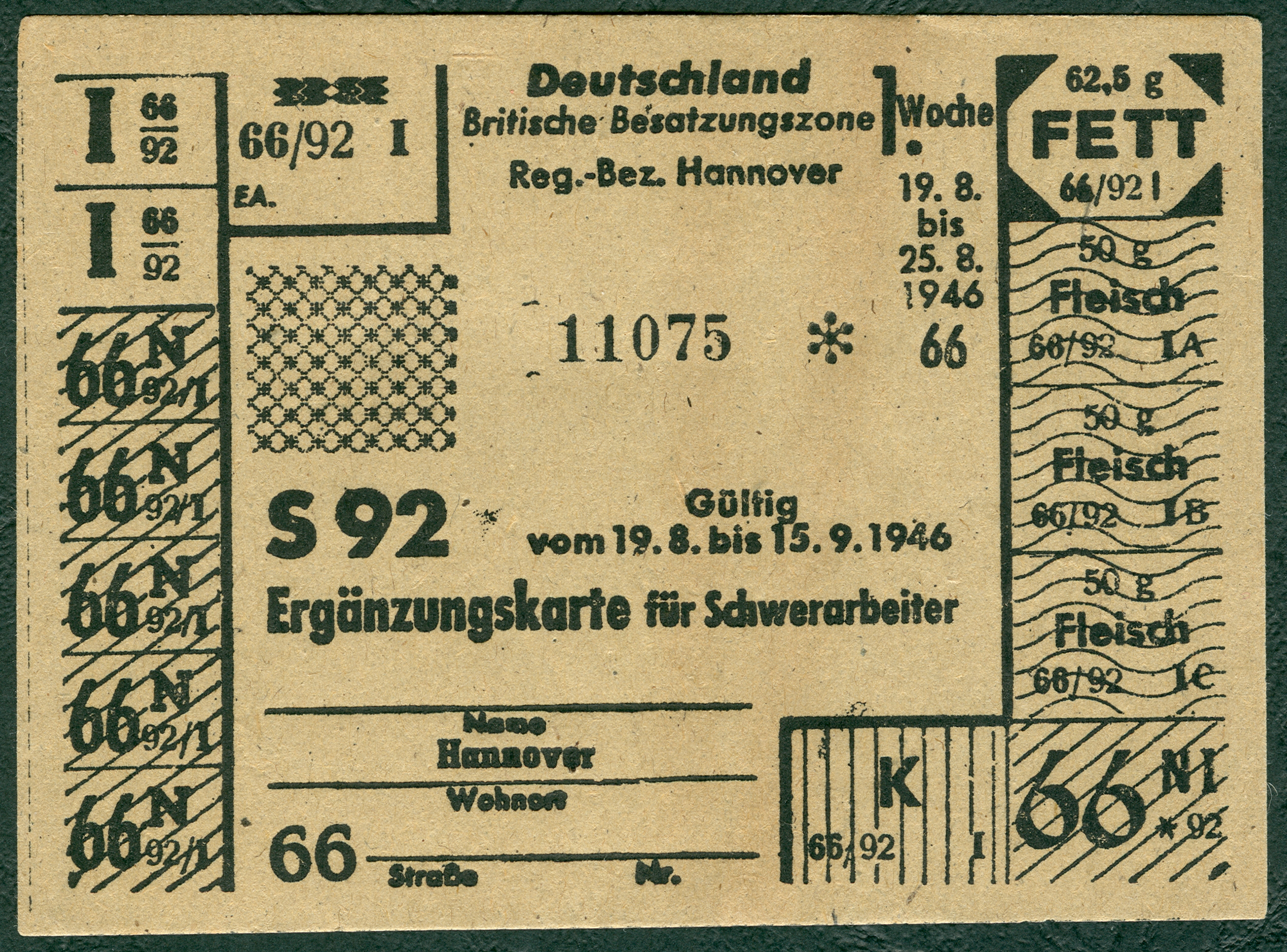
Ration card for a manual labourer in the British zone (1946).

The German Red Cross, which during the war had become thoroughly Nazified with its head Ernst Grawitz a major figure in medical experiments on Jews and "enemies of the state", was dissolved, and the International Red Cross and the few other allowed international relief agencies were kept from helping Germans through strict controls on supplies and on travel.

During 1945, it was estimated that the average German civilian in the U.S. and the United Kingdom occupation zones received 5,000 kJ (1,200 kcal) a day. Meanwhile, non-German Displaced Persons were receiving 9,600 kJ (2,300 kcal) through emergency food imports and Red Cross help.

Fearing a Nazi uprising, U.S. occupation forces were under strict orders not to share their food with the German population; these orders also applied to their wives when they arrived later in the occupation. The women were under orders not to allow their German maids to get hold of any leftovers; "the food was to be destroyed or made inedible", although in view of the starving German population facing them many housewives chose to disregard these official orders. Nevertheless, according to a U.S. intelligence survey a German university professor reportedly said: "Your soldiers are good-natured, good ambassadors; but they create unnecessary ill will to pour 20 liters [5 U.S. gallons] of leftover cocoa in the gutter when it is badly needed in our clinics. It makes it hard for me to defend American democracy among my countrymen."

In early 1946, U.S. President Harry S. Truman allowed foreign relief organizations to enter Germany in order to review the food situation. In mid-1946, non-German relief organizations were permitted to help starving German children. The German food situation became worst during the very cold winter of 1946–47, when German food energy intake ranged from 4,200 to 6,300 kJ (1,000 to 1,500 kcal) per day, a situation made worse by severe lack of fuel for heating. Average adult food energy intake in the U.S was 13,000–14,000 kJ (3,200–3,300 kcal), in the UK 12,000 kJ (2,900 kcal) and in the U.S. Army 17,000 kJ (4,000 kcal).

The precise effect of the food crisis on German health and mortality has been a matter of some contention. Speaking of the Anglo-American zones, Herbert Hoover reported that in the fall of 1946, starvation produced a 40 percent increase in mortality among Germans over 70. However, John Farquharson cites statistics indicating that the incidence of hunger-induced edema was low in 1946–1947. According to the British Medical Journal, mortality in the British zone was above its pre-war level until June 1946, when the death rate fell below that of 1938. Also, once it became clear there would be no rising, as threatened by the Nazis during the war, food controls were relaxed.

The historian Nicholas Balabkins notes that the Allied restrictions placed on German steel production, and their control over where the produced coal and steel was delivered, meant that offers by Western European nations to trade food for desperately needed German coal and machinery were rejected. Neither the Italians nor the Dutch could sell the vegetables that they had previously sold in Germany, with the consequence that the Dutch had to destroy considerable proportions of their crop. Denmark offered 150 tons of lard a month; Turkey offered hazelnuts; Norway offered fish and fish oil; Sweden offered considerable amounts of fats. The Allies were however unwilling to let the Germans trade.

Another consequence of the Allied policy of "Industrial Disarmament" (see The industrial plans for Germany) was that there was a drastic fall in fertilizer available for German agriculture, thus further decreasing foodstuff production capacity.

The German infant mortality rate was twice that of other nations in Western Europe until the close of 1948.

The adequate feeding of the German population in occupied Germany was an Allied legal obligation under Article 43 of The 1907 Hague Rules of Land Warfare.

== JCS 1067 ==
The "Handbook for Military Government in Germany", an occupation document which advocated a quick restoration of normal life for the German people and reconstruction of Germany, was ready in August 1944. The secretary of the U.S. Treasury Henry Morgenthau Jr., author of the Morgenthau Plan for partition and deindustrialization of postwar Germany, brought it to the attention of President Franklin D. Roosevelt who after reading it accepted it enthusiastically with the words:

Too many people here and in England hold the view that the German people as a whole are not responsible for what has taken place – that only a few Nazis are responsible. That unfortunately is not based on fact. The German people must have it driven home to them that the whole nation has been engaged in a lawless conspiracy against the decencies of modern civilization.

However, after opposition from some members of the US government, a revised document was drafted, the Joint Chiefs of Staff directive 1067 (JCS 1067). Here the military government of occupation was ordered to "take no steps looking toward the economic rehabilitation of Germany [or] designed to maintain or strengthen the German economy" and it was also ordered that starvation, disease and civil unrest were to be kept below such levels where they would pose a danger to the troops of occupation.

On March 20, 1945, President Roosevelt was warned that the JCS 1067 was not severe enough: it would let the Germans "stew in their own juice". Roosevelt's response was "Let them have soup kitchens! Let their economy sink!" Asked if he wanted the German people to starve, he replied, "Why not?"

By August 1945 General Clay was becoming increasingly concerned about the humanitarian and political situation in the area under his responsibility. He stated "There is no choice between being a communist on 1,500 calories [6,300 kJ] a day and a believer in democracy on 1,000 calories [4,200 kJ]".

Two years later, in July 1947, JCS 1067 was scrapped and replaced by JCS 1779 which noted that "an orderly, prosperous Europe requires the economic contributions of a stable and productive Germany."

General Clay would later remark in his memoirs that "there was no doubt that JCS 1067 contemplated the Carthaginian peace which dominated our operations in Germany during the early months of occupation."

== Consequences ==
Nicholas Balabkins takes a favorable view of Allied policy, asserting that American food shipments saved the lives of "millions of Germans", although shortages persisted into 1948. Balabkins also notes that some distributed food rations were of poor composition and "considerably below minimum nutrition standards"; without access to additional food from alternative sources recipients would eventually fall prey to starvation. Balabkins also cites an authority who stated that the rations "represented a fairly rapid starvation level", showing the need for the supplemental rations that were provided.

== See also ==
- Allied plans for German industry after World War II
- CARE (relief agency)
- Council of Relief Agencies Licensed to Operate in Germany (CRALOG)
- Forced labor of Germans after World War II
- Government Aid and Relief in Occupied Areas (GARIOA)
- Hunger Plan
