= FIBA Europe Champions Cup =

FIBA Europe Champions Cup may refer to:

- Original name of EuroLeague
- FIBA EuroCup Challenge
