= GARIOA =

Emergency aid program

Government Aid and Relief in Occupied Areas (GARIOA) was a program under which the United States after the 1945 end of World War II from 1946 onwards provided emergency aid to the occupied nations of Japan, Germany, and Austria. The aid was predominantly in the form of food to alleviate starvation in the occupied areas.

== Germany ==
Germany received GARIOA help between July 1946 and March 1950. In 1946, the US Congress had voted GARIOA funds to prevent "such disease and unrest as would endanger the forces of occupation" in occupied Germany. Congress stipulated that the funds were only to be used to import food, petroleum and fertilizers. Use of GARIOA funds to import raw materials of vital importance to the German industry was explicitly forbidden. At the time the US still operated under the occupation directive JCS 1067 which directed US forces to "take no steps looking toward the economic rehabilitation of Germany [or] designed to maintain or strengthen the German economy". (see Industrial plans for Germany after World War II)

In 1948 the combined US, UK and France expenditure on relief food in Germany stood at a total of close to $1.5 billion. Still, German food rations were deficient in composition and remained far below recommended minimum nutrition levels. Officials in authority admitted that the distributed rations "represented a fairly rapid starvation level".

The aid received by Germany through GARIOA was, just as the later Marshall Plan aid (starting 1948), charged to the Germans. By 1953 West Germany's combined GARIOA and Marshall Plan debt was over $3.3 billion. It was however decided in 1953 that West Germany only had to repay $1.1 billion. The amount was repaid by 1971.

During 1945 private organizations such as the International Red Cross had been prohibited by the Allies from assisting ethnic Germans with food supplies, but in early 1946 this prohibition was rescinded (see CRALOG). In the spring of 1946, the International Red Cross was also finally allowed to visit and provide limited amounts of food aid to prisoners of war in the US occupation zone. (see Disarmed Enemy Forces)....

== Japan ==
The first point in the US directive for the supply of food for civilian relief in Japan as adopted in the fall of 1945 and reconfirmed in 1946 read as follows:

"a. The objectives of the relief policy of the United States are to prevent such starvation and widespread disease and civil unrest as would (1) clearly endanger the occupying forces, and (2) permanently obstruct the ultimate objectives of the occupation."

To prevent "hunger and social unrest"; in fiscal year 1946 GARIOA grants to Japan were $92.63 million, in 1947 $287.33 million, in 1948 $351.40 million. In Western Europe the Marshall plan from 1948 onwards contributed to a reconstruction of the economies. In order to further remove Japan as a potential future military threat after World War II the Far Eastern Commission had decided that Japan was to be partly de-industrialized. The necessary dismantling of Japanese industry was foreseen to have been achieved when Japanese standards of living had been reduced to those existing in Japan the period 1930–1934. In the end the adopted program of de-industrialisation in Japan was implemented to a lesser degree than the similar US "industrial disarmament" program in Germany. In view of the cost to American taxpayers for the emergency aid, in April 1948 the Johnston Committee Report recommended that the economy of Japan should be reconstructed. The report included suggestions for reductions in war reparations, and a relaxation of the "economic deconcentration" policy. For the fiscal year of 1949 funds were moved from the GARIOA budget into an Economic Rehabilitation in Occupied Areas (EROA) programme, to be used for the import of materials needed for economic reconstruction.

Volunteer organizations created Licensed Agencies for Relief in Asia (LARA) to coordinate their efforts and have a single point of contact with the military authorities which had refused to deal with them on a one-to-one basis. LARA was operational 1946–1952 and sent many tonnes of food and clothing to Japan.

== See also ==
- American food policy in occupied Germany
- United Nations Relief and Rehabilitation Administration
- CARE
