= Far Eastern Commission =

World War 2 commission

The Far Eastern Commission (FEC) was an Allied commission which supervised the occupation of Japan following its defeat in World War II. It succeeded the Far Eastern Advisory Commission (FEAC).

Based in Washington, D.C., it was first agreed on at the Moscow Conference of Foreign Ministers, and made public in a communiqué issued at the end of the conference on December 27, 1945. The nine members that comprised the commission were the United States, United Kingdom, Republic of China, France, the Netherlands, Australia, New Zealand, India and the Philippines. As agreed in the communiqué, the FEC and the Council were dismantled following the Japanese Peace Treaty of September 8, 1951.

The United States was given the dominant position on the Tokyo-based Allied Council for Japan, a concession the Republic of China was willing to accept due to the underlying influence of the informal 1944 percentages agreement. The Republic of China complied with a Western dominated post-war Japan, alike to the attitude of the United States towards the Soviet dominated spheres of influence in post-war Eastern Europe.

== Background ==
Following the surrender of the Japanese Empire in August 1945, the US government began making preparations for the occupation of Japan as set in Potsdam Declaration. Friction evolved between the US government and other Allied governments, which were dissatisfied with US dominant position in Japan. In order to give other Allied governments token representation in the occupation of Japan, the US government on August 21, 1945 submitted a proposal for the establishing of the "Far Eastern Advisory Commission" to the governments of the Soviet Union, UK and China. The proposal provided for the council to consist of representatives of those countries whose governments join the agreement. According to that proposal, the powers of the commission were to make policy recommendations to the US government in enforcing the provisions of the instrument of surrender. Agreement about the formation of the commission was reached at the London Conference of Foreign Ministers (September 11 to October 2, 1945), as US Secretary of State James Byrnes and British Foreign Minister Ernest Bevin agreed to establish the commission along the lines of the US proposal made on August 21, for the purpose of preparing plans for an Allied Council for Japan. Byrnes emphasized this name change after the 1945 Moscow Conference: "As early as August 5 we invited the Soviet Union, Great Britain, and China to join with us in carrying out the objectives of the Potsdam Declaration and the Terms of Surrender for Japan. The Far Eastern Advisory Commission was established in October, but Great Britain had reservations regarding its advisory character, and the Soviet Union requested a decision regarding control machinery in Tokyo before joining the work of the Commission". The renaming of the FEAC to FEC reflected the tensions between the three major Allied powers during the last stages of the war that would soon come to head, not only in the Cold War between the USSR and US, but also the Suez Crisis between the UK and the US.

The Far Eastern Commission formulated policies for Japan to fulfill under the terms of surrender. It consisted of 10 members who conducted decisions based on majority vote; however, the US, UK, USSR, and Republic of China were awarded veto power over the other members' votes. Between 6 July, 1947 and 20 December 1948, the FEC enacted 13 policy decisions which fell into three categories: disarmament; democratization; and economic recovery.

== Disarmament ==
In order to further neutralize Japan as a potential threat to the US, the Far Eastern Commission decided to partly de-industrialize post-war Japan. Japanese military and industrial disarmament was deemed to be complete after the scale of Japanese industry had been reduced to the levels of 1930–1934. (see Great Depression)
