= Frieda Nadig =

German politician

Frieda Nadig in 1948 or 1949 during her time at the Parlamentarischer Rat. Photo by Erna Wagner-Hehmke (1905-1992)

Friederike Nadig (11 December 1897 – 14 August 1970) was a German politician of the Social Democratic Party (SPD). One of the four women members of the Parlamentarischer Rat who drafted the Basic Law for the Federal Republic of Germany in 1948/49, she was one of the Mothers of the Basic Law.

== Life ==
Friederike Charlotte Louise Nadig was born in Herford on 11 December 1897. Her father Wilhelm Nadig, a joiner, was a SPD politician who served in the Landtag of Prussia from 1919 to 1931. Her mother Luise Henriette Friederike Drewes was a seamstress. After being educated at a Bürgerschule, Nadig completed vocational training as a sales clerk at the Konsumverein Herford co-operative and worked as saleswoman from 1914 to 1920. From 1920 to 1922 she studied at the Social Women's School of Alice Salomon in Berlin, where she qualified as a social worker. From 1922, she was a youth social worker in the city of Bielefeld social office and volunteered in the Arbeiterwohlfahrt (Worker's Welfare), a social aid organisation. In May 1933, Nadig was summarily dismissed from her job for "unreliability" based on her "Marxist attitude" and the Nazi Law for the Restoration of the Professional Civil Service. After three years of unemployment and difficulties caused by the political reasons for her dismissal, she found a position at the public health office of Ahrweiler in early 1936 and stayed there until the end of the war, using her influence to protect people against Nazi euthanasia laws.

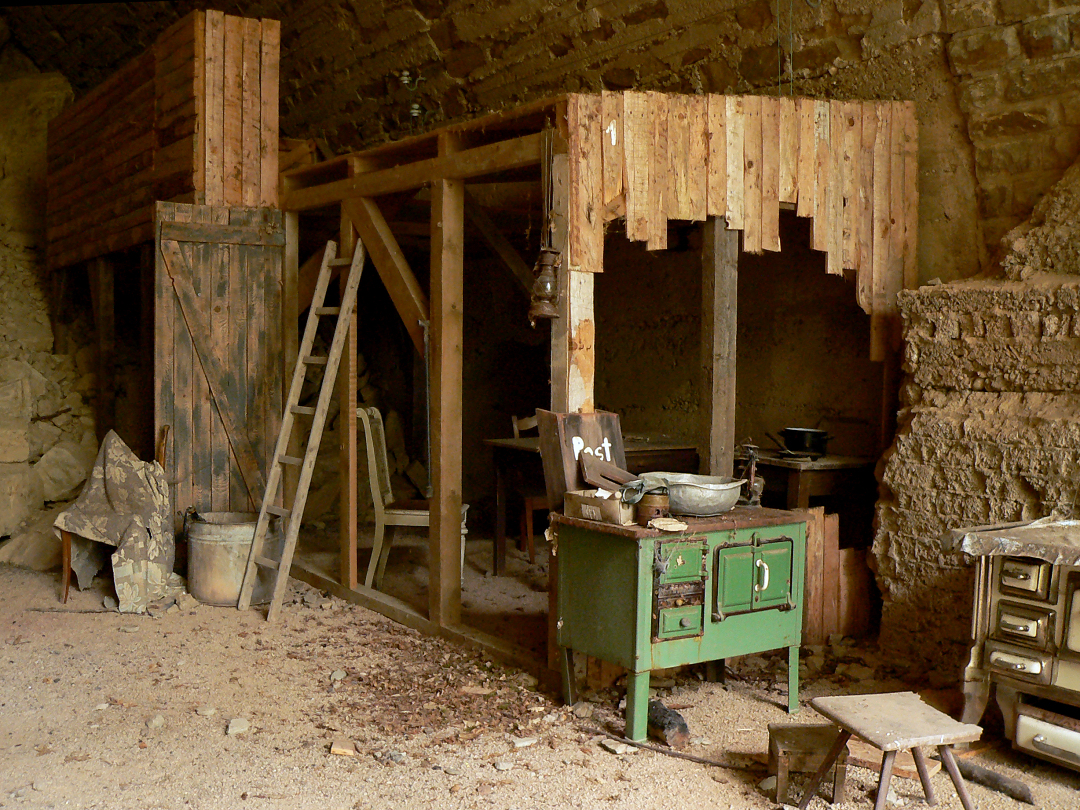
Reconstructed shelter in the Silberbergtunnel

In 1944/45, she was among those 2500 Ahrweiler residents who temporarily lived in the Silberbergtunnel, a tunnel (part of the never-finished Strategic Railway Embankment) in a nearby mountain that was used as shelter from Allied bomb attacks. In 1946, after a query by Nadig, the city of Bielefeld annulled her 1933 dismissal, but Nadig took a salaried position at the Arbeiterwohlfahrt Westfalen-Ost instead, where she was involved in the creation of retirement homes and childcare facilities. She retired from the Arbeiterwohlfahrt in 1966, as managing director of the regional office. Nadig died in Bad Oeynhausen on 14 August 1970.

== Political career ==
Nadig became a member of the Arbeiterjugend (worker's youth) in 1914 and joined the SPD in 1916. After gaining reputation as an expert for youth and women's issues within the regional SPD, she was elected a member of the provincial diet of Westphalia in 1929 and again in 1933, shortly before the provincial diet was dissolved. In the Nazi era, she was not allowed to be active politically.

After the end of the war, Nadig helped rebuild the SPD in Bielefeld and in Ostwestfalen. In 1947, she became a member of the British Occupation Zone's Zonal Advisory Council and was later elected member of the Landtag of North Rhine-Westphalia, serving from 20 April 1947 to 17 June 1950. In 1948, she was sent to the Parlamentarischer Rat in Bonn as a representative of North Rhine-Westphalia.

Nadig was a member of the Bundestag from 1949 to 1961, winning election as first-past-the post candidate three times, in the constituencies of Bielefeld-Stadt and Bielefeld-Halle. Her main political work was on women's equality in marriage and family law.

== Influence on the Parliamentary Council ==
Nadig was one of only four women members of the Parliamentary Council, the four "Mothers of the Basic Law". She was one of 12 members of the Grundsatzausschuss, the committee responsible for foundational principles. She and Elisabeth Selbert were instrumental in having equal rights for women included in the Basic Law, and it was Nadig who proposed the SPD amendment motion to include the sentence "men and women have equal rights" in the committee session on 30 November 1948. It was rejected by the committee on that day and by the Hauptausschuss, the coordinating committee, on 3 December 1948. Selbert and Nadig organised a wide-ranging protest of women across German society, and a large number of letters and resolutions by women and women's organisations reached the Parliamentary Council. The coordinating committee then passed the equal rights amendment unanimously on 18 January 1949. Nadig attempted to explicitly include the right to equal pay, but the coordinating committee decided this was already implicit in the equal rights statement, however, this turned out not to be the case in practice.

Nadig also attempted to guarantee equal rights for children born out of wedlock and worked to secure the right for conscientious objection in the Basic Law.
