= Herrenchiemsee convention =

Meeting of constitutional experts

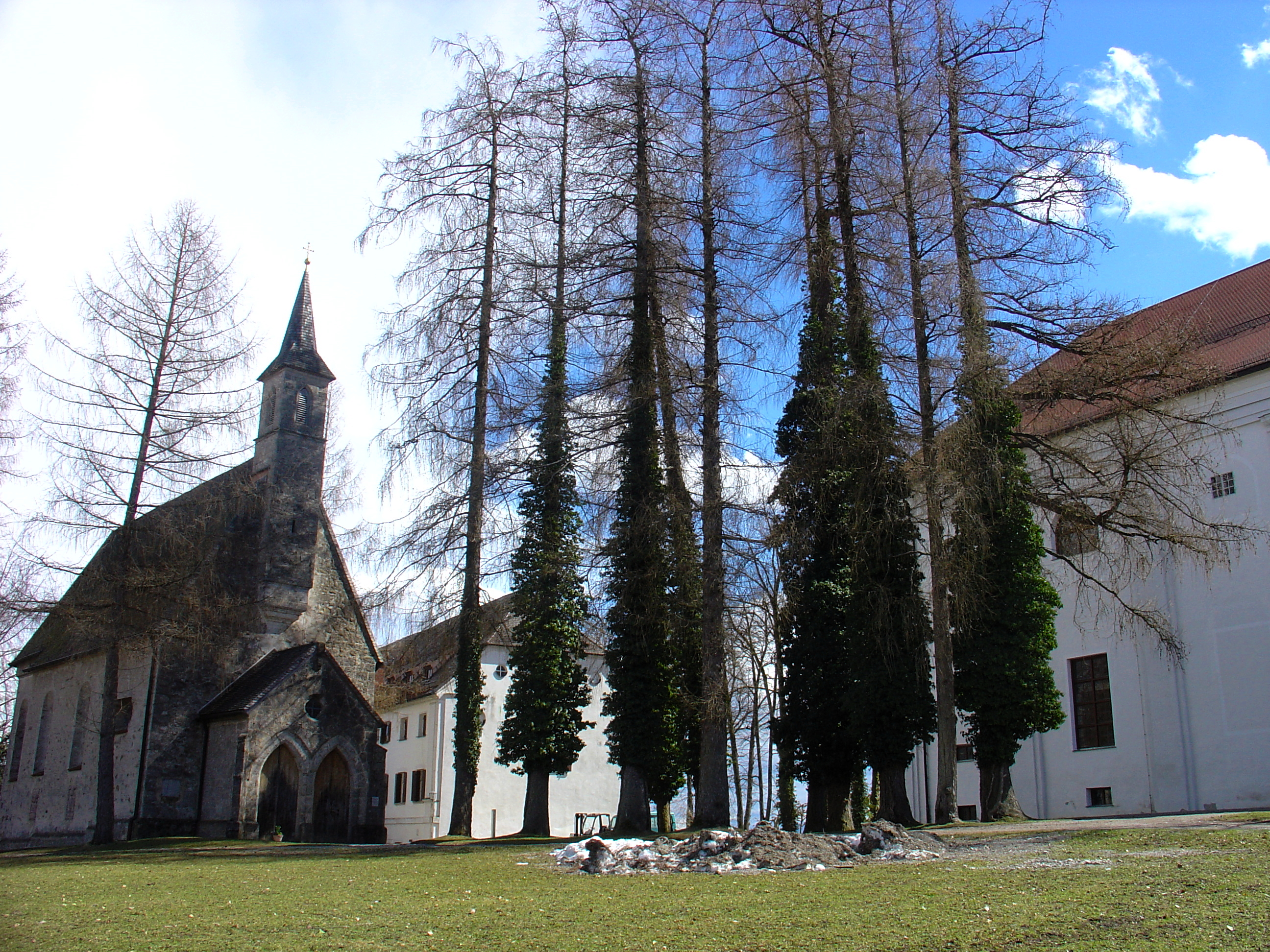
Herrenchiemsee Abbey

The Constitutional Convention at Herrenchiemsee (German: Verfassungskonvent auf Herrenchiemsee) was a meeting of constitutional experts nominated by the minister-presidents of the Western States of Germany, held in August 1948 at former Herrenchiemsee Abbey in Bavaria. It was part of the process of drafting and adopting the current German constitution, the Basic Law (Grundgesetz). The draft document prepared by the Herrenchiemsee convention served as a starting point for the deliberations of the Parlamentarischer Rat in Bonn during 1948 and 1949.

== Proceedings ==
On 1 July 1948, the Western Allies had officially recommended the implementation of a West German state by handing out the Frankfurt Documents to the minister-presidents and governing mayors of the Western occupation zones. From 8 to 10 July, the minister-presidents met at Koblenz and proclaimed the establishment of a Federal Republic of Germany, which should only be a provisional arrangement but not a successor state of the German Reich.

Chaired by the representative of the Bavarian State Chancellery, the convention was inaugurated on 10 August at the Herrenchiemsee "Old Palace", a former residence of King Ludwig II. The assembly did not adopt an official name, but it was later called Herrenchiemsee Convention by the members of the Parlamentarischer Rat. Every West German state was represented by an expert, and the West Berlin deputy Otto Suhr, because of Allied reservations, attended the meeting as a non-voting "guest". Three committees were established, which until 23 August drafted a nearly-complete concept of a new German constitution that fixed the basic principles of the Basic Law:

- A bicameral system of a directly-elected federal parliament (the Bundestag) and a representation of the German states. No agreement was reached on the configuration of the second chamber; instead of a genuine Senate "upper house", the Bundesrat legislative body was implemented in 1949.
- The Cabinet of Germany as the federal executive body is dependent on a majority in the parliament if it can fulfil the task of forming a government. The confidence of the parliament is essential but also sufficient for the head of government (the Chancellor).
- A negative majority shall not prevent the formation of the government nor overthrow it without replacing it (see constructive vote of no confidence).
- Beside the head of government is a neutral legitimizing head of state, the President of Germany, with limited executive powers.
- The President is allowed neither to take emergency measures (Notverordnungen as according to Article 48 of the 1919 Weimar Constitution) nor to execute federal laws in the states; those rights are reserved for the German government and the Bundesrat.
- The execution of federal laws is supervised by the federal judicial system.
- The states are mainly responsible for legislation, administration, justice and financing.
- States and federal government prepare and execute separate budgets.
- The instruments of direct democracy on federal level are limited: there is no provision of a country-wide referendum, and plebiscite shall be held only to adopt a new constitution.
- Any constitutional amendment in order to abolish the fundamental principles of human dignity or the republican, democratic and federal form of government is illegal (see eternity clause).

The federal character of the Herrenchiemsee draft corresponded with the assignment of the convention by the German States. It was adopted by a minister-presidents' conference before it was forwarded to the Parlamentarischer Rat. The council in Bonn could rely on a highly-qualified conception with several contentious points resolved in advance, but many Social Democratic and Communist deputies originally objected against the strong exertion of influence by the states' governments.

== See also ==
- Weimar National Assembly of 1919
- Legal status of Germany
