= Parlamentarischer Rat =

West German constituent assembly in Bonn

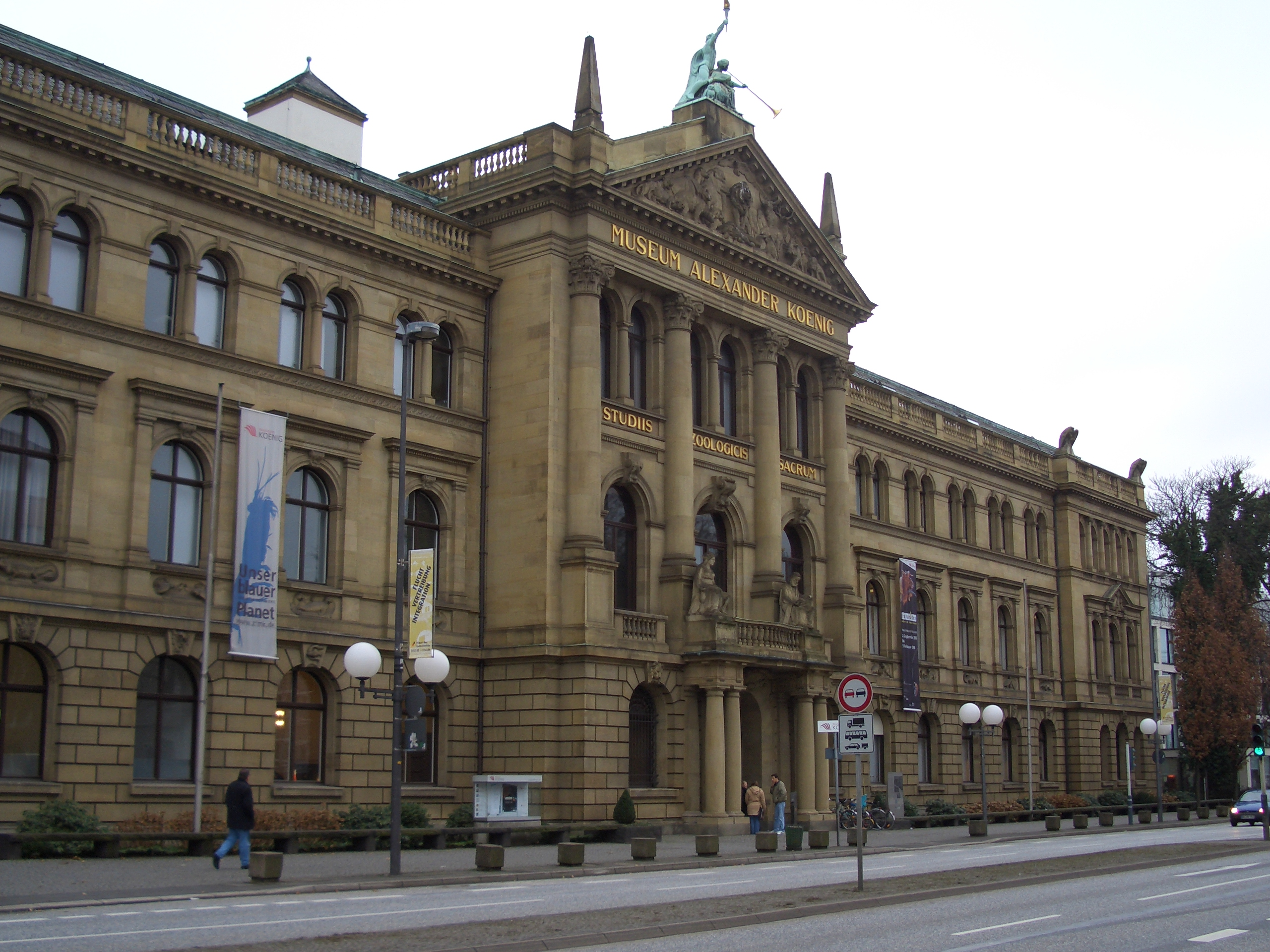
Museum Koenig, Bonn

The Parlamentarischer Rat (German for "Parliamentary Council") was the West German constituent assembly in Bonn that drafted and adopted the constitution of West Germany, the Basic Law for the Federal Republic of Germany, promulgated on 23 May 1949.

== Convening ==
The Council was implemented by the minister-presidents of the eleven states of Germany within the three Western Allied occupation zones and inaugurated on 1 September 1948. It included 70 state delegates selected by the Landtag parliaments specifically for this purpose (including five non-voting representatives of West Berlin), many of them state ministers, government officials or legal academics. The deputies could rely on a draft document prepared by the constitutional Herrenchiemsee convention held in August.

The Council was officially opened by North Rhine-Westphalia minister-president Karl Arnold as host. The second speaker was Hessian minister-president Christian Stock as current head of the Ministerial Conference of the Federal States. The site of the opening ceremony was at the great hall of the Museum Koenig in Bonn, a preliminary decision in view of the "provisional" capital of a West German state, which the minister-presidents at a convention in Düsseldorf on 11 October 1948 decided to locate in Bonn (instead of Frankfurt). The assembly elected the Christian Democratic politician Konrad Adenauer, former mayor of Cologne, its president. The regular sessions of the Parliamentary Council were held at the nearby Pedagogical Academy building.

The delegates of the Christian Democratic Union (CDU) already formed a united faction with their Christian Social (CSU) colleagues from Bavaria, as did the liberal Free Democratic Party (FDP) together with the Hessian Liberal-Democratic Party and the Democratic People's Party (DVP) from Württemberg-Baden and Württemberg-Hohenzollern. The 65 voting members included 27 Christian Democrats, 27 Social Democrats (SPD) led by Carlo Schmid, and five Liberals under Theodor Heuss. In addition, the Communist Party, the German Party and the Centre Party each sent two delegates. Four of the 65 delegates were women: Elisabeth Selbert (SPD), Friederike Nadig (SPD), Helene Weber (CDU) and Helene Wessel (Centre). The SPD deputy Paul Löbe had served as President of the Reichstag parliament from 1925 until 1932, when he was succeeded by Hermann Göring.

== Proceedings ==
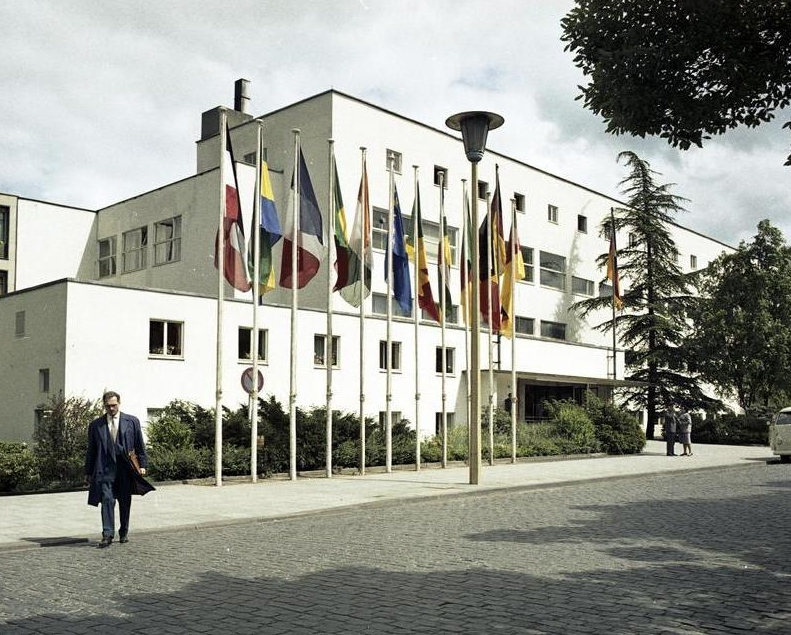
Building of the Pedagogical Academy in Bonn, later the Bundeshaus

The primary purpose of the Council was to prepare a new constitution for Germany, thereby drawing lessons from the failure of the Weimar Republic and the rise of Nazism, in order to re-establish a federal state based upon a stable democracy, welfare and the Rechtsstaat maxim. The draft declared human dignity inviolable, and to respect and protect it the duty of all state authority. These basic principles were explicitly declared irreversible by the so-called eternity clause. To distinguish it, for instance, from the newly established People's Republics behind the Iron Curtain, the draft laid stress on a parliamentary system and references related to notions separation of powers, all bound to the constitution. It included a charter of fundamental rights and the right of access to courts.

The Chancellor as head of government was authorized to draw up the guidelines of policies, while the powers of the President of Germany as head of state were limited. In consequence of the destructive motions in the former Reichstag, the draft implemented the constructive vote of no confidence, whereafter the Chancellor may only be removed from office by the Bundestag parliament if a prospective successor has the support of a majority. The concept of Streitbare Demokratie also included the implementation of the Federal Constitutional Court as a separate judicial body, in accordance with the theories of Hans Kelsen. Its preamble stated the obligation to achieve German unity and the draft also provided for the accession of "other parts of Germany", as it was applied to the joining of the former Saar Protectorate in 1957 and German reunification in 1990. The Western Allies insisted on the special status of Berlin, which is why the Bundestag MPs from West Berlin were not entitled to vote.

The Council adopted the new constitution on 8 May 1949, with 53 votes for and 12 votes against, the Communist, German Party and Centre delegates voted against, as did six out of the eight CSU representatives. It also drafted the Election Law ("Wahlgesetz") for the first Bundestag election of 1949 (which was later on replaced by the "Bundeswahlgesetz"). The draft was approved by the three Western Supreme Commanders on May 12, as did the state assemblies—except for the Bavarian Landtag for an assumed insufficient realization of the federalism principle, knowing that the consent of two thirds of the state parliaments were enough for the enactment. The Basic Law was then formally signed and promulgated on May 23. The Parliamentary Council disassembled once it had finished its purpose, i.e. after the ratification and the enactment of the first Election Law in preparation of the 1949 federal election, which among others the Basic Law had left it as a remaining task.

== See also ==
- Post-World War II Constituent Assembly of Italy
- Politics of Germany
- Weimar National Assembly of 1919

== Sources ==
- Josef Becker/ Theo Stammen/ Peter Waldmann (eds.): Vorgeschichte der Bundesrepublik Deutschland. München: UTB Wilhelm Fink Verlag, 1979.
- Frank R. Pfetsch et al.: Ursprünge der Zweiten Republik. Opladen: Westdeutscher Verlag, 1990.
- BMFSJ, ed. (2019). Mütter des Grundgesetzes (in German) (13th ed.). Berlin: Bundesministerium für Familie, Senioren, Frauen und Jugend, Referat Öffentlichkeitsarbeit.
- Feldkamp, Michael F. (2019-04-15). Der Parlamentarische Rat 1948–1949: Die Entstehung des Grundgesetzes (in German). Vandenhoeck & Ruprecht. ISBN 978-3-647-10565-9.
- Grau, Andreas; Lepper-Binnewerg, Antoinette; Würz, Markus. "LeMO Kapitel: Entstehung der Bundesrepublik: Parlamentarischer Rat und Grundgesetz". hdg.de (in German). Stiftung Deutsches Historisches Museum, Stiftung Haus der Geschichte der Bundesrepublik.
