= Frankfurt Documents =

Series of documents

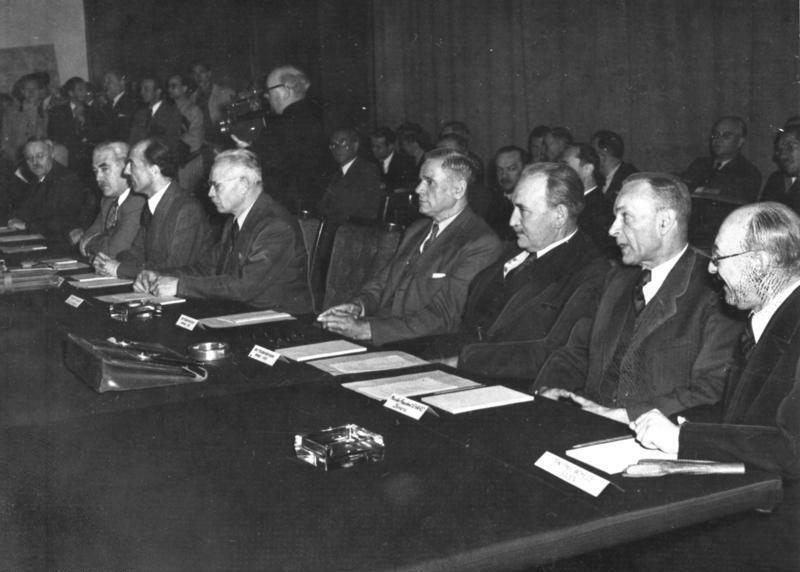
Members of the conference in the I.G.-Farben Building in Frankfurt am Main

The Frankfurt Documents (original: Frankfurter Dokumente) were an important formal step towards the founding of the Federal Republic of Germany at the I.G.-Farben-Building in Frankfurt am Main.

On July 1, 1948 the representatives of the Western allied occupation forces handed over a number of documents to the prime ministers and the two ruling mayors of the western zones of occupation. The Frankfurt Documents contained recommendations for establishing a West German state. The main problem with the recommendations was that they did not provide an all-German solution but only a West German state. The Frankfurt Documents formed a working basis for the Basic Law for the Federal Republic of Germany. They were created at the London 6-Power Conference, which took place between February and June 1948.

The handover took place at the IG Farben Building in Frankfurt am Main, and the documents took the name of the city. The building is now located on the Campus Westend of Goethe University.The military governors Lucius D. Clay (United States), Marie-Pierre Koenig (France) and Brian Hubert Robertson (UK) issued an order establishing a western German state. Present were Peter Altmeier (Rhineland-Palatinate), Karl Arnold (North Rhine-Westphalia), Lorenz Bock (Württemberg-Hohenzollern), Max Brauer (Hamburg), Hans Ehard (Bavaria), Wilhelm Kaisen (Bremen), Hinrich Wilhelm Kopf (Lower Saxony), Hermann Lüdemann (Schleswig-Holstein), Reinhold Maier (Württemberg-Baden), Christian Stock (Hessen) and Leo Wohleb (Baden).

A West German state was to be established under the following conditions:

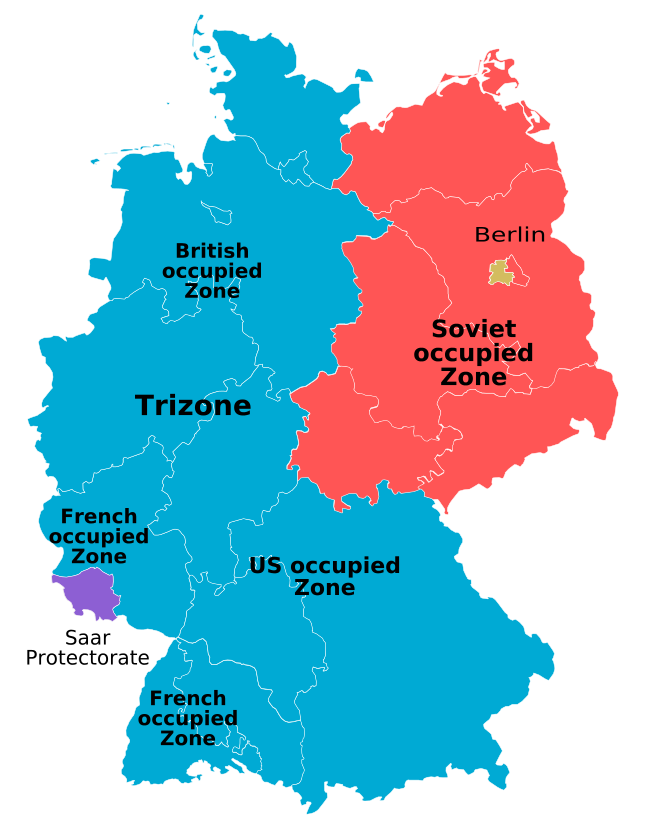
The borders of military occupied Germany.

- There should be a constitutional convention (German: Verfassunggebende Versammlung, literally, "Constituent Assembly") before September 1, 1948, to draft a constitution shaping a federal form of government, while maintaining the rights of people and the participating states.
- The constitution should first be approved by the military governments, followed by a referendum in the states to ratify the Constitution.
- The respective simple majority in two thirds of eleven West German states should be sufficient for ratification.
- Constitutional amendments must be approved by the military governors.
- German foreign policy should continue to be controlled by the military governors, in particular with regards to questions regarding the status of the Ruhr, reparations, industrial policy in general, and the rights of the Allied forces.
- The boundaries of each state should be reviewed and should, if necessary, take into account traditional forms if new states were created. No state should be allowed to be too large or to dominate the others.

The Frankfurt Documents prompted the prime minister to hold the Rittersturz Conference in Koblenz on the resolutions that had been passed.

== See also ==
- Parlamentarischer Rat
