= Basic Law for the Federal Republic of Germany =

Constitution of Germany

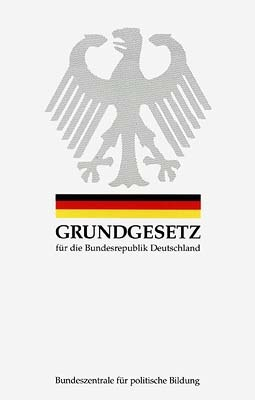
- Basic Law. Published by the Federal Agency for Civic Education

Overview
- Original title: Grundgesetz für die Bundesrepublik Deutschland
- Jurisdiction: Federal Republic of Germany
- Ratified: 8 May 1949
- System: Federal parliamentary republic

Government structure
- Branches: 3
- Head of state: President of Germany
- Chambers: Bundestag; Bundesrat
- Executive: Chancellor
- Judiciary: 6 Supreme federal courts: Federal Constitutional Court; Federal Court of Justice; Federal Administrative Court; Federal Labour Court; Federal Social Court; Federal Finance Court
- Federalism: Yes
- Commissioned by: Herrenchiemsee convention
- Author: Parlamentarischer Rat
- Supersedes: Constitution of the German Reich

Full text
- Basic Law for the Federal Republic of Germany at Wikisource
- Grundgesetz für die Bundesrepublik Deutschland at German Wikisource

The Basic Law for the Federal Republic of Germany (German: Grundgesetz für die Bundesrepublik Deutschland) is the constitution of the Federal Republic of Germany.

The West German constitution was adopted in Bonn on 8 May 1949 and came into effect on 23 May after having been approved by the occupying western Allies of World War II on 12 May. It was termed "Basic Law" (Grundgesetz, pronounced [ˈɡʁʊntɡəˌzɛts]) to indicate that it was a provisional piece of legislation pending the reunification of Germany. However, when reunification took place in 1990, the Basic Law was retained as the definitive constitution of reunified Germany. Its original territory of application (Geltungsbereich)—that is, the states that were initially included in the Federal Republic of Germany—consisted of the three Western Allies' zones of occupation, but at the insistence of the Western Allies, formally excluded West Berlin. In 1990, the Two Plus Four Agreement between the two parts of Germany and all four Allies stipulated the implementation of a number of amendments.

The German word Grundgesetz may be translated as either "Basic Law" or "Fundamental Law". The term Verfassung ("constitution") was avoided as the drafters regarded the Grundgesetz as an interim arrangement for a provisional West German state, expecting that an eventual reunified Germany would adopt a definitive constitution. Article 146 of the Basic Law stipulates that such a constitution must be "freely adopted by the German people". Nevertheless, although the amended Basic Law was approved by all four Allied Powers in 1990 (who thereby relinquished their reserved constitutional rights), it was never submitted to a popular vote, neither in 1949 nor in 1990. However, the Basic Law as passed in 1949 also contained Article 23, which provided for "other parts of Germany" to "join the area of applicability of the Basic Law": this was the provision that was used in the 1990 German reunification from a constitutional standpoint. As the overwhelming consensus thereafter was that the German question was settled, and to reaffirm the renunciation of any residual German claim to land east of Oder and Neiße, Article 23 was repealed as of the day of reunification. An unrelated article on the relationship between Germany and the European Union was instead inserted in its place two years later. As a heritage of the Lesser German solution, neither was unification with Austria aspired for.

In the preamble to the Basic Law, its adoption was declared an act of the "German people", and Article 20 states that "All state authority is derived from the people". These statements embody the constitutional principles that "Germany" is identical with the German people and that the German people act constitutionally as the sovereign of the German state. Where the Basic Law refers to the territory under the jurisdiction of this German state, it refers to it as the "federal territory" (Bundesgebiet), thus avoiding any implication of a constitutionally defined "German national territory".

The authors of the Basic Law sought to ensure that a potential dictator would never again be able to come to power in the country. Although some of the Basic Law is based on the Weimar Republic's constitution, the first article is a protection of human dignity (Menschenwürde) and human rights; they are core values protected by the Basic Law. The principles of democracy, republicanism, social responsibility, federalism and the rule of law are key components of the Basic Law (Article 20). Articles 1 and 20 are protected by what is called the eternity clause (Ewigkeitsklausel), Article 79 (3), which prohibits any amendment or removal of the principles laid down in Articles 1 and 20.

== Fundamental rights ==
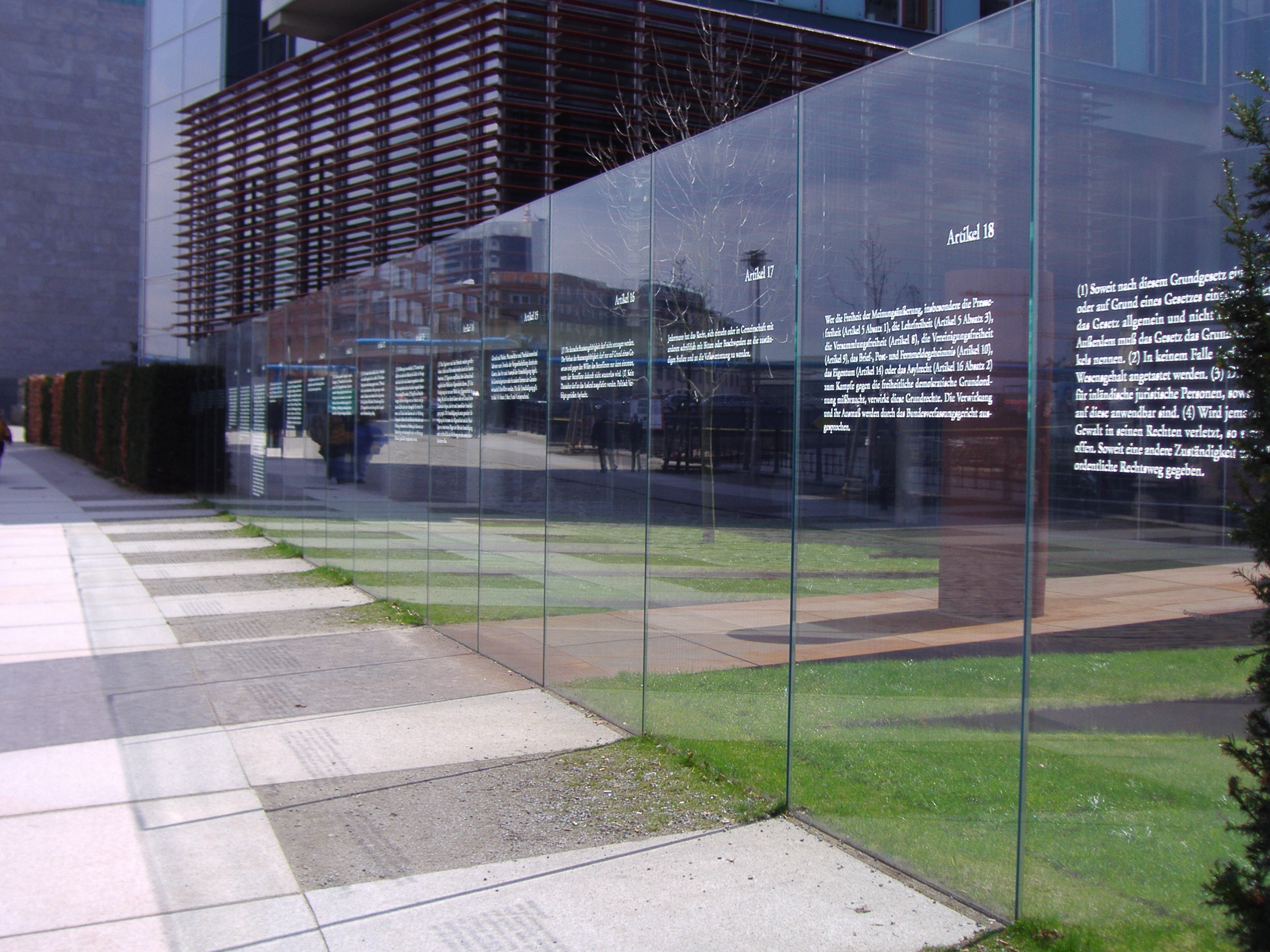
The Grundrechte at Jakob Kaiser House, Berlin

Fundamental rights (Grundrechte) are guaranteed in Germany by the Federal Constitution and in some state constitutions. In the Basic Law, most fundamental rights are guaranteed in the first section of the same name (Articles 1 to 19). They are subjective public rights with the constitutional rank which bind all institutions and functions of the state. In cases where a federal or state law or public ordinance is alleged to be in violation of these fundamental rights, the Basic Law provides the constitutional complaint with an appeal to the Federal Constitutional Court (Article 93 paragraph 1 No. 4a). Article 1 of these fundamental rights, which states that human dignity shall be inviolable and all state authority shall respect and protect it, cannot be changed or removed. The same is true of Article 20, which enshrines fundamental principles of the state—for example, that Germany is a state of law and a democracy. Laws which limit these basic rights are in no case allowed to affect the essence of these rights (Article 19 paragraph 2). Some people think every basic right cannot be changed or removed. However, that is a misconception as other fundamental rights are not protected by Article 79 paragraph 3 (Eternity Clause).

According to this regulation the Federal Constitutional Court can be called not only because of a violation of fundamental rights, but also by violation "of the rights set out in Article 20 paragraph 4 and Articles 33, 38, 101, 103 and 104". Hence, these rights are called the rights identical to fundamental rights.

== Extensions of the field of application by Article 23 ==
The 1949 Basic Law was explicitly irredentist, maintaining that there remained separated parts of 'Germany as a whole' in the form of German peoples living outside the territory under the control of the Federal Republic of 1949, with whom the Federal Republic was constitutionally bound to pursue reunification, and in respect of whom mechanisms were provided by which such other parts of Germany might subsequently declare their accession to the Basic Law. Since initially the Basic Law did not apply for all of Germany, its legal provisions were only valid in its field of application (Geltungsbereich des Grundgesetzes für die Bundesrepublik Deutschland). This legal term was frequently used in West German legislation when West German laws did not apply to the entirety of German territory, as was usually the case.

Article 23 of the Basic Law provided other de jure German states, initially not included in the field of application of the Basic Law, with the right to declare their accession (Beitritt) at a later date. Therefore, although the Basic Law was considered provisional, it allowed more parts of Germany to join its field of application. On one side, it gave the Federal Republic of Germany—composed as it was in 1949—no right to negotiate, reject or deny another German state's declaration of its accession to the FRG, subject to the FRG's recognising that state de jure and being satisfied that the declaration of accession resulted from the free self-determination of its people; while on the other side an acceding state would have to accept the Basic Law and all laws so far legislated under the institutions of the FRG as they were. As the Federal Republic could not itself declare the accession of another part of Germany under Article 23, this provision could not be applied as an instrument of annexation, nor could accession under Article 23 be achieved by international treaty with third party states, although the Federal Constitutional Court recognised that a future declared accession could be framed de facto as a compact between the Federal Republic and the acceding state. It remained unclear whether accession under Article 23 could be achieved by a part of Germany whose government was not recognised de jure by the Federal Republic, and if so how; but in practice this situation did not arise. Article 23, altered after 1990, originally read as follows:

German	English
Dieses Grundgesetz gilt zunächst im Gebiete der Länder Baden, Bayern, Bremen, Groß-Berlin, Hamburg, Hessen, Niedersachsen, Nordrhein-Westfalen, Rheinland-Pfalz, Schleswig-Holstein, Württemberg-Baden und Württemberg-Hohenzollern. In anderen Teilen Deutschlands ist es nach deren Beitritt in Kraft zu setzen.	For the time being, this Basic Law shall apply in the territory of the Länder of Baden, Bavaria, Bremen, Greater Berlin, (Note: The Western Allies denied West Berlin being included in the field of application, let alone East Berlin, whose rulers clearly rejected this idea.) Hamburg, Hesse, Lower Saxony, North Rhine-Westphalia, Rhineland-Palatinate, Schleswig-Holstein, Württemberg-Baden, and Württemberg-Hohenzollern. (Note: These states formed the initial Geltungsbereich (field of application) of the Basic Law.) In other parts of Germany it shall be put into force on their accession.

Whereas the West German state had gained restricted sovereignty in May 1955, the Saarlanders rejected in a referendum (1955) the transformation of their protectorate into an independent state within the emerging European Economic Community. The Saar Treaty then opened the way for the government of the Saar Protectorate to declare its accession to the West German state under Article 23, including the new Saarland into the field of application of the Basic Law. The Saar held no separate referendum on its accession. With effect from 1 January 1957 the Federal Republic regarded itself as including almost all of Western Germany such that the only "other parts of Germany" to which Article 23 might be extended were now to the east, hence relinquishing all claims to those western parts of the former German Reich that had been surrendered to France and Denmark. (cf. Little Reunification with the Saar). The towns of Elten, Selfkant, and Suderwick, which had been occupied and annexed by Netherlands in 1949, were reunited with the Federal Republic in 1963 by means of an international treaty without invoking Article 23.

The Basic Law, in its original form, maintained the continuing existence of a larger Germany and German people, only parts of whom were currently organised within the Federal Republic. Nevertheless, the full extent of the implied wider German nation is nowhere defined in the Basic Law, although it was always clearly understood that the peoples of both East Germany and Berlin would be included. In its judgement of 1973, confirming the constitutional validity of the Basic Treaty between East Germany and West Germany, the Federal Constitutional Court justified the recognition of East Germany as a valid German state, on the basis that this would enable the GDR in the future to declare accession to the Basic Law under Article 23. But the Court then explicitly acknowledged that this limited de jure recognition of the GDR also implied acceptance of the constitutional power of the GDR in the interim to enter into international treaties on its own account, naming specifically the treaty with Poland which confirmed the transfer of the "Eastern Territories" to Polish sovereignty.

The Communist regime in East Germany fell in 1990. Following free elections the parliament of the GDR (East Germany) declared the accession of the GDR according to Article 23 to the Federal Republic of Germany to come into effect on 3 October 1990, making unification an act unilaterally initiated by the last East German parliament. East Germany's "declaration of accession" (Beitrittserklärung) envisaged states within East Germany being included into the field of application of the Basic Law, but subject to the Basic Law first being amended in accordance with both the previously negotiated Unification Treaty between East and West Germany, and also the Two-Plus-Four Treaty, under which the Allied Powers had relinquished their residual German sovereignty. So, on the date of accession of East Germany to the Federal Republic of Germany Article 23 was repealed, representing an explicit commitment under Two-Plus-Four Treaty that, following the unification of East Germany, West Germany and Berlin, no "other parts of Germany" remained in east or west to which the Berlin Republic might validly be extended. Rather than adopting a new constitution under Article 146 of the Basic Law, the Bundestag (Parliament of Germany) amended Article 146 and the Preamble of the Basic Law to state that German unification had now been fully achieved, while also adding a further clause 143(3) to entrench in the Basic Law the irreversibility of acts of expropriation undertaken by the Soviet occupying powers between 1945 and 1949. Hence when the GDR's nominal accession to the Federal Republic under Article 23 came into effect on 3 October 1990, Article 23 was no longer in place. Strictly therefore, German reunification was effected by the Unification Treaty between two sovereign states, the GDR and the Federal Republic, and not by the GDR's prior declaration of accession under Article 23, although the former Article 23 was agreed by both parties to the Treaty as setting the constitutional model by which unification would be achieved.

As part of the process, East Germany, which had been a unitary state since 1952, was re-divided into its initial five partially self-governing states (Bundesländer), being granted equal status as the already existing Länder, with East and West Berlin reuniting into a new city-state (like Bremen and Hamburg). After the changes of the Basic Law, mostly pertaining to the accession in 1990, additional major modifications were made in 1994 (Verfassungsreform), 2002 and 2006 (Föderalismusreform).

== Drafting process ==
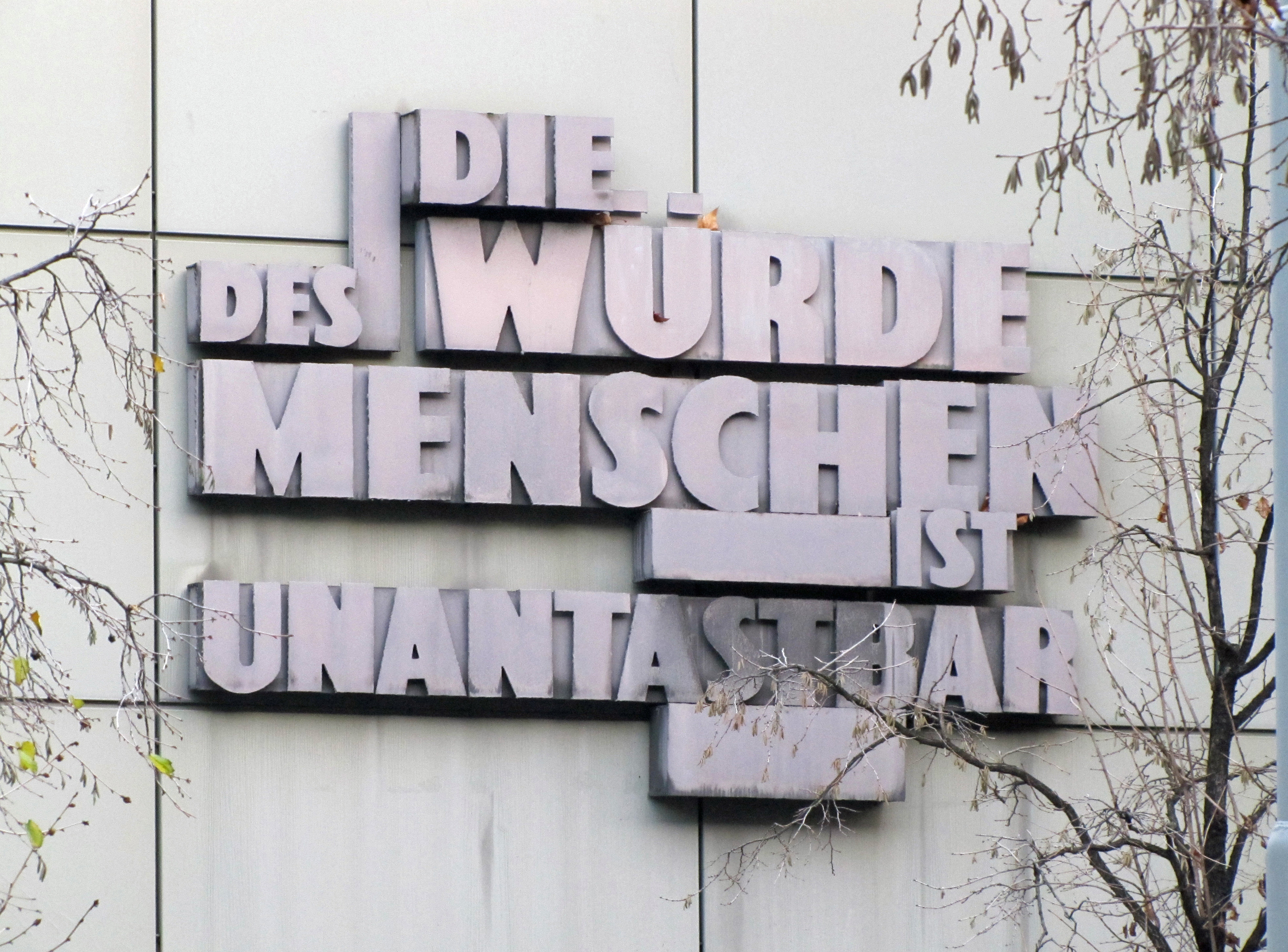
Article 1, sentence 1: "Human dignity shall be inviolable"

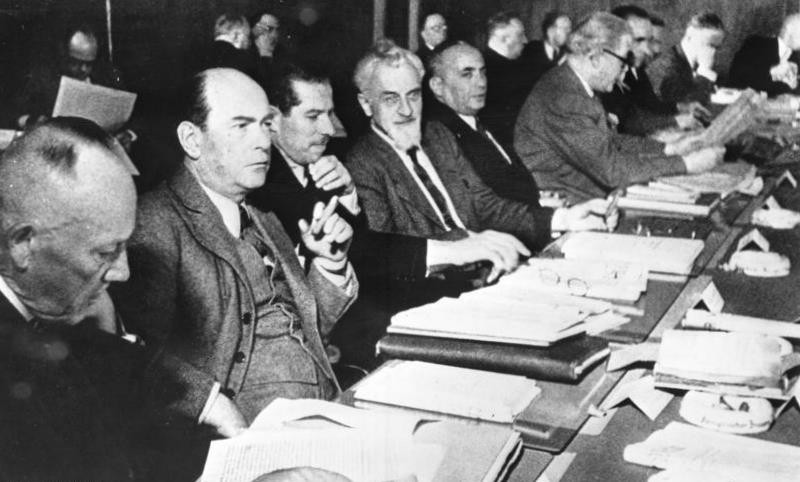
The West German minister-presidents debating the Frankfurt Documents in Koblenz

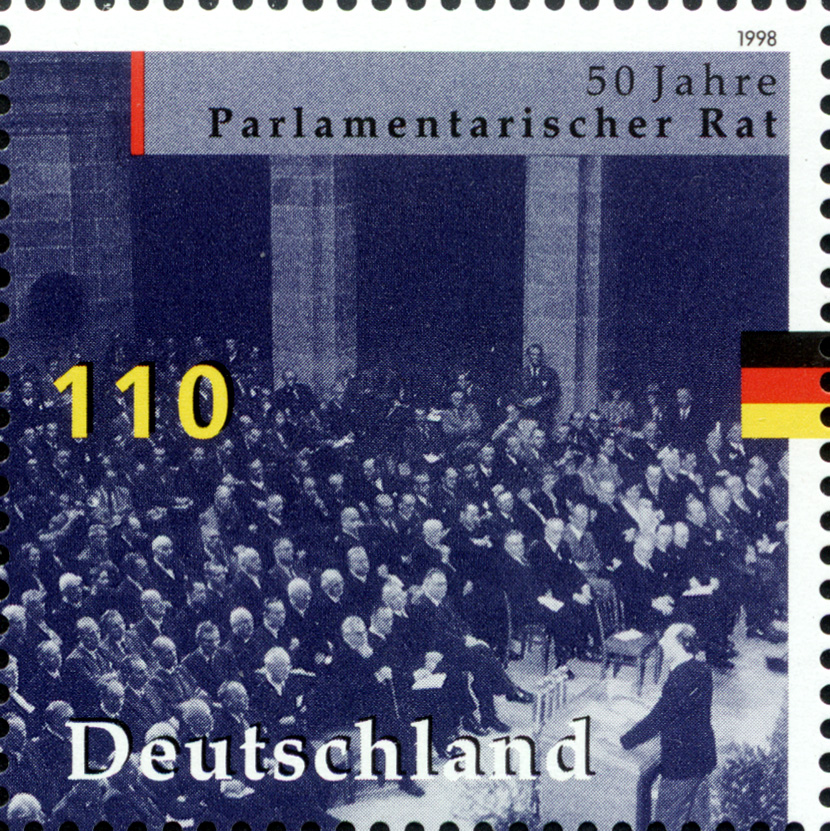
German stamp commemorating the work of the Parlamentarischer Rat

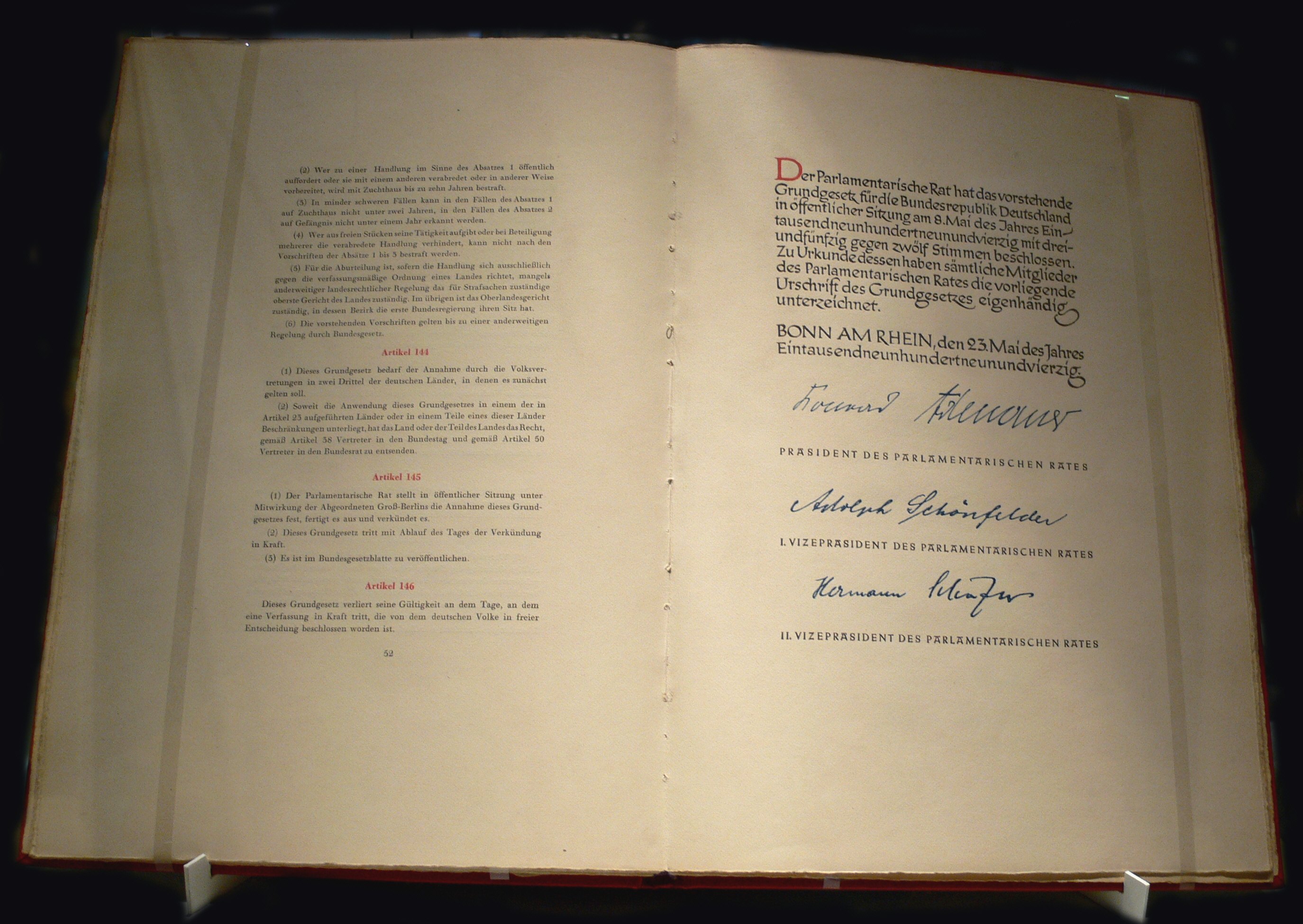
Facsimile of the Basic Law of 1949 as received by each member of the Parliamentary Council

We must be sure that what we construct will some day be a good house for all Germans.

— Karl Arnold speaking about the objective of the West German Basic Law at the Koenig Museum, 1948

Between February and June 1948, the London Six-Power Conference of the three western occupying powers (US, United Kingdom, France) and the three Western neighbours of Germany (Netherlands, Belgium, Luxembourg) was debating the political future of the three western occupation zones of Germany. The negotiations ended with the conclusion that a democratic and federal West German state was to be established.

As an immediate consequence of the London Six-Power Conference, the representatives of the three western occupation powers on 1 July 1948, convoked the Ministerpräsidenten (minister-presidents) of the West German Länder in Frankfurt am Main and committed to them the so-called Frankfurt Documents (Frankfurter Dokumente). The handover took place in the I.G. Farben building on the Campus Westend of today's Goethe University. These papers—amongst other points—summoned the Ministerpräsidenten to arrange a constitutional assembly, that should work out a democratic and federal constitution for a West German state. According to Frankfurt Document No 1, the constitution should specify a central power of German government, but nevertheless respect the administration of the Länder and it should contain provisions and guarantees of individual freedom and individual rights of the German people in respect to their government. With the specific request of a federal structure of a future German state the Western Powers followed German constitutional tradition since the foundation of the Reich in 1871.

The Ministerpräsidenten were reluctant to fulfill what was expected from them, as they anticipated that the formal foundation of a West German state would mean a permanent disruption of German unity. A few days later they convened a conference of their own on Rittersturz ridge near Koblenz. They decided that any of the Frankfurt requirements should only be implemented in a formally provisional way. So the constitutional assembly was to be called Parlamentarischer Rat (lit. parliamentary council) and the constitution given the name of Basic Law instead of calling it a "constitution". By these provisions they made clear, that any West German state was not a definite state for the German people, and that future German self-determination and the reunification of Germany was still on their agenda. The Ministerpräsidenten prevailed and the Western Powers gave in concerning this highly symbolic question.

The draft was prepared at the preliminary Herrenchiemsee convention (10–23 August 1948) on the Herreninsel in the Chiemsee, a lake in southeastern Bavaria. The delegates at the convention were appointed by the leaders of the newly formed (or newly reconstituted) Länder (states).

On 1 September 1948 the Parlamentarischer Rat assembled and began working on the exact wording of the Basic Law. The 65 members of the Parlamentarischer Rat were elected by the parliaments of the German Länder with one deputy representing about 750,000 people. After being passed by the Parliamentary Council assembled at the Museum Koenig in Bonn on 8 May 1949—the museum was the only intact building in Bonn large enough to house the assembly—and after being approved by the occupying powers on 12 May 1949, it was ratified by the parliaments of all the Trizonal Länder with the exception of Bavaria. (Note: The others were Bremen, Hamburg, Hesse, Lower Saxony, North Rhine-Westphalia, Rhineland-Palatinate, Schleswig-Holstein, Württemberg-Baden, and Württemberg-Hohenzollern. The Stadtverordnetenversammlung von Berlin, then only competent in West Berlin, had voted for the Basic Law, but the Western Allies denied West Berlin, as part of quadripartite Berlin, being included in the field of application of the Basic Law.) The Landtag of Bavaria rejected the Basic Law mainly because it was seen as not granting sufficient powers to the individual Länder, but at the same time decided that it would still come into force in Bavaria if two-thirds of the other Länder ratified it. On 23 May 1949, in a solemn session of the Parliamentary Council, the German Basic Law was signed and promulgated. The time of legal nonentity ended, as the new West German state, the Federal Republic of Germany, came into being, although still under Western occupation.

== Important differences from the Weimar Constitution ==
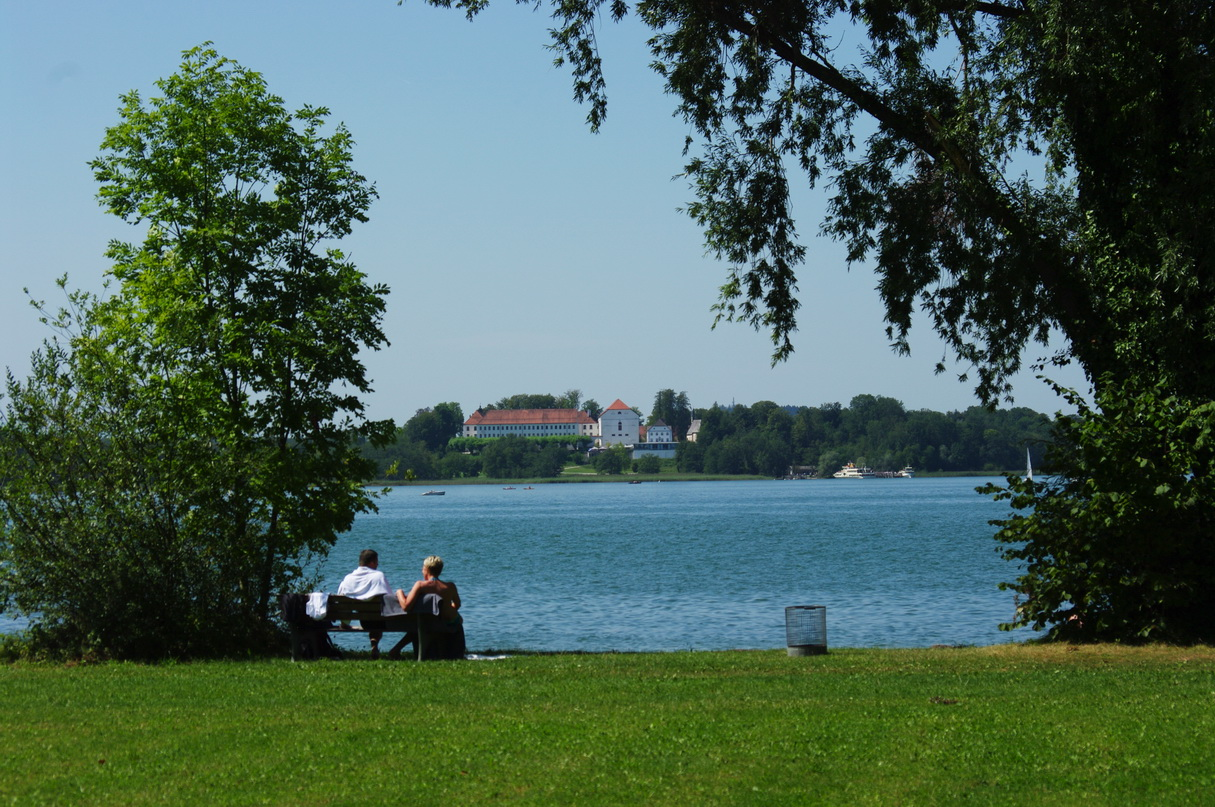
The Constitutional Convention at Herrenchiemsee drew up the draft for the Basic Law in summer 1948 at the Herrenchiemsee Abbey on the secluded Herreninsel (Isle of Lords) (Note: Explanation of the German meaning of 'Herr'. The "Herren" in question were "Augustiner Chorherren", Canons Regular, which ruled the region in former times.) in the Bavarian lake of Chiemsee while shielded from the public. The basic law formed the central part of the constitution of Allied-occupied Germany and subsequently reunified Germany.

Basic rights are fundamental to the Basic Law, in contrast to the Weimar Constitution, which listed them merely as "state objectives". Pursuant to the mandate to respect human dignity, all state power is directly bound to guarantee these basic rights. Article 1 of the Basic Law, which establishes this principle that "human dignity is inviolable" and that human rights are directly applicable law, as well as the general principles of the state in Article 20, which guarantees democracy, republicanism, social responsibility and federalism, remain under the guarantee of perpetuity stated in Article 79 paragraph 3, i.e., the principles underlying these clauses cannot be removed even if the normal amendment process is followed.

There were, in the original version, no emergency powers such as those used by the Reichspräsident in the Reichstag Fire Decree of 1933 to suspend basic rights and to remove communist members of the Reichstag from power, an important step for Hitler's Machtergreifung. The suspension of human rights would also be illegal under Articles 20 and 79, as above. The right to resist is permitted against anyone seeking to abolish constitutional order, if other remedies were to fail under Article 20.

The constitutional position of the federal government was strengthened, as the Bundespräsident has only a small fraction of the former power of the Reichspräsident, and in particular, is no longer in Supreme Command of the armed forces. Indeed, the original text of the Basic Law of 1949 made no provision for federal armed forces; only in 1955 was the Basic Law amended with Article 87a to allow the creation of a German military for the Federal Republic. The government now depends only on the parliament; while the military, by contrast with their status in the Weimar Republic, are entirely under parliamentary authority.

To remove the chancellor, the parliament has to engage in a Constructive vote of no confidence (Konstruktives Misstrauensvotum), i.e. the election of a new chancellor. The new procedure was intended to provide more stability than under the Weimar Constitution, when extremists on the left and right would vote to remove a chancellor, without agreeing on a new one, creating a leadership vacuum. In addition it was possible for the parliament to remove individual ministers by a vote of distrust, while it now has to vote against the cabinet as a whole.

Article 32 of the Basic Law allows the states to conduct foreign affairs with states with regards to matters falling within their purview, under supervision of the Federal Government.

Article 24 states that the Federal Government may "transfer sovereign powers to international institutions" and Article 25 states that "general rules of international law shall be an integral part of federal law". The latter article was included in deference to the post-war actions of the occupying Western powers; but had the unintended consequence that the Federal Constitutional Court tended to define "rules of international law" as applicable to German federal law within Germany, that were nevertheless different from the generality of rules and principles of international law as they might operate between Germany and other nations. Hence, the Federal Constitutional Court could recognise East Germany as a sovereign state in international law in the second sense, while still asserting that it was not a "sovereign state in international law" within Germany itself.

== Basic Law and German Sonderweg ==
In seeking to come to terms with Germany's catastrophic recent history, much discussion has focused on the key theory of a German Sonderweg (special way): the proposition that Germany had followed a path to modernity radically different from that of its European neighbours, that had rendered it particularly susceptible to militaristic, anti-humanitarian, totalitarian and genocidal impulses. The theory is much contested, but formed the major context for the original formulation of the Basic Law. The Basic Law sought "to correct the course of Germany's Sonderweg—to reclaim the German State from its special historical path, and to realise in postwar West Germany the Liberal Democratic Republic that had proved unachievable for the Frankfurt patriots of 1848 or the Weimar revolutionaries of 1919." In interpreting it, the Federal Constitutional Court seemed to "have its eye on a Germany that might have been".

In the dominant post-war narrative of West Germany, the Nazi regime was characterised as having been a 'criminal' state, illegal and illegitimate from the outset, while the Weimar Republic was characterised as having been a 'failed' state, whose inherent institutional and constitutional flaws had been exploited by Hitler in his illegal seizure of dictatorial powers. Consequently, following the death of Hitler in 1945 and the subsequent capitulation of the German Armed Forces, the national institutions and constitutional instruments of both Nazi Germany and the Weimar Republic were understood as entirely defunct, such that the Basic Law could be established in a condition of constitutional nullity. Nevertheless, although the Weimar Republic was now wholly irretrievable, avoiding its perceived constitutional weaknesses represented the predominant concern for the framers of the Basic Law.

The experience of the Weimar Republic had resulted in a widespread public perception that the principles of representative democracy and of the rule of law (Rechtsstaat) were inherently in conflict with one another, and the Parliamentary Council drafting the Basic Law were well aware that their militantly pro-democratic ideals were far from generally shared in the bleak context of Germany in 1949. Hence they built into the Basic Law a strong instrument for guardianship of the "free democratic basic order" of the Federal Republic, in the form of the Federal Constitutional Court, representing a 'staggering conferral of judicial authority'. Unlike the United States Supreme Court the Federal Constitutional Court not only has jurisdiction in constitutional matters, but also exclusive jurisdiction in such matters; all other courts must refer constitutional cases to it. The intention of the framers of the Basic Law was that this court would range widely against any tendency to slip back toward non-democratic ways: "a strict but benevolent guardian of an immature democracy that cannot quite trust itself". As such the Federal Constitutional Court had the power to ban political parties whose objectives or actions threatened the 'free democratic basic order'.

The Basic Law places at its head a guarantee of inviolable fundamental rights. Initially it was intended to limit these to classic formulations of civil freedoms, as with equality before the law, freedom of speech, freedom of assembly, freedom of occupation and freedom of religious conscience. In the event particular interests pushed for additional consideration: the Catholic Church (through CDU/CSU representatives) succeeded in inserting protection both for 'Marriage and the Family" and for parental responsibility for children's education, SPD representatives then amended this to protect additionally the rights of children born outside marriage, and Elisabeth Selbert (one of only four women on the 70-strong panel) was eventually successful in a largely lone campaign to gain constitutional protection for sex equality. Notwithstanding this, there was a striking disjunction between the social context of two-parent, family households assumed in the Basic Law, and the everyday reality of German society in 1949, where over half of adult women were unmarried, separated or widowed, where the effective working population was overwhelmingly female, and where millions of expellees, refugees and displaced families were still without permanent accommodation. It was not until 1994 that constitutional protection was extended against discrimination on grounds of disability, while discrimination on grounds of sexual orientation is still not disallowed within the Basic Law.

== Legal status of Germany ==
As adopted by West Germany in 1949 as an interim constitution, the preamble of the Basic Law looked forward explicitly to a future free and united German state: "The entire German people is called upon to accomplish, by free self-determination, the unity and freedom of Germany." This was understood as embedding in the Basic Law both the proposition that Germany in 1949 was neither unified nor free, and also as binding the new Federal Republic to a duty to pursue the creation of such a free and unified Germany "on behalf of those Germans to whom participation was denied". The Basic Law potentially provided two routes for the establishment of a reborn and unified German state: either under Article 23 whereby 'other parts of Germany' over and above the named States of the Federal Republic (Bundesländer) could subsequently declare their accession, or under Article 146 where constituent power (pouvoir constituant) could be exercised by elected representatives of the entirety of the German people in creating a new permanent constitution that would replace the Basic Law. Adoption of a constitution under Article 146 would have implied that the legal validity of a unified German State would rest on "a free decision by the German people" as a whole.

Following the surrender of the German High Command and the dissolution of the Flensburg Government in May 1945, no effective national government of any sort existed in Germany and all national military and civil authority and powers were thereon exercised by the four Allies. The Allies maintained in fact that sovereign authorities wielding state powers no longer existed in the former German Reich; so, as the 'highest authority' for Germany, they were entitled to assume all sovereign powers without limitation of duration or scope, and could legitimately impose whatever measures on the German people within German national territory as any government could legally do on its own people—including validly ceding parts of that territory and people to another country. They argued furthermore that international conventions constraining occupying powers in wartime from enforcing fundamental changes of governmental system, economic system or social institutions within the territory under their control—the Hague Regulations of Land Warfare and the Geneva Conventions—did not apply, and could not apply, as the termination of Nazi Germany and the total Denazification of German institutions and legal structures had been agreed by the Allies as absolute moral imperatives. Consequently, the Potsdam Agreement envisaged that an eventual self-governing state would emerge from the wreckage of WWII covering 'Germany as a whole', but that this new state would have no claim to sovereignty other than as derived from the sovereignty then being assumed by the Allies, and its constitution would also require the approval of all the Allies. From the 1950s onwards, however, a school of German legal scholars developed the alternative view that the Allies had only taken custody of German sovereignty while the former German state had been rendered powerless to act, and that consequently, once a freely constituted German government had come into being in the form of the Federal Republic, it could resume the identity and legal status of the former German Reich without reference to the Allied Powers.

From the 1950s, the claim that there was a single continuing German Reich, and that in some sense the Federal Republic and the Federal Republic alone could represent that Reich, was adopted both by the Federal Government itself and by the Federal Constitutional Court. Initially, the 1949 constitution of the German Democratic Republic adopted a mirror image version of this claim, and went even further than the Basic Law did; while the Basic Law was intended only as a temporary magna carta, the 1949 GDR constitution was meant to serve as an all-German constitution on its own political terms. In 1968, the 1949 constitution was replaced with a new constitution of an explicitly socialist ideological character, which asserted the GDR is the "socialist state of the German nation" and that West Germany was an illegitimate puppet state of the "imperialist" Western Allies. However, with the replacement of Walter Ulbricht by Erich Honecker as the leader of East Germany, the 1968 constitution was amended in 1974 to remove all references to a wider national German nation, and from that date the GDR maintained that from 1949 there had existed two entirely separate sovereign German states. The Federal Republic's Cold-war Allies supported its claims in part, as they acknowledged the Federal Republic as the sole legitimate democratically organised state within former German territory (the GDR being held to be a Soviet puppet state), but they did not accept the associated arguments for the Reich's continuing 'metaphysical' existence de jure within the organs of the Federal Republic alone. Subsequently, under the Ostpolitik, the Federal Republic in the early 1970s sought to end hostile relations with the countries of the Eastern Bloc, in the course of which it negotiated in 1972 a Basic Treaty with the GDR, recognising it as one of two German states within one German nation, and relinquishing any claim to de jure sovereign jurisdiction over East Germany. The Treaty was challenged in the Federal Constitutional court, as apparently contradicting the overriding aspirations of the Basic Law for a unified German state; but the Treaty's legality was upheld by the Court, heavily qualified by a reassertion of the claim that the German Reich continued to exist as an 'overall state' such that the duty to strive for future German unity could not be abandoned while East and West Germany remained disunited, albeit that without any institutional organs of itself the 'overall' Reich was currently not capable of action.

According to the 1973 decision of the Federal Constitutional Court, Article 23 of the Basic Law required the Federal Republic to be "legally open" to the accession of those former parts of Germany who were then organised into the German Democratic Republic, and they noted that this implied that the Federal Republic could recognise the capability of the GDR state, as then constituted, of so declaring its accession. In this sense, the Basic Treaty's recognition of the GDR as a de jure German State and as a valid state in international relations (albeit without then according it within West Germany with the status of a separate sovereign state) could be interpreted as furthering the long-term objective of eventual German unification, rather than as contradicting it. On 23 August 1990 the Volkskammer of the GDR did indeed declare its accession to the Federal Republic under Article 23 of the Basic Law, but postdated to come into effect on 3 October 1990, and conditional on fundamental amendments being made to the Basic Law in the interim. These amendments were required to implement the series of constitutional changes to the Basic Law that had been agreed both in the Unification Treaty between the GDR and the Federal Republic, and in the 'Two Plus Four Treaty' (Treaty on the Final Settlement with Respect to Germany), and had the general effect of removing or rewording all the clauses (including Article 23) on which the Federal Constitutional Court had relied in support of its claim to the continued legal identity of the German Reich as an 'overall state'. Specifically too, the Basic Law was then amended such that the constitutional duty of the German people to strive for unity and freedom was stated as now fully realised, and consequently that the expanded 'Berlin Republic' could no longer be "legally open" to further accessions of former German territories.

== Constitutional institutions ==
The Basic Law established Germany as a parliamentary democracy with separation of powers into executive, legislative, and judicial branches.

The executive branch consists of the largely ceremonial Federal President as head of state and the Federal Chancellor, the head of government, normally (but not necessarily) the leader of the largest grouping in the Bundestag.

The legislative branch is represented by the Bundestag, elected directly through proportional representation, with the German Länder participating in legislation through the Bundesrat, reflecting Germany's federal structure.

The judicial branch is headed by the Federal Constitutional Court, which oversees the constitutionality of laws.

=== Presidency ===
Political system of Germany, chart

In Germany's parliamentary system of government, the Federal Chancellor runs the government and the day-to-day affairs of state. However, the German President's role is more than merely ceremonial. By his or her actions and public appearances, the Federal President represents the state itself, its existence, its legitimacy, and unity. The President's office has an integrative role and the controlling function of upholding the law and the constitution. It has also a "political reserve function" for times of crisis in the parliamentary system of government. The Federal President gives direction to general political and societal debates and has some important "reserve powers" in case of political instability (such as those provided for by Article 81). Under Article 59 paragraph 1, the Federal President represents the Federal Republic of Germany in matters of international law, concludes treaties with foreign states on its behalf and accredits diplomats. Furthermore, all federal laws must be signed by the President before they can come into effect; however, he/she can only veto a law that he believes to violate the constitution.

=== Executive branch ===
The Chancellor is the head of government and the most influential figure in German day-to-day politics, as well as the head of the Federal Government, consisting of ministers appointed by the Federal President on the Chancellor's suggestion. While every minister governs his or her department autonomously, the Chancellor may issue overriding policy guidelines. The Chancellor is elected for a full term of the Bundestag and can only be dismissed by parliament electing a successor in a "constructive vote of no confidence".

=== Judicial branch ===
==== Federal Constitutional Court ====
The guardian of the Basic Law is the German Federal Constitutional Court (Bundesverfassungsgericht) which is both an independent constitutional organ and at the same time part of the judiciary in the sectors of constitutional law and public international law. Its judgements have the legal status of ordinary law. It is required by law to declare statutes as null and void if they are in violation of the Basic Law. Although judgements of the Federal Constitutional Court are supreme over all other counts, it is not a court of appeal; the FCC only hears constitutional cases, and maintains sole jurisdiction in all such cases, to the exclusion of all other courts.

The court is famous for nullifying several high-profile laws, passed by large majorities in the parliament. An example is the Luftsicherheitsgesetz, which would have allowed the Bundeswehr to shoot down civilian aircraft in case of a terrorist attack. It was ruled to be in violation of the guarantee of life and human dignity in the Basic Law.

The Federal Constitutional Court decides on the constitutionality of laws and government actions under the following circumstances:

- individual complaint – a suit brought by a person alleging that a law or any action of government violated his or her constitutional rights. All possible solutions in the regular courts must have been exhausted beforehand.
- referral by regular court – a court can refer the question as to whether a statute applicable to the case before that court is constitutional.
- abstract regulation control – the federal government, a government of one of the federal states or a quarter of the Bundestag's members can bring suit against a law. In this case the suit need not refer to a specific case of the law's application.

The Weimar Constitution did not institute a court with similar powers. When the Basic Law is amended, this has to be done explicitly; the concerning article must be cited. Under Weimar the constitution could be amended without notice; any law passed with a two-thirds majority vote was not bound by the constitution. Under the Basic Law the fundamentals of the constitution in Articles 1 and 20, the fundamental rights in Articles 1 to 19, and key elements of the federalist state, cannot be removed. Especially important is the protection of the division of state powers into the legislative, executive and judicial branches. This is provided by Article 20. A clear separation of powers was considered imperative to prevent measures like an over-reaching Enabling act, as happened in Germany in 1933. This act had given the government legislative powers which effectively finished the Weimar Republic and led to the dictatorship of Nazi Germany.

==== Other courts ====
Article 95 establishes the Federal Court of Justice, the Federal Administrative Court, the Federal Finance Court, the Federal Labour Court and the Federal Social Court as supreme courts in their respective areas of jurisdiction.

Article 96 authorizes the establishment by federal law of the Federal Patent Court, of federal military criminal courts having jurisdiction only in a state of defence or on soldiers serving abroad, (Note: This authorisation has not been implemented by statute; German soldiers are under the jurisdiction of the civilian court system. See German military law.) and of a federal disciplinary court. (Note: The Federal Disciplinary Court was abolished in 2003 and its jurisdiction merged into the administrative court system. See Bundesdisziplinargericht (in German).) Article 92 establishes that all courts other than the federal courts established under the Basic Law are courts of the Länder.

Article 101 bans extraordinary courts, such as the Volksgerichtshof.

==== General provisions for the judiciary and rights of the accused ====
Article 97 provides for judicial independence. Article 102 abolishes capital punishment.

Article 103 mandates a fair trial, forbids retroactive criminal legislation and multiple punishment for the same criminal act. During the establishment of the Grundgesetz in West Germany, politicians like Thomas Dehler—the federal chairman of the Free Democratic Party (FDP) and Federal Minister of Justice—advocated for the ideal of the Rechtsstaat, or the state molded by the rule of law. Thus, criminal justice issues such as amnesty towards former Nazis, were encompassed by Article 103’s ban on retroactive punishment. This was also echoed by the concept of Schlußstrich, the “final stroke” or settlement on criminal affairs. While politicians raised concerns over granting amnesty to perpetrators who committed or abetted murderous policies under the Nazis, the Bundestag ended up approving Article 103, including an extension of a statute of limitations for Nazi-related murders. When the Basic Law extended its scope into East German regions upon reunification in 1990, concerns regarding Article 103 were enlivened. At the time, courts in the new unified state dealt with the legal dilemma of liability of border guards from the GDR who killed escaping refugees between the former East-West border. Thus, the Federal German Constitutional Court had to decide whether there existed a violation of an inadmissibility of retroactive punishment in the criminal statute. Since Article 103 only permitted prosecution for an offense when it occurred under the applicable law, the Constitutional Court rejected the appeals. The prohibition of retroactive punishment in Article 103 has been likened to double jeopardy in common law systems, such as the U.S.

Article 104 mandates that deprivation of personal liberty must be provided for by statute and authorised by a judge before the end of the day following the arrest (analogous to the common law concept of Habeas corpus), and that a relative or a person in the confidence of the prisoner must be notified of a judicial decision imposing detention. The German Constitution (i.e. the Basic Law of the Federal Republic of Germany) unmistakably outlines the presumption of innocence.

=== Legislative branch ===
==== Bundestag ====
The main body of the legislative branch is Germany's parliament, the Bundestag, which enacts federal legislation, including the budget. Each member of the Bundestag has the right to initiate legislation, as do the cabinet and the Bundesrat. The Bundestag also elects the Chancellor, the head of government, usually (but not necessarily) the leader of the majority party or the party with a plurality of seats in the Bundestag, and takes part in the election of the Federal President.

==== Bundesrat ====
The Bundesrat represents the Länder (states) and participates in federal legislation. The Bundesrat's power has grown over the years, as the fields of federal legislation were extended at the expense of state legislation. In return, the number of laws requiring the assent of the Bundesrat was also extended.

==== Early elections ====
The Basic Law contains no clear provision to call early elections. Neither the chancellor nor the Bundestag has the power to call elections, and the president can do so only if the chancellor so requests after losing a vote of confidence. This was designed to avoid the chronic instability of Weimar Republic governments. However, early elections have been called three times (1972, 1982, and 2005). The last two occasions were considered controversial moves and were referred to the constitutional court for review.

In April 1972, Chancellor Willy Brandt's SPD/FDP coalition had lost its majority in the Bundestag after several defections, so the opposition CDU/CSU proposed Rainer Barzel as the new chancellor in a constructive vote of no confidence. Surprisingly, three representatives of CDU/CSU abstained and the motion failed by two votes. Nevertheless, the coalition clearly could not continue, so Brandt proposed a vote of confidence that September (after the 1972 Summer Olympics in Munich) which failed. It was later revealed that the East German Ministry for State Security had bribed the two dissenting representatives.

In 1982, CDU Chancellor Helmut Kohl had been installed through a constructive vote of no confidence after the FDP dissolved its coalition with the SPD to work with the CDU/CSU instead. He then intentionally lost a confidence vote in order to call an early election to strengthen the new coalition's majority in the Bundestag. The constitutional court examined the case, and decided that the vote was valid, but with reservations. The court emphasized this was only acceptable if the Chancellor has reason to believe he cannot continue to effectively govern with the current balance of power. It decided Kohl could believe this since the FDP was not only deeply divided by the change of coalition, but had already agreed to early elections, meaning in theory it no longer had to support the government.

In 2005, SPD Chancellor Gerhard Schröder led a coalition with the Greens. A heavy defeat for the SPD in the 2005 North Rhine-Westphalia state election gave the opposition a majority in the Bundesrat. Schröder subsequently also called a confidence vote which he deliberately lost. President Horst Köhler then called elections for 18 September 2005. The constitutional court agreed to the validity of this procedure on 25 August 2005, and the elections duly took place.

=== Role of political parties ===
In contrast to Weimar, political parties are explicitly mentioned in the constitution, i.e., officially recognized as important participants in politics. Parties are obliged to adhere to the democratic foundations of the German state. Parties found in violation of this requirement may be abolished by the constitutional court. In the Weimar Republic, the public image of political parties was clearly negative and they were often regarded as vile. At the same time there was no obligation to adhere to democratic standards (in contrast, the Basic Law stipulates that parties' "... internal organisation must conform to democratic principles", which precludes any party using the Führerprinzip, even internally).

== Other stipulations ==
=== Role of the military ===
From the outset, the Basic Law guaranteed the right of conscientious objection to war service (Article 4), and prohibited the Federal Republic from activities preparing for or engaging in aggressive war (Article 26). These provisions remain in force. Also in the 1949 Basic Law, Article 24 empowered the federal government to join international systems for mutual collective security; but made no specific provision for West German rearmament.

The Basic Law was amended in 1955 with Article 87a allowing the creation from new of federal armed forces, the Bundeswehr. The Bundeswehr therefore has no constitutional or legal continuity with either the Reichswehr of the Weimar Republic, or with the Wehrmacht of WWII Germany.

The Weimar Constitution had contributed to the Reichswehr becoming a state within a state, outside of the control of the parliament or the public. The army directly reported to the President who himself was not dependent on the parliament. Under the Basic Law, during times of peace, the Bundeswehr is under the command of the Minister of Defence, and during war-time under the Federal Chancellor. The Chancellor is directly responsible to the parliament, the Minister is indirectly responsible to the parliament because it can remove the entire Cabinet by electing a new chancellor.

The Basic Law also institutes the parliamentary post of the Wehrbeauftragter (defence commissioner), reporting once a year to parliament, not to the executive. The Wehrbeauftragter is a soldiers' ombudsman who can be petitioned directly by soldiers, bypassing the chain of command. Disciplinary measures against soldiers petitioning the Wehrbeauftragter are prohibited. From eleven defence commissioners until 2013 eight performed military or war services. Six hold an officer's rank (or reserve officer's rank), two of them, as Vizeadmiral Hellmuth Heye, were high-ranking and decorated admirals or generals of the Wehrmacht.

Although this is not explicitly spelled out in the Basic Law, a number of Constitutional Court cases in the 1990s established that the military may not be deployed by the government outside of NATO territory without a specific resolution of parliament, which describes the details of the mission and limits its term. There are also strict restrictions on the intervention of the military within Germany (i.e. a ban of the military being used for police-type duties), which generally only allow the military to act in unarmed roles within Germany (such as disaster relief).

=== Referendums and plebiscites ===
Unlike the Weimar Constitution, the Basic Law only names referendums, concerning the federal level of legislation, on a single issue: a new delimitation of the federal territory. Baden-Württemberg was founded following a 1952 referendum that approved the fusion of three separate states. In a 1996 referendum the inhabitants of Berlin and Brandenburg rejected a proposed merger of the two states. After referendums on reestablishing to Länder borders as existed in the Weimar Republic all failed, this institution has not been used, as minor border changes can be done by state contract.

The denial of referendums in other cases was designed to avoid the kind of populism that allowed the rise of Hitler. Yet Article 20 states that "All state authority is derived from the people. It shall be exercised by the people through elections and other votes [Abstimmungen] and through specific legislative, executive and judicial bodies". These other votes—the words are to be understood meaning votes on legislative issues—are, by now, common practice on the level of the Länder. Claims of extending this practice also to the federal level have an undisputed constitutional basis in the Article 20, being the general and unchangeable article on state structure. However, this could only be conferred by a constitutional amendment nevertheless.

== Amendments ==
=== Process ===
Article 79 states the Basic Law may be amended by an absolute two-thirds majority of both the Bundestag and the Bundesrat. Such a vote may not remove any of the principles underlying Articles 1 and 20 as defined by the eternity clause, or remove or otherwise affect the essence of, any of the fundamental rights originally specified in Articles 1 to 19, but may clarify, extend or refine those original principles and fundamental rights. Where however Articles 1 to 20 have subsequently been amended or extended, any additional words and phrases are not protected by the eternity clause but may be further amended or removed through the normal constitutional process.

=== History ===
The Basic Law had been amended 50 times as of 2003. Important changes to the Basic Law were the re-introduction of conscription and the establishment of the Bundeswehr in 1956. Therefore, several articles were introduced into the constitution, e.g., Articles 12a, 17, 45a-c, 65a, 87a-c. Another important reform was the introduction in 1968 of emergency competencies, for example Article 115 paragraph (1). This was done by a grand coalition of the two main political parties (CDU/CSU and SPD) and was accompanied by heated debate. In the following year there were changes to the articles regarding the distribution of taxes between federal government and the states of Germany.

During reunification, the two states discussed the possibility of drafting a new common constitution followed by a plebiscite, as envisioned in Article 146, but this path was ultimately not taken. Instead the Federal Republic of Germany and the German Democratic Republic decided to keep the Basic Law, amended in accordance with the terms of the Two plus Four Treaty, because it had proved to be effective in West Germany. To facilitate reunification and to reassure other states, the FRG made some changes to the Basic Law. Article 23 was fulfilled by reunification itself, and then withdrawn to indicate that there were no other parts of Germany that existed outside of the unified territory.

The question of "using" Article 146 to draw a new constitution, and hold a referendum, was left to the twelfth (and first all-German) Bundestag, which after consideration decided against a new draft. However, the Bundestag passed the constitutional reform of 1994, a minor change, but still fulfilling the constitutional question together with some other amendments between 1990 and 1994. For example, affirmative action was allowed in women's rights under Article 3, and environmental protection was made a policy objective of the state in the new Article 20a. Article 3 was also reworded to ban discrimination on grounds of disability. In 1992, membership in the European Union was institutionalised (new Article 23). For the privatisation of the railways and the postal service, amendments were necessary as well.

Since then, there have only been minor amendments, with the exception of the Balanced Budget Amendment added in 2009, which became fully effective in 2016. In 2002, the protection of animals was explicitly mentioned in Article 20a.

The most controversial debate arose concerning the limitation of the right to asylum in 1993 as in the current version of Article 16a. This change was later challenged and confirmed in a judgment by the constitutional court. Another controversy was spawned by the limitation of the right to the invulnerability of the private domain (Unverletzlichkeit der Wohnung) by means of acoustic observation (Großer Lauschangriff). This was done by changes to Article 13 paragraph (3) and Article 6. The changes were challenged in the Federal Constitutional Court, but the judges confirmed the changes. Other changes took place regarding a redistribution of competencies between federal government and the Länder.

== Literature ==
- Donald P. Kommers, Russell A. Miller (2012): The Constitutional Jurisprudence of the Federal Republic of Germany: Third Edition, Revised and Expanded. Duke University Press, 3rd edition (2nd ed. 1997), ISBN 978-0822352662.
- German Bundestag (2022). Basic Law for the Federal Republic of Germany — Amendments to 28 June 2022 (PDF). Berlin, Germany: German Bundestag. Translated by Christian Tomuschat, David P Currie, Donald P Kommers and Raymond Kerr, in cooperation with the Language Service of the German Bundestag. The translation includes the amendment(s) to the Act by the Act of 28 June 2022 (Federal Law Gazette I p. 968).

== See also ==
- German language in the Basic Law

=== Former constitutions ===
- Constitution of the German Confederation (1815)
  - Constitution of Prussia (1848)
- Frankfurt Constitution (1849)
  - Constitution of Prussia (1850)
- North German Constitution (1867)
- Constitution of the German Confederation (1871)
- Constitution of the German Empire (1871)
- Weimar Constitution (1919)
  - Constitution of Prussia (1920)
  - Reichstag Fire Decree (1933)
  - Enabling Act (1933)
- First Constitution of East Germany (1949)
- Second Constitution of East Germany (1968)

=== Others ===
- Abolition of Prussia
- Bremen clause
- Bundesrechnungshof
- Constitutional economics
- Constitutionalism
- Post-World War II Constitution of Italy
- Post-World War II Constitution of Japan
- German Emergency Acts
- German nationality law
- History of Germany
- Legal status of Germany
- Politics of Germany
- Rechtsstaat
- Reconstruction of Germany
- Rule according to higher law
- Streitbare Demokratie
- United Kingdom constitutional law
