= IG Farben Building =

Building complex of Goethe University Frankfurt, Germany

Coordinates: 50°07′32″N 08°40′03″E

- IG Farben-Haus
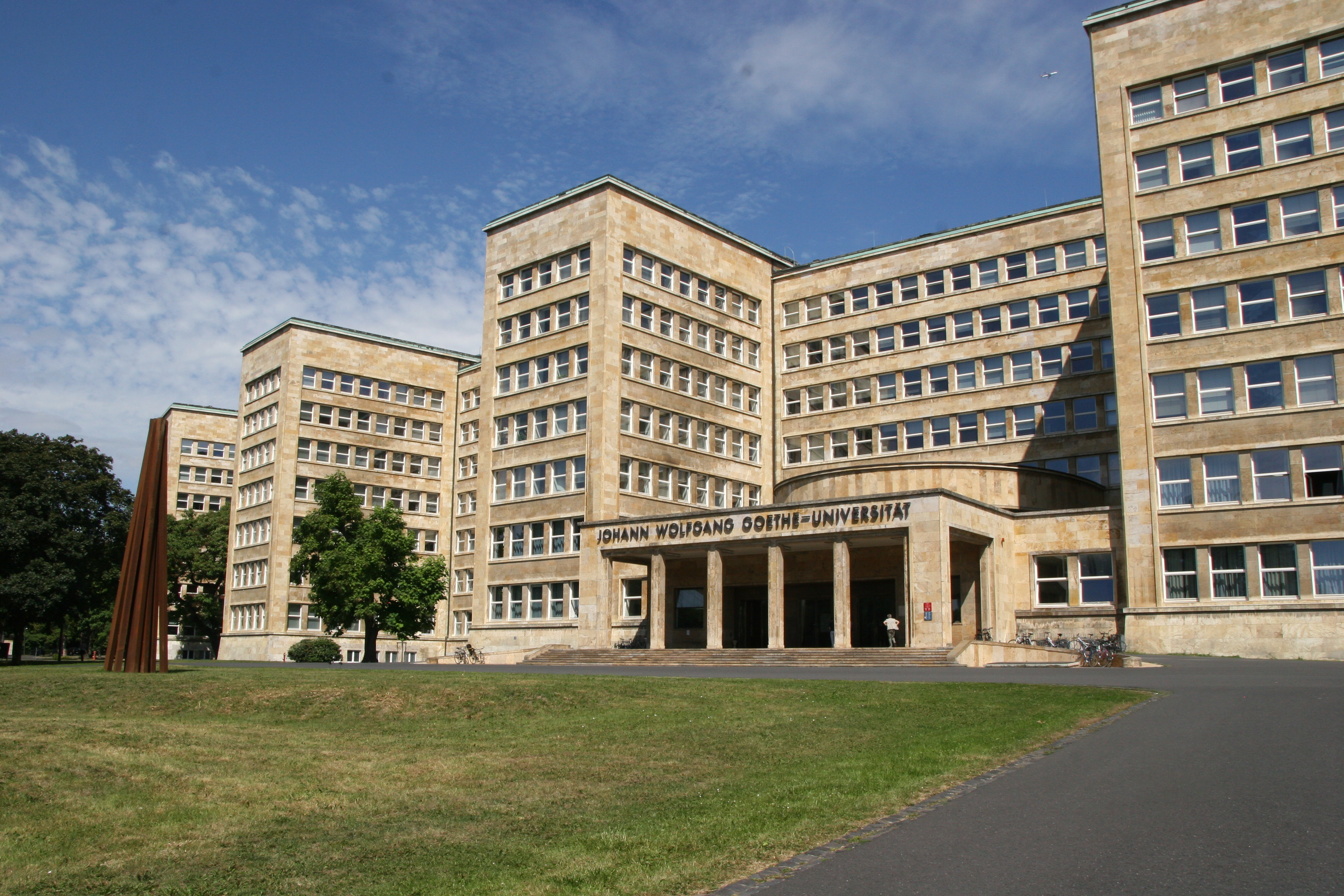
- Main front

General information
- Architectural style: New Objectivity
- Current tenants: Goethe University Frankfurt
- Year built: 1928–1931
- Owner: State of Hesse

Design and construction
- Architect: Hans Poelzig

Website
- IG Farben Building

The IG Farben Building (German: IG Farben-Haus), also known as the Poelzig Building (Poelzig-Bau), is a building complex in Frankfurt, Germany. It is the central building of the Westend Campus of Goethe University Frankfurt. Designed by Hans Poelzig in the New Objectivity style and completed in 1931, it was built as the corporate headquarters of IG Farben. It was the largest building constructed in the Weimar Republic and remained Europe's largest office complex until the 1950s.

Under Nazi rule, IG Farben became part of Germany's war economy and used forced labour, including at Buna-Monowitz near Auschwitz. The Norbert Wollheim Memorial in front of the IG Farben Building commemorates the company's forced labourers.

After American forces occupied Frankfurt in March 1945, the building became a headquarters for the Allied and American military administrations. Dwight D. Eisenhower worked there, and the Frankfurt Documents, an important step towards the founding of West Germany, were presented there in 1948. The building later housed the United States Army's V Corps and was named the General Creighton W. Abrams Building in 1975. The United States returned the complex to German control in 1995.

The state of Hesse acquired the site for Goethe University in 1996. Following renovation, the building reopened in 2001. It now contains humanities institutes, a library centre and the Fritz Bauer Institute, as well as a permanent exhibition about the site's history.

== History ==
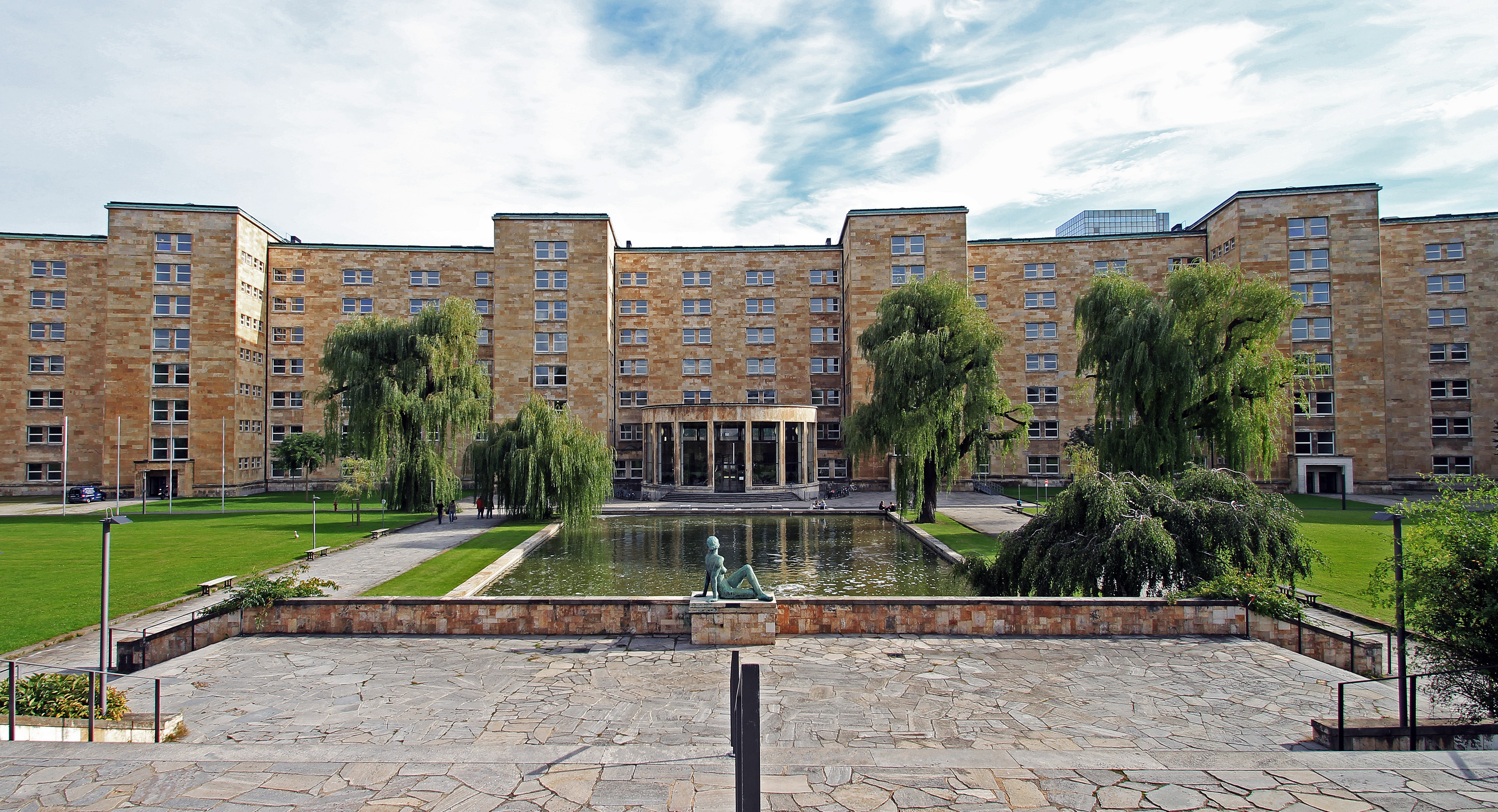
Rear of the building

=== Site and construction ===
IG Farben, formed in 1925 through the merger of Germany's largest chemical companies, wanted a headquarters that would express the scale of the new corporation. The complex stands on the former Grüneburg site in Frankfurt's Westend. Part of the site had housed the city's psychiatric hospital. After protests stopped IG Farben from building its headquarters on a site near the Main, the city exchanged the disused hospital grounds for the company's riverside property in 1927.

A restricted competition invited designs from Paul Bonatz, Fritz Höger, Jacob Koerfer, Hans Poelzig, Ernst May and Martin Elsaesser, as well as the company's own architects. The board selected Poelzig's proposal, an elongated, slightly curved main block with six transverse wings and a separate casino building.

Construction began in 1928. A steel frame, modern cranes and round-the-clock working helped meet a three-year deadline, although changes ordered during construction included removing two large end wings and relocating the exhibition hall to create the rear rotunda. The building was completed in 1931. Its 250-metre-long, seven-storey main block was the largest building erected during the Weimar Republic and remained Europe's largest office complex until the 1950s.

=== IG Farben and the Second World War ===
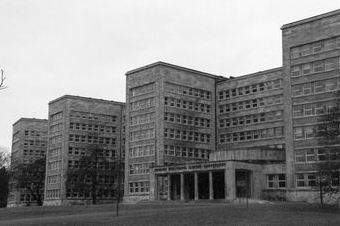
The building from the south-east, with its portico entrance and rear rotunda

The building served as IG Farben's administrative headquarters until the end of the Second World War. The company became a major part of the Nazi war economy and used forced labour, including at its Buna-Monowitz plant near Auschwitz. The university's later memorial programme addresses both this history and the victims of the company's products and forced-labour system.

Much of Frankfurt was destroyed by bombing, but the building survived largely undamaged. Its survival later gave rise to a rumour that Allied bombers had deliberately spared it for possible use by Allied authorities after the war. Contemporary accounts instead record that the building's good condition and Frankfurt's transport connections attracted the attention of the American command after the city was occupied on 29 March 1945.

=== American occupation and Cold War ===
The Supreme Headquarters Allied Expeditionary Force moved into the building in 1945. After SHAEF was dissolved in July, Eisenhower continued to work there as military governor and commander of United States Forces, European Theater. His former office, a first-floor conference room in wing Q3, is now known as Eisenhower Hall. It hosted meetings with commanders including Charles de Gaulle, Bernard Montgomery and Georgy Zhukov.

The building subsequently housed the American military government. On 1 July 1948, the Frankfurt Documents were presented to the western German state premiers in Eisenhower's former office, asking them to convene a constituent assembly and draft a federal constitution. From 1949 to 1952, the building housed the United States High Commissioner for Germany. The Central Intelligence Agency also based its German headquarters in the building.

The United States Army's V Corps moved into the building in 1951, and the complex became informally known as the "Pentagon of Europe". On 11 May 1972, the Red Army Faction bombed the complex, killing Lieutenant Colonel Paul A. Bloomquist and injuring thirteen people. Three further attacks followed. In 1975, the army named the building for General Creighton Abrams. It remained a centre of American military planning until the United States withdrew from Frankfurt and returned the building to German authorities in 1995.

=== Goethe University ===
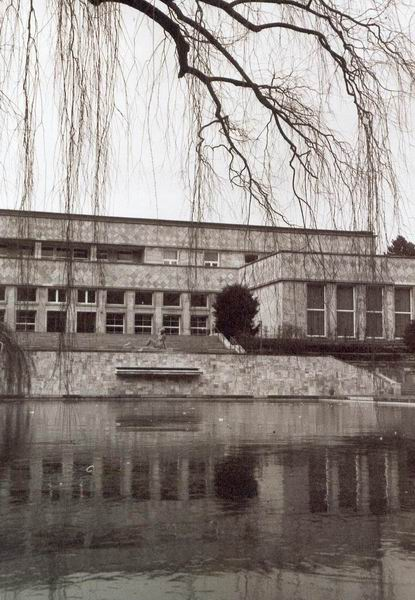
The reflecting pool and Fritz Klimsch's sculpture Am Wasser, with the Casino behind

The state of Hesse acquired the complex from the federal government in 1996 for Goethe University. The Danish practice Dissing+Weitling won the architectural competition to adapt the listed building, balancing university use with the preservation of Poelzig's design. The refurbished building reopened on 26 October 2001 and became the first major element of the Westend Campus. It now contains university units in theology, philosophy, history, modern languages, archaeology and cultural studies. The Humanities Library Center occupies the two outer wings, Q1 and Q6, and the Fritz Bauer Institute is in wing Q3.

==== Name and commemoration ====
The university's move prompted debate over whether the building should retain a name associated with IG Farben or be named for Poelzig. On 23 July 2014, the university senate made IG Farben-Haus its official name, regarding it as a reminder of the site's history. Poelzig-Bau nevertheless remains a common name for the building.

The permanent exhibition From Grüneburg to Westend Campus is installed across floors one to five of wings Q3 and Q4. Memorial plaques stand in the entrance hall, and the Norbert Wollheim Memorial in front of the building commemorates the forced labourers of the Buna-Monowitz concentration camp. Its photographic panels are linked to video interviews with survivors.

==== Campus expansion ====
Westend Campus continued to develop after the university moved into the historic complex. A building for languages and cultural studies opened in September 2022, consolidating several subjects that had remained at the Bockenheim campus. The Center for Humanities reached the topping-out stage in May 2025 and was expected to open in 2026. Earlier projections that the central library and student union would move to Westend had not been realised by September 2026: the central library continued to operate at Campus Bockenheim, and the student union remained there pending completion of a new building at Westend.

== Building ==
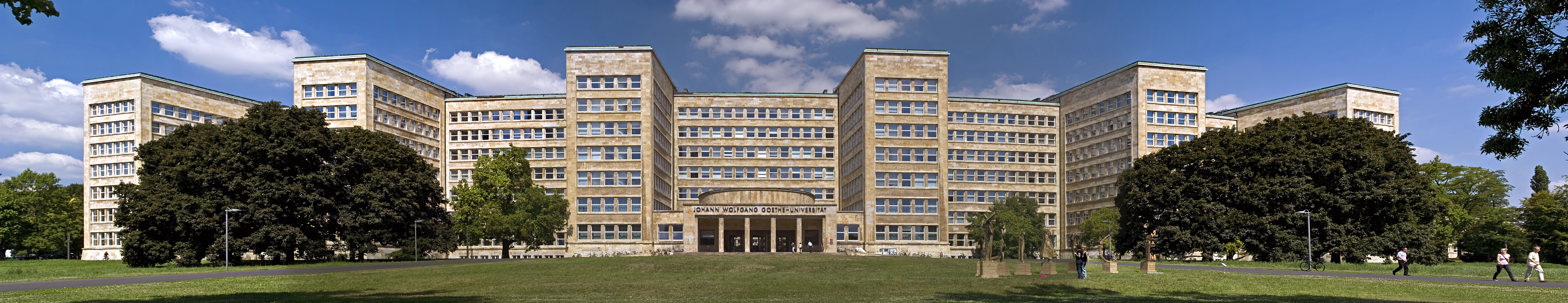
South façade of the IG Farben Building showing the main entrance

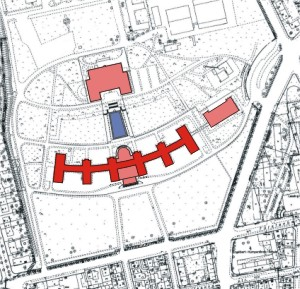
Plan showing the six wings (Q1–Q6), the curved central corridor (V1–V5) and the Casino building to the rear

The main block is 250 metres long and consists of six wings connected by a gently curved central corridor. The arrangement brought daylight and ventilation to the offices while avoiding the enclosed courtyards common in large office buildings of the period. Its steel frame is faced with travertine, and horizontal window bands emphasise the curve of the façade. Poelzig's design combined monumental scale with the repetitive forms of industrial construction.

The principal entrance is a temple-like portico at the centre of the front façade. Inside, a foyer with curved staircases leads to the rear rotunda, whose glazed wall looks across a reflecting pool towards the separate Casino building. During the American occupation the rotunda served as a snack bar; after restoration it was named the Eisenhower Rotunda. It now contains Café Rotunde and is also used for events. It is distinct from Eisenhower Hall, his former first-floor office in room IG 1.314.

The building's restored paternoster lifts remain in operation. One provides vertical circulation within the Humanities Library Center, whose collections occupy eight or nine levels in the outer wings.

The reflecting pool behind the main building includes Fritz Klimsch's bronze sculpture Am Wasser, completed in 1930. A photograph from late 1945 shows it still beside the pool after the complex became an American headquarters. The sculpture was installed at Hoechst by 1956 and returned to the pool on 13 June 1991. A local story attributed its removal to Mamie Eisenhower, but an archival study found conflicting records and could not establish when or why it had been moved.

The former Casino, later the United States officers' Terrace Club, now contains the Mensa Casino refectory; its upper floor is used for university events.
