= Elisabeth Selbert =

German politician and lawyer (1896–1986)

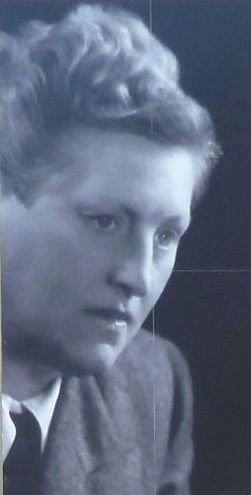
- Born: Martha Elisabeth Rohde; 22 September 1896; Kassel, Hesse-Nassau, Kingdom of Prussia, German Reich
- Died: 9 June 1986 (aged 89); Kassel, Hesse, West Germany
- Occupations: lawyer, politician
- Years active: 1919–1982
- Spouse: Adam Selbert (m. 1920; died 1965)

Elisabeth Selbert (22 September 1896 – 9 June 1986) was a German politician and lawyer. She was one of the four women who worked on the Basic Law for the Federal Republic of Germany, collectively called the Mütter des Grundgesetzes (English: Mothers of the Basic Law). She had a central role in ensuring that explicit equality between men and women was included as a fundamental right in the Basic Law.

== Early life ==
Selbert was born Martha Elisabeth Rohde on 22 September 1896 in Kassel, the second of four daughters in a Christian family. She received a traditional upbringing for the time, which meant there was no expectation that she would struggle for equality. She learned to embroider, sew, and knit, and had little time for reading.

Her family could not afford to send her to high school, so from 1912, she attended the Kassel Industrial and Commercial School of the Women's Educational Association. Her goal at this time was to become a teacher. Lack of money prevented her achieving this, and she started work as a foreign correspondent for an import/export firm.

In 1914, after losing this job, she worked in the Telegraphendienst der Reichspost ((in German) "Telegraph Service of the Reich Post"), receiving this position because of the shortage of male workers during the First World War. Here, in 1918, in the middle of the November Revolution, she met her future husband, the scholar Adam Selbert, who was then chair of the Arbeiter- und Soldatenrat ((in German) "Workers' and Soldiers' Council") in Niederzwehren near Kassel. Adam promoted Elisabeth and took her to political events, and at the end of 1918, she joined the German Social Democrats.

== Weimar Republic ==
Philipp Scheidemann, who was then Lord Mayor of Kassel and later became Reichskanzler ((in German) "Chancellor of the Reich"), encouraged Selbert to become active in politics. After the Weimar Republic was founded, women received suffrage, and Selbert wrote many articles and spoke at numerous events about women's duty to inform themselves about, and engage in, politics.

In 1919 Selbert stood for parliament as the candidate for the Niederzwehren municipality, and worked in the Finance Committee. She was already interested in equality, and in October 1920 she went as a delegate to the first National Women's Conference in Kassel, where she said:

Now women have equal rights, but we are only equal on paper.

A year before, the Weimar Constitution had established the same civil rights for men and women. But the reality for most women had not changed, and even the state had not altered much.

In 1920, she married Adam Selbert, and a year later her first child was born, followed shortly by a second. She continued to work in the telegraph office while caring for the children, and still found time for politics. However, she was aware her knowledge of theory was lacking, and hoped that a legal education would empower her political work.

She became a home student for a baccalaureate, and in 1925 earned it, sitting the exam as an external candidate. She studied law and political science, first at the University of Marburg as the only female student. Shortly afterwards she moved to the University of Göttingen. Here, she was one of five or so women students in a class of three hundred. Selbert was not a difficult student, but her professors sometimes seemed overwhelmed. The women were asked to leave the auditorium while the professor spoke about sex crimes.

After only six semesters, Selbert graduated with honours, and received her doctorate in 1930. Her thesis was on Zerrüttung als Ehescheidungsgrund ((in German) "Dislocation as Grounds for Divorce"). She was critical of the "principle of guilt", that women often had no rights in divorce. Her proposed solutions were far ahead of their time, and were not implemented in Germany until 1977.

In the 1933 election, Selbert was on the national list for the Reichstag, but was not elected because that was when the Nazis seized power.

== Nazi years ==
After the Nazi takeover, Adam Selbert lost his job and was placed in "protective custody". At her husband's insistence, Selbert applied for admission to the legal profession.

Haste was needed because the Nazis tried to expel women from all legal professions entirely. Nazi sympathiser Otto Palandt, former President of the District Court in Kassel, was in charge of the National Judicial Examinations Office, and responsible for legal education and admission to the legal profession. On 22 July 1934, new regulations were introduced, which came into force on 20 December 1934. These prevented women from applying for admission to the Bar.

Selbert should have been rejected under these rules, but despite Palandt's wishes, despite the Bar Association's vote, and despite the Nazi lawyers, she was admitted to the Oberlandesgericht ((in German) "Higher National Court") on 15 December 1934 — five days before the cutoff. Two former Senate Presidents were in favour of Selbert, and deputising for Palandt during the Christmas holiday, they approved her.

Selbert began to practice law in 1934. Since her husband was unemployed until 1945, she had to feed her family.

== Post-war period ==
After the Nazi defeat, in 1946 Selbert was elected to the State Consultative Assembly representing the Social Democratic Party for Greater Hesse. In 1948, she was tasked with helping to draw up the constitution of the Federal Republic of Germany. The original wording of Article 3 was from the Weimar Constitution, reading: "Men and women have the same civil rights and duties." Selbert prefaced this with: "As an imperative mandate to the legislature...". As a result of this constitutional principle, many of the old family law provisions (that dated back to 1896) had to be revised to bring them into conformity.

With the help of women's rights organisations and other members, Selbert could finally enforce equal rights.

She then sought a mandate for the German parliament, but did not succeed. Her nomination as the first judge on the Constitutional Court also failed in 1958, not least because of lack of support from the Social Democratic Party.

Selbert left politics and almost sank into oblivion. She continued to work as a lawyer in her practice, which specialised in family law, until she was eighty-five. She died in her home town of Kassel on 9 June 1986.

Since 1983, the Hesse State Government has biannually awarded the Elisabeth Selbert Prize, "in recognition of outstanding performance for promoting equal opportunities between women and men."

== Honours ==
She was awarded the Great Federal Cross of Merit in 1956. In 1969 she received a heraldic award and in 1978, the Wilhelm-Leuschner Medal of the State of Hesse. In 1984 the city of Kassel honoured her, and many cities have streets named after her.

== Sources ==
- Barbara Böttger: The right to equality and difference. Münster 1990: ISBN 3-924550-44-1
- Drummer Heike (ed.): Elisabeth Selbert. The great advocate of equal rights. Frankfurt am Main 1999: ISBN 3-8218-1607-4
- Heinrich Wilms: Documents on the emergence of the Basic Law in 1948 and 1949. Stuttgart 2001: ISBN 3-17-016024-9
- Giesela Notz: Women in the team. Social Democrats in the Parliamentary Council and the German Bundestag 1948/49 to 1957. Bonn 2003: ISBN 3-8012-4131-9
