= Austrian State Treaty =

1955 treaty re-establishing Austria as a sovereign state

- Type: Multilateral treaty
- Signed: 15 May 1955
- Location: Vienna, Austria
- Effective: 27 July 1955
- Parties: Austria; France; Soviet Union; United Kingdom; United States; Yugoslavia

Occupation zones in Austria, 1945–1955

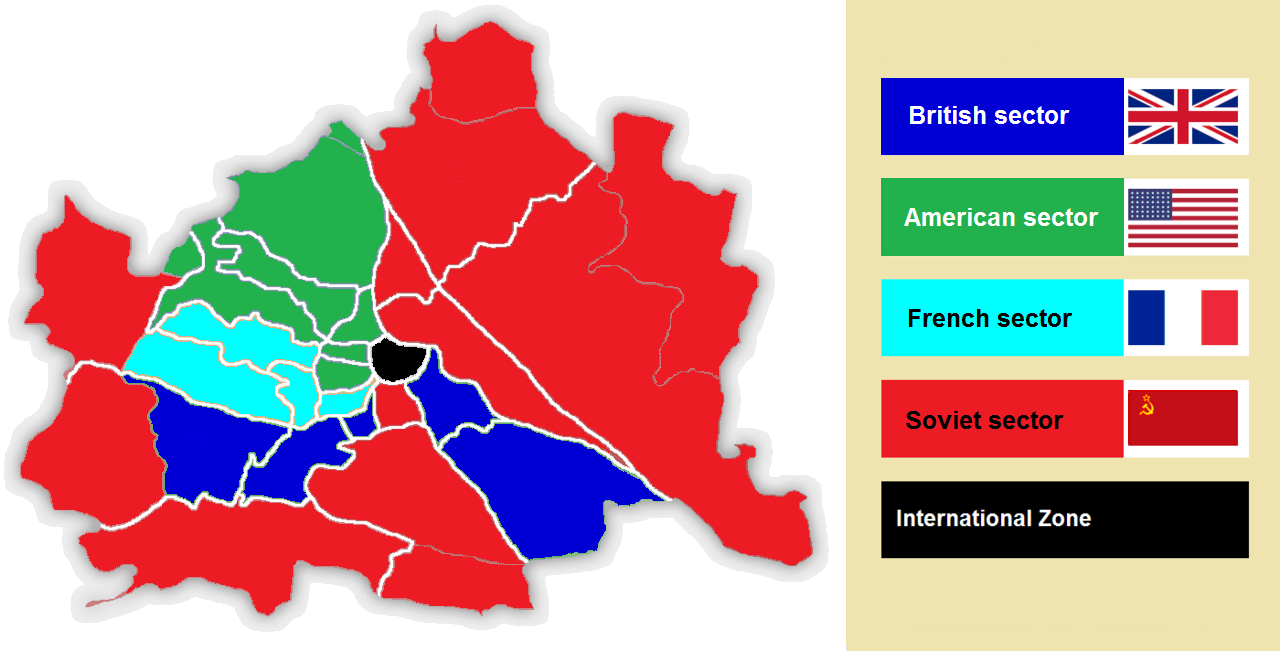
Occupation zones in Vienna, 1945–1955

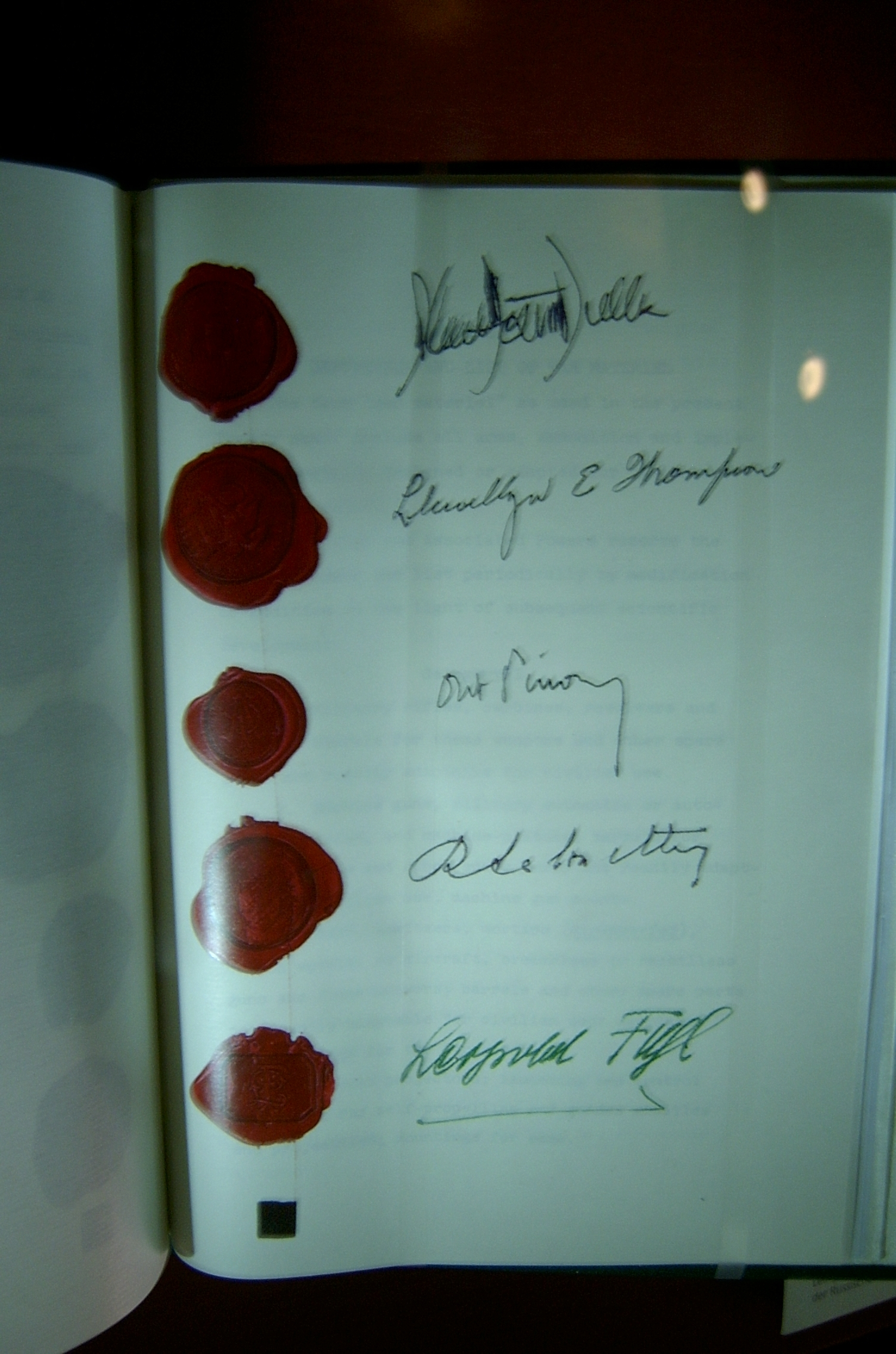
Austrian State Treaty with signatures of Dulles, Thompson, Pinay, Lalouette, and Leopold Figl, foreign minister of Austria

The Austrian State Treaty (German: Österreichischer Staatsvertrag [ˈøːstɐraɪçɪʃɐ ˈʃtaːtsfɐˌtraːɡ]) or Austrian Independence Treaty established Austria as a sovereign state. It was signed on 15 May 1955 in Vienna, at the Schloss Belvedere among the Allied occupying powers (France, the United Kingdom, the United States, and the Soviet Union) and the Austrian government. The neighbouring Federal People's Republic of Yugoslavia acceded to the treaty subsequently. It officially came into force on 27 July 1955.

Its full title is "Treaty for the re-establishment of an independent and democratic Austria, signed in Vienna on 15 May 1955" (German: Staatsvertrag betreffend die Wiederherstellung eines unabhängigen und demokratischen Österreichs, unterzeichnet in Wien am 15. Mai).

== Generalities and structure ==
The treaty re-established a free, sovereign and democratic Austria. The basis for the treaty was the Moscow Declaration of 30 October 1943. The agreement and its annexes provided for Soviet oilfield concessions and property rights of oil refineries in Eastern Austria and the transfer of the assets of the Danube Shipping Company to the USSR.

=== Treaty signatories ===
- Allied foreign ministers:
  - Vyacheslav Molotov (Soviet Union);
  - John Foster Dulles (United States);
  - Harold Macmillan (United Kingdom);
  - Antoine Pinay (France).
- High commissioners of the occupying powers:
  - Ivan I. Ilitchov (Soviet Union);
  - Geoffrey Wallinger (United Kingdom);
  - Llewellyn E. Thompson Jr. (United States);
  - Roger Lalouette (France).
- Austrian foreign minister:
  - Leopold Figl.

=== Nine parts of the treaty ===
- Preamble
- Political and territorial provisions
- Military and air travel provisions
- Reparations
- Ownership, law, and interests
- Economic relations
- Rules for disputes
- Economic provisions
- Final provisions

== Development ==
After the Anschluss in 1938, Austria had generally been recognized as part of Nazi Germany. In 1943, however, the Allies agreed in the Declaration of Moscow that Austria would instead be regarded as the first victim of Nazi aggression — without denying Austria's role in Nazi crimes — and treated as a liberated and independent country after the war.

In the immediate aftermath of World War II, the Allied occupation of Austria started on 27 April 1945 when Austria, under Allied control, claimed independence from Germany as a result of the Vienna Offensive. Austria was divided into four zones and jointly occupied by the United Kingdom, the Soviet Union, the United States, and France. Vienna was similarly subdivided, but the central district was collectively administered by the Allied Control Council.

Whereas Germany was divided into East and West Germany in 1949, Austria remained under joint occupation of the Western Allies and the Soviet Union until 1955; its status became a controversial subject in the Cold War. First attempts to negotiate a treaty were made by the first post-war government. However, they failed because the Allies wanted to see a peace treaty with Germany first. A treaty became less likely with the development of the Cold War. However, Austria successfully held its part of Carinthia against the demands of a resurgent Federal People's Republic of Yugoslavia, even though the issue of potential reunification with South Tyrol, annexed by Italy from Austria-Hungary in 1919, was not addressed.

The climate for negotiations improved with Joseph Stalin's death in 1953 and the warming of relations known as the Khrushchev Thaw. Negotiations with the Soviet foreign minister, Vyacheslav Molotov, secured the breakthrough in February 1955.

After Austrian promises of perpetual neutrality, Austria was accorded full independence on 15 May 1955, and the last occupation troops left on 25 October that year.

== Important points in the treaty ==
As well as general regulations and recognition of the Austrian state, the minority rights of the Slovene and Croat minorities were also expressly detailed. Anschluss (Austria's political union with Germany), as had happened in 1938, was forbidden (German recognition of Austria's sovereignty and independence and renunciation by Germany of territorial claims over Austria were later covered in general terms in the 1990 Treaty on the Final Settlement with Respect to Germany about existing borders, but not specifically). Nazi and fascist organizations were prohibited. The interpretation of the treaty when in dispute was to be done by the Allied and Associated Powers.

== Austrian neutrality ==
A common misconception is that the Austrian State Treaty contains a provision on Austria's permanent neutrality. This is not the case; there is no legal relation between Austria's neutrality and the State Treaty. However, there was a political connection, as the promise that Austria would declare their permanent neutrality was one of the reasons the Soviet Union agreed to the treaty.

Austrian neutrality was instituted through the Declaration of Neutrality, which was enacted as a Constitutional Law by the Austrian Parliament on 26 October 1955, one day after the last Allied troops were to leave Austria according to the treaty. This law states that "Austria of her own free will declares herewith her permanent neutrality" and provides that "Austria will never in the future accede to any military alliances nor permit the establishment of military bases of foreign States on her territory." Consistent with the declaration, Austria never joined either NATO or the Warsaw Pact.

Austria's neutrality model is often referred to as a "permanent neutrality" or "constitutional neutrality" model. This means that Austria has committed itself to a policy of neutrality in its foreign relations, which is anchored in the country's constitution and is not subject to change by simple legislation.

The key features of Austria's neutrality model are:

1. Non-participation in military alliances: Austria does not participate in any military alliances, such as NATO or the Warsaw Pact (which dissolved in 1991);
2. No foreign military bases: Austria does not allow any foreign military bases on its territory;
3. Neutrality in international conflicts: Austria maintains a policy of neutrality in international conflicts, avoiding taking sides or providing military support to any party;
4. UN membership: Austria is a member of the United Nations and participates in UN peacekeeping operations, but only in a non-combat role. This was different from the Swiss neutrality model, since Switzerland could not join the United Nations until its constitution was replaced by way of a 1999 referendum.

Austria's neutrality model has been successful in maintaining the country's independence and sovereignty, and it has allowed Austria to play a role as a bridge between East and West during the Cold War. Today, Austria continues to maintain its neutrality policy, while also participating actively in European and international affairs. The Austrian neutrality model has been cited as a possible inspiration for Ukraine's own neutrality aspirations, with some arguing that a similar model could provide a solution to the country's security challenges.

== Result ==
As a result of the treaty, the Allies left Austrian territory on 25 October 1955. 26 October came to be celebrated as a national holiday (called the Day of the Flag until 1965). It is sometimes thought to commemorate the withdrawal of Allied troops, but in fact celebrates the anniversary of the Declaration of Neutrality.

== See also ==
- Allied-occupied Austria
- Austrian Armed Forces
- History of Vienna § The Second Republic
- Samuel Reber
