= Allied Control Council =

1945–1991 military governing body

Allied Control Council (ACC)
- Military occupation of Germany and Austria
- Military occupation zones of Germany (1945–1949) and Austria (1945–1955)
- Date formed: 5 June 1945; 81 years ago
- Date dissolved: 20 September 1949; 77 years ago (de facto); 15 March 1991; 35 years ago (de jure)

People and organisations
- Military Governor: See list of administrators
- High Commissioner: See list of administrators

History
- Predecessor: Flensburg Government
- Successor: Allied High Commission; First Adenauer cabinet (from 20 September 1949); Council of Ministers of East Germany (from November 1950)

The Allied Control Council (ACC) or Allied Control Authority (German: Alliierter Kontrollrat), also referred to as the Four Powers (Vier Mächte), was the governing body of the Allied occupation zones in Germany (1945–1949/1991) and Austria (1945–1955) following the end of World War II in Europe. Its members (Four-Power Authorities) were the Soviet Union, the United Kingdom, the United States, and France. Following the defeat of the Nazis, Germany (less its former eastern territories) and Austria were occupied as two different areas, both by the same four Allies. Both were later divided into four zones by the 1 August 1945 Potsdam Agreement. The organisation was based in Schöneberg, West Berlin.

The council was convened to determine several plans for postwar Europe, including how to change borders and transfer populations in Central Europe. As the four powers had joined themselves into a condominium asserting supreme power in Germany, the Allied Control Council was constituted the sole legal sovereign authority for Germany as a whole, replacing the civil government of Germany under the Nazi Party. In 1948, the Soviets withdrew from the ACC due to its conflict with the Western Allies, who then established the Allied High Commission. In 1949, two German states (West and East Germany) were founded.

== Creation ==
Newsreel from 1945 about the control council

Allied preparations for the postwar occupation of Germany began during the second half of 1944, after Allied forces began entering Germany in September 1944. Most of the planning was carried out by the European Advisory Commission (EAC) established in early 1944. By 3 January 1944, the Working Security Committee in the EAC concluded that:

It is recognised that, in view of the chaotic conditions to be anticipated in Germany, whether a capitulation occurs before invasion or after invasion and consequent establishment of military government, an initial period of military government in Germany is inevitable and should be provided for.

The EAC also recommended the creation of a tripartite British, US and Soviet agency to conduct German affairs following the Nazis' surrender. The British representative at the EAC, Sir William Strang, was undecided on whether a partial occupation of Germany by Allied troops was the most desirable course of action. At the first EAC meeting on 14 January 1944, Strang proposed alternatives that favored the total occupation of Germany, similar to the situation following the First World War when Allied rule was established over the Rhineland. Strang believed that a full occupation would limit the reliance on former Nazis to maintain order within Germany. He also believed that it would make the lessons of defeat more visible to the German population and would enable the Allied governments to carry out punitive policies in Germany, such as transferring territories to Poland. The main arguments against total occupation were that it would create an untold burden on Allied economies and prolong the suffering of the German population, possibly driving new revanchist ideologies. However, his final conclusion was that a total occupation would be most beneficial, at least during the initial phase. In August 1944, the US government established the United States Group to the Control Council for Germany, which served as a liaison group within the EAC for planning the future occupation of entire Germany. The chairman of this group was Brigadier general Cornelius W. Wickersham.

As the German collapse approached, Strang became convinced that Germany was about to undergo a total collapse, in which case a total occupation and control would be inevitable. He even proposed a draft declaration to be issued by the Allied governments in case no political authority remained in Germany due to chaotic conditions. For a brief period, this prospect was feared by some Allied representatives.

Following the suicide of Adolf Hitler on 30 April 1945, Karl Dönitz assumed the title of Reichspräsident in accordance with Hitler's last political testament. As such, he authorised the signing of the unconditional surrender of all German armed forces, which took effect on 8 May 1945 and tried to establish a government under Lutz Graf Schwerin von Krosigk in Flensburg. This government was not recognised by the Allies and Dönitz and the other members were arrested on 23 May by British forces.

The German Instrument of Surrender signed in Berlin had been drafted by the Supreme Headquarters Allied Expeditionary Force and was modeled on the one used a few days previously for the surrender of the German forces in Italy. It was not the document which had been drafted for the surrender of Germany by the "European Advisory Commission" (EAC). This created a legal problem for the Allies, because although the German military forces had surrendered unconditionally, no counterpart civilian German government had been included in the surrender. This was considered a very important issue, inasmuch as Hitler had used the surrender of the civilian government but not of the military, in 1918, to create the "stab in the back" argument. The Allies understandably did not want to give any future hostile German regime any kind of legal argument to resurrect an old quarrel. Eventually, determined not to accord any recognition to the Flensburg administration, they agreed to sign a four-power declaration of the terms of the German surrender instead. On 5 June 1945, in Berlin, the supreme commanders of the four occupying powers signed a common Declaration Regarding the Defeat of Germany (the so-called Berlin Declaration of 1945), which formally confirmed the total dissolution of Nazi Germany with the death of Adolf Hitler on 30 April 1945 and the consequent termination of any German governance over the nation:

The Governments of the United States of America, the Union of Soviet Socialist Republics and the United Kingdom of Great Britain and Northern Ireland and the Provisional Government of the French Republic, hereby assume supreme authority with respect to Germany, including all the powers possessed by the German Government, the High Command and any state, municipal, or local government or authority. The assumption, for the purposes stated above, of the said authority and powers does not affect the annexation of Germany.

— US Department of State, Treaties and Other International Acts Series, No. 1520.

This imposition was in line with Article 4 of the Instrument of Surrender that had been included so that the EAC document, or something similar, could be imposed on the Germans after the military surrender. Article 4 stated that "This act of military surrender is without prejudice to and will be superseded by any general instrument of surrender imposed by, or on behalf of the United Nations and applicable to GERMANY and the German armed forces as a whole". In reality, of course, German authority had ceased to exist since all remaining German armed forces had surrendered before. These parts of the Berlin declaration, therefore, merely formalised the de facto status and placed the Allied military rule over Germany on a solid legal basis.

An additional agreement was signed on 20 September 1945 and further elaborated the powers of the Control Council.

The actual exercise of power was carried out according to the model first laid out in the "Agreement on Control Machinery in Germany" that had been signed by the United States, the United Kingdom and the Soviet Union on 14 November 1944 in London based on the work of the EAC. Germany was divided into four zones of occupation — British, American, French and Soviet — each being ruled by the commander-in-chief of the respective occupation forces. "Matters that affect Germany as a whole", however, would have to be decided jointly by all four commanders-in-chief, who for this purpose would form a single organ of control. This authority was called the Control Council.

The purpose of the Allied Control Council in Germany, like the other Allied Control Commissions and Councils which were established by the Allies over every defeated Axis power, was to deal with the central administration of the country (an idea that hardly materialised in the case of Germany, as that administration totally broke down with the end of the war) and to assure that the military administration was carried out with a certain uniformity throughout all of Germany. The Potsdam Agreement of 1 August 1945 further specified the tasks of the Control Council.

== Operation ==
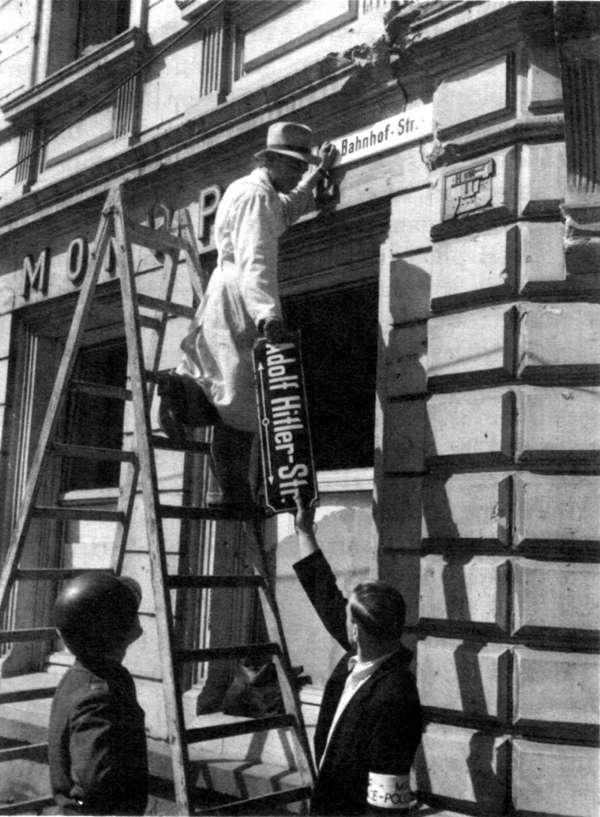
Removing an "Adolf Hitler Street" sign, part of denazification

On 30 August 1945, the Control Council constituted itself and issued its first proclamation, which informed the German people of the council's existence and asserted that the commands and directives issued by the commanders-in-chief in their respective zones were not affected by the establishment of the council. The initial members of the Control Council were Marshal Georgy Zhukov for the Soviet Union, General of the Army Dwight D. Eisenhower for the United States, Field Marshal Bernard Montgomery for the United Kingdom and General Jean de Lattre de Tassigny for France.

Subsequently, the Control Council issued a substantial number of laws, directives, orders and proclamations. They dealt with the abolition of Nazi laws and organisations, demilitarisation, and denazification, but also with such comparatively pedestrian matters as telephone tariffs and the combat of venereal diseases. On many issues, the council was unable to impose its resolutions, as real power lay in the hands of the separate Allied governments and their military governors and the council issued recommendations that did not have the force of law. On 20 September 1945, the council issued Directive no. 10, which divided the various official acts of the Control Council into five categories:

- Proclamations – "to announce matters or acts of special importance to the occupying power or to the German people, or to both";
- Laws – "on matters of general application, unless they expressly provide otherwise";
- Orders – "when the Control Council has a requirement to impose on Germany and when laws are not used";
- Directives – "to communicate policy or administrative decisions of the Control Council";
- Instructions – "when the Control Council wishes to impose requirements directly upon a particular authority".

Directive No. 11 of the same day made the work of the council more orderly by establishing English, French, Russian and German as the official languages of the council and by establishing an official gazette to publish the council's official acts.

Law No. 1 of the Control Council (also enacted on 20 September 1945) repealed some of the stricter Nazi-era laws. This established the legal basis for the council's work.

Directive No. 51 (29 April 1947), repealing Directive No. 10, simplified the council's legislative work by reducing the categories of legislative acts to Proclamations, Laws and Orders.

=== War criminals ===
Directive No. 9 (30 August 1945) charged the legal division of the council with responsibility for carrying out the provisions of the London Agreement on the prosecution of German war criminals, signed in London on 8 August.

Shortly after the commencement of the Nuremberg trials, the council enacted Law no. 10 (20 December 1945), which authorised every occupying power to have its own legal system to try war criminals and to conduct such trials independently of the International Military Tribunal then sitting at Nuremberg. Law no. 10 resulted from disagreements arising among the Allied governments regarding a common policy on war criminals and marked the beginning of the decline in inter-Allied cooperation to that effect. Following the conclusion of the Nuremberg Trial of Major War Criminals in October 1946, inter-Allied cooperation on war crimes totally collapsed.

On 12 October 1946, the council issued Directive No. 38, which, while trying to impose some common rules, allowed the four occupation governments discretion as to the treatment of persons arrested by them for suspected war crimes, including the right to grant amnesty.

=== Dissolution of the German army and government agencies ===
Order No. 1 of 30 August 1945 prohibited the wearing of the uniform of the German Army, which now ceased to exist.

An order dated 10 September ordered the recall of all German government agents and diplomatic representatives from the countries to which they were assigned. Another order of the same day established a procedure for disseminating information to the press on the council's work, ordering that a press release be issued following every meeting of the council.

Directive No. 18 (12 November 1945) provided for the dissolution of all German Army units, all within a time limit to be decided upon. This directive reflects the policy taken by the Western Allied governments of using German military units for their own logistical purposes, a move objected to by the Soviet government. The complete dissolution of all German military units and military training was provided for in Law No. 8 (30 November 1945), which became effective on 1 December 1945.

=== Restoration of order into German hands ===
Law No. 4 (30 October 1945) re-established the German court system according to German legislation enacted prior to Hitler's rise to power.

Directive No. 16 (6 November 1945) provided for the equipment of the German police forces with light weapons to combat crime, while the carrying of automatic rifles was prohibited except with special Allied permission.

Law No. 21 (30 March 1946) provided for the establishment of labor courts to resolve labor disputes within the German population. These courts were to be run by German judges.

Gradually, the Allied governments relaxed their control over German political life and on 3 June 1946, the Political Directorate of the Control Council recommended holding municipal elections in the city of Berlin in October of the same year. On 3 August 1946, the council approved a new provisional constitution for the Greater Berlin metropolitan area. Another reform relating to Berlin took place on 22 August 1946, as the council approved a reform plan for the police of Greater Berlin, which assigned four assistants to the Berlin Chief of Police, each to oversee police work in each of the four occupation sectors in that metropolitan area.

=== Denazification and eradication of militarism ===
Law No. 2 (10 October 1945) provided for the total and permanent dissolution of the National Socialist Workers' Party and its revival was totally prohibited. As part of the denazification policy, Directive No. 23 (17 December 1945) prohibited any athletic activities performed as part of military or para-military training, the prohibition to be effective as of 1 January 1946.

Directive No. 24 (12 January 1946) established a set of comprehensive criteria for the removal from public office of those "who have been more than nominal participants in [the Nazi Party's] activities" and provided for their removal from any civil service or work in civil organisation, labor unions, industry, education or the press and any work other than simple labor. The category of persons to which the directive applied was those who held significant positions in the Nazi Party or those who joined prior to 1937, the time when membership became compulsory for German citizens.

In order to eradicate the influence of Nazi literature on the German population, Order No. 4 (13 May 1946) prohibited the publication and dissemination of Nazi or militarist literature and demanded to hand over any existing such literature be handed over to the Allied authorities.

Law No. 31 (1 July 1946) prohibited the German police authorities from conducting any surveillance of political activities by German citizens in the various occupation zones.

Some reforms were symbolic in nature. Law No. 46 (25 February 1947) proclaimed the abolition of Prussia as an administrative unit within Germany, citing past militarism associated with that name as the cause for the change. The Free State of Prussia and the government of Prussia had already been abolished by Hitler in 1934. Some parts of the former territory of Prussia were no longer even populated by Germans, as they had become part of Poland or the Soviet Union after most Germans had been forcibly relocated westward, while the rest of the territory of Prussia was divided among other German states.

Law No. 57 (30 August 1947) dissolved all German insurance companies that were connected with the German Labour Front, established on 1 May 1933.

=== Resettlement of German-speaking minorities residing outside Germany ===
One major issue dealt with by the Control Council was the decision made at the Potsdam Conference regarding the forced removal of German minorities from Czechoslovakia, Hungary and Poland to Allied-occupied Germany. On 20 November 1945, the council approved a plan to that effect to be completed by July 1946. France, not having been a party to the Potsdam conference, reserved the right not to be bound by any agreements made there, and accordingly refused to accept German expellees into the French zone of occupation.

=== Other issues ===
On 10 September 1945, the council issued an appeal to the separate Allied military governors, requesting them to relax trade regulations between the four occupation zones, but this was only a recommendation, as each Allied government maintained the real power on such matters.

On 17 September, the council issued recommendations to the four occupying powers to establish tracing bureaus to assist displaced persons.

On 20 September, the council issued an order prohibiting fraternisation between Allied military personnel and the German population, effective from 1 October, except in cases of marriage or when a military governor decided to billet his soldiers with a German family.

Law No. 5 (30 October 1945) created the German External Property Commission, which was authorised to confiscate any German assets outside of Germany until the Control Council decided how to dispose of them in the interests of peace. The composition of that commission was decided in Directive No. 21 (20 November 1945).

Law No. 7 (30 November 1945) regulated the distribution of electricity and gas in the various occupation zones.

Law No. 9 (promulgated the same day as no. 7) provided for the confiscation of all assets owned by the IG Farben conglomerate.

Law No. 32 (10 July 1946) permitted the German local authorities to employ women in manual labor due to the shortage of manpower. Supplement to Directive No. 14 (13 September 1946) equalised the wages of female and minor workers with male workers.

Law No. 49 (20 March 1947) abrogated the German law of 1933, which governed relations between the German government and the German Evangelical Church, while keeping the independence of that church in internal matters. Law No. 62 (20 February 1948) repealed all Nazi laws regulating the activities of churches in Germany.

== Incapacitation of the council ==
From the outset, France sought to leverage its position on the Allied Control Council to obstruct policies it believed conflicted with its national interests. Charles de Gaulle had not been invited to the Potsdam Conference and accordingly the French did not accept any obligation to abide by the Potsdam Agreement in the proceedings of the Allied Control Council. In particular, they resisted all proposals to establish common policies and institutions across Germany as a whole and anything that they feared might lead to the emergence of an eventual unified German government. For example, France created the Saar Protectorate in Saarland out of its zone, but it was never recognised by the Soviet Union, one member of the occupying ACC.

Relations between the Western Allies (especially the United States and the United Kingdom) and the Soviet Union subsequently deteriorated and so did their cooperation in the administration of occupied Germany. Within each zone, each power ran its own administration:

- the Military Government of the French Zone of Occupation in Germany (Gouvernement Militaire de la Zone Française d'Occupation en Allemagne, GMZFO) in Karlsruhe;
- the Soviet Military Administration in Germany (Russian: Советская военная администрация в Германии, СВАГ; Sovetskaia Voennaia Administratsia v Germanii, SVAG) in East Berlin;
- the Control Commission for Germany – British Element (CCG/BE) in Bad Oeynhausen, and
- the Office of Military Government, United States (OMGUS) in West Berlin and Frankfurt.

In September 1946, disagreement arose regarding the distribution of coal for industry in the four occupation zones and the Soviet representative in the council withdrew his support of the plan agreed upon by the governments of the United States, Britain and France.

Against Soviet protests, the two English-speaking powers pushed for a heightened economic collaboration between the different zones, and on 1 January 1947, the British and American zones merged to form the Bizone. Over the course of 1947 and early 1948, they began to prepare the currency reform that would introduce the Deutsche Mark and ultimately lead to the creation of an independent West German state on 23 May 1949.

When the Soviets learned about these plans, they claimed that they were in violation of the Potsdam Agreement, that obviously the Western powers were not interested in further regular four-power control of Germany and that under such circumstances the Control Council had no further purpose. On 20 March 1948, Marshal Vasily Sokolovsky walked out of the meeting of the council and no further Soviet representative attended until the 1970s, thus in practice incapacitating the council. On 7 October 1949, they established the independent East German state.

== After the breakdown ==
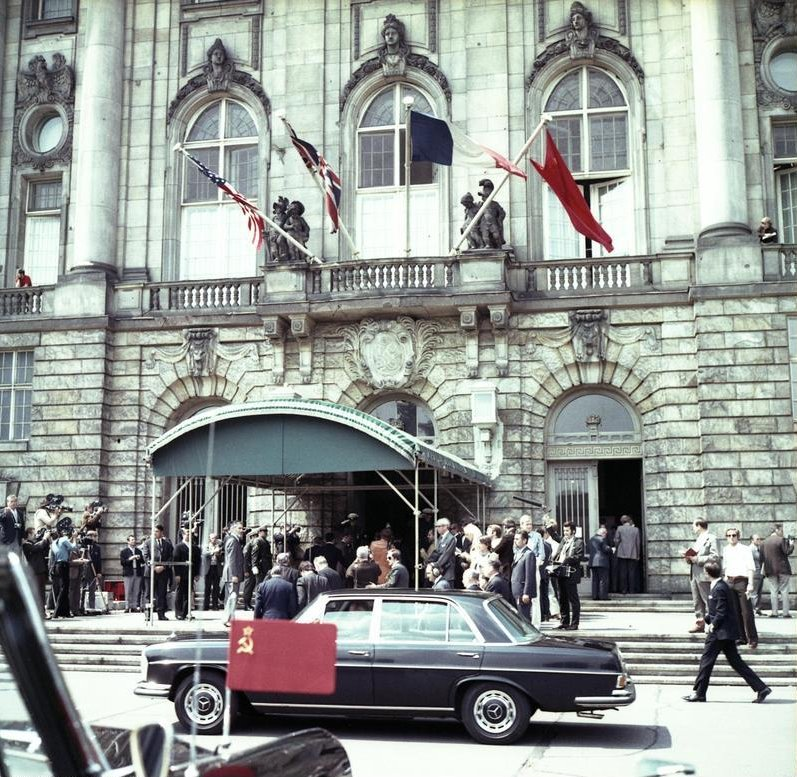
Arrival of the four foreign ministers at the Allied Control Council headquarters building for the signing of the final protocol of the Four Power Agreement on Berlin on 3 June 1972

As the Control Council could act only with the agreement of all four members, this move basically paralysed the institution, while the Cold War reached an early high point during the Soviet blockade of Berlin of 1948–1949. The Allied Control Council was not formally dissolved and the four Allies de jure still worked together in ruling both Germany ("Germany as a whole") and Austria, but ceased all activity until 1971 except the operations of the Four-Power Authorities, namely the management of Spandau Prison (where persons convicted at the Nuremberg Trials were held until 1987) and the Berlin Air Safety Centre.

In 1955, the ACC gave up its power in Austria and the Austrian state became completely independent with the signing of the Austrian Independence Treaty.

The Western powers instituted the Allied High Commission by September 1949; it remained in operation until West Germany gained near-sovereignty in 1955 and approved an interim constitution (still in force today), the Basic Law for the Federal Republic of Germany. In Eastern Germany, the Soviet administration, with its representative of the ACC, was the highest authority; later, this position was converted to a High Commissioner as well, until the German Democratic Republic gained near-sovereignty also in 1955.

In establishing the Allied Control Council as the supreme authority for Germany and the sole legal repository of German national sovereignty, the Allied Powers of 1945 had envisaged that this sovereignty would eventually be passed on to a new German state, once a unified German government adequate for the purpose had been established. The breakdown of the Allied Control Council therefore created a constitutional dilemma for both the nascent Federal Republic and GDR governments, as neither new state could claim formal approval of their constitutions from the full Control Council, and it was unclear how otherwise they might claim legitimate sovereignty over the parts of Germany under their control.

The Allied Control Council met once again on 3 September 1971, leading to the Four Power Agreement on Berlin. During the talks for unification of Germany in late 1989, it was decided to convene the ACC again as a forum for solving the issue of Allied rights and privileges in Germany.

Germany remained under nominal military occupation until 15 March 1991, when the final ratification of the Treaty on the Final Settlement with Respect to Germany (signed on 12 September 1990) was lodged with the German Government. This, as the final peace treaty signed by the four powers and the two German states, formally restored full sovereignty to a reunified Germany. With the ACC giving up its power in Germany and Germany becoming a completely independent and reunited country, the ACC officially dissolved.

The council had held its final meeting on 2 October 1990, on the eve of the reunification of Germany, when it promulgated the formal documents — already agreed in advance — that authorised the inclusion of the city of Berlin in the German reunification. This was necessary because, until then, West Berlin was legally not a part of the Federal Republic of Germany, although it was administered by it. But with the Allied Sovereignty Declaration (Souveränitätserklärung) agreed in the council, the Federal Republic was allowed to assume legal control of Berlin at the moment of German reunification (although the withdrawal of the Allied military presence had to wait until 1994, in accordance with the timeframe provided by the Treaty on the Final Settlement with Respect to Germany).

== The Kammergericht building ==
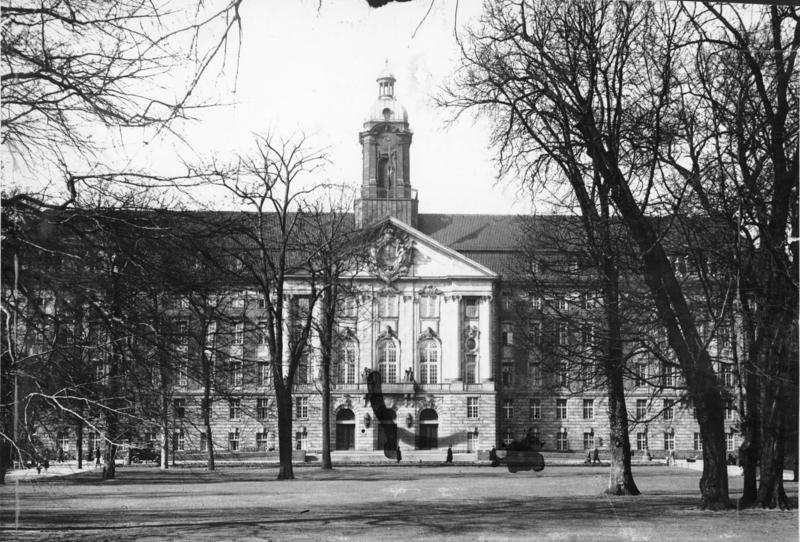
Kammergericht building in 1938 with its tower

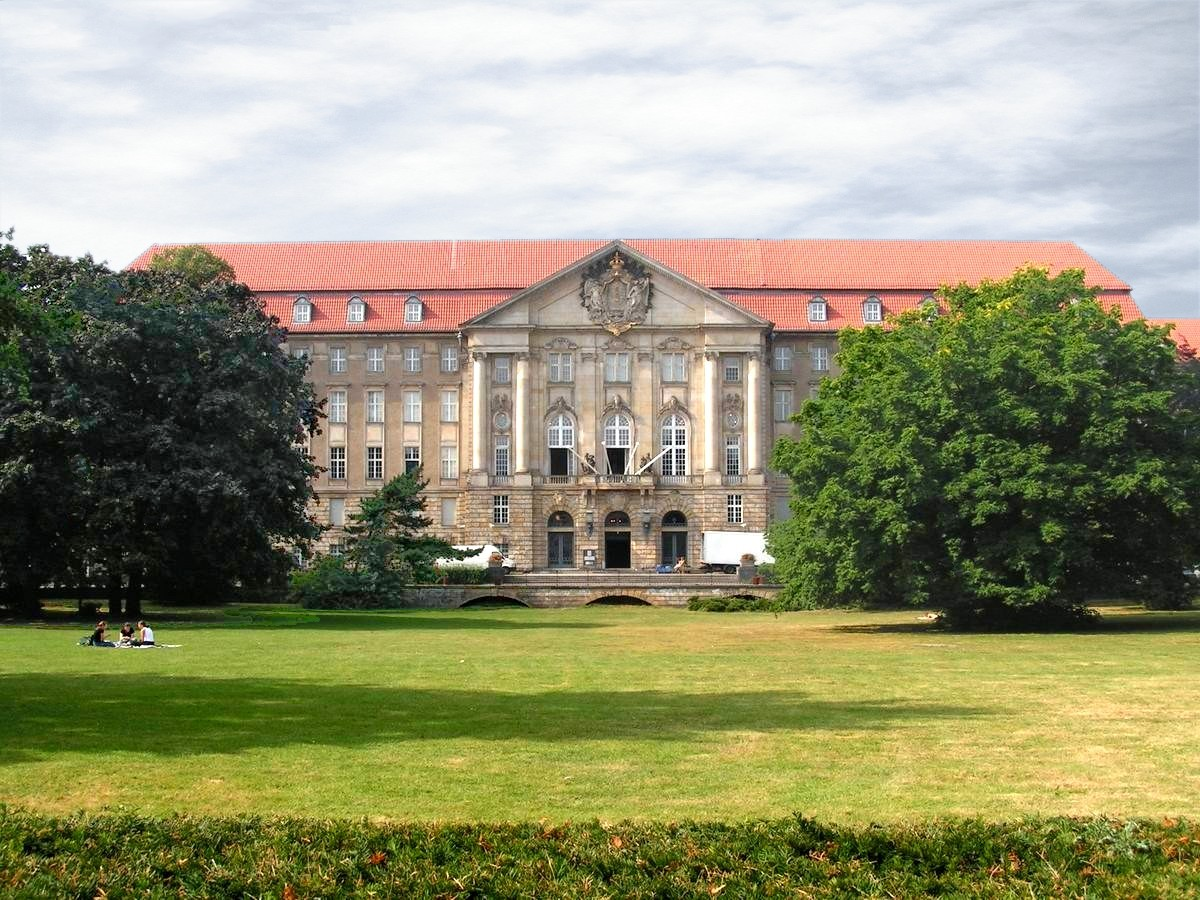
Kammergericht, seat of the court 1913–1945 and since 1997

During its short active life, the Allied Control Council was housed in and operated from the former building of the Kammergericht, the supreme court of the state of Prussia, which is situated in Berlin's Schöneberg locality. The building was infamous as the location of the show-trials of those accused of participation in the 20 July plot held from 7 August 1944 in the plenary chamber of the building.

The building itself had suffered some battle damage, losing a central tower, but had remained mostly usable. After the cessation of most council activity in 1948, all occupying powers quickly withdrew from the building to their respective sectors of the city, leaving the facility cold, empty and dark.

Only one four-power organisation, the Berlin Air Safety Center (BASC), remained in the building from 1945 until 31 December 1990. As a symbol of the BASC's continued presence, the four national flags of the occupying powers still flew over the large front doors every day. The only other signs of occupancy were the few, sparse office lights that emanated from a small corner room of the building — the BASC Operations Room — in the evenings. Of the 550 rooms in the building, the BASC office complex and guards' quarters occupied fewer than forty.

Because of the BASC's presence, the building remained closely guarded by United States military guards, with access granted only to select members of the four powers. This led to mysterious legends and ghost stories about the eerie, dark facility with its grand, granite statuary overlooking the beautiful park.

After the fall of the Berlin Wall and the departure of Russian troops in August 1994 (a withdrawal that took place in accordance with Article 4 of the Two Plus Four Treaty), the building was returned to the German government. In 1997, its erstwhile occupant, the Kammergericht, moved in. It now functions as the supreme court of the state of Berlin.

== See also ==
- Allied-occupied Germany
- Allied Kommandatura
- European Advisory Commission
- History of Germany
- Military occupation
- Far Eastern Commission

== Sources of laws of the Allied Control Council ==
- "The Establishment of the Allied Control Council (5 June 1945)". German History in Documents and Images (GHDI).
  Official documents on the Allied Control Council's establishment.
- Allied Control Authority Germany, Enactments and Approved Papers, 9 volumes (Berlin, 1946–1948), covering the period 1945–1948

== Bibliography ==
- Durie, William (August 2014). "The United States Garrison Berlin 1945–1994". Mission Accomplished. Independent Publisher. ISBN 978-1-63068-540-9.
