= United States Army beef scandal =

Political scandal during the Spanish-American War

The United States Army beef scandal was an American political scandal caused by the widespread distribution of extremely low-quality, heavily adulterated beef products to U.S Army soldiers fighting in the Spanish–American War of 1898. General Nelson Miles called the adulterated meat "embalmed beef," and the scandal became alternatively known as the Embalmed Beef scandal.

== Background ==
The United States Army was poorly prepared for the war. The contract was arranged hurriedly and at the lowest-possible cost by Secretary of War Russell A. Alger from the Chicago "big three" meatpacking corporations Morris & Co, Swift & Co, and Armour & Co. In the atmosphere of pre-regulation-era Chicago, the companies took advantage of Alger's inattention and favorable attitude to the industry (as well as the Army's immediate need for large amounts of cheap beef to provision the expeditionary forces) by further cutting corners and reducing quality on the (already heavily adulterated) product they shipped for the US contract.

== Scandal ==
As a result of the cost cutting measures, most of the meat arriving in Cuba was found to be so poorly preserved, chemically adulterated, or spoiled so that it was toxic and dangerous to consume. In addition, bones and other inedible animal parts were found, causing public outrage. The meat caused an unrecorded number of illnesses and death from dysentery and food poisoning, having an especially deadly effect on the thousands already weakened by the epidemics of malaria and yellow fever which were ravaging the unprotected American troops and would eventually kill twice as many men as combat with the Spanish. Since yellow fever frequently causes symptoms similar to bacterial food poisoning (fever, vomiting, severe or bloody diarrhea), little connection was made at the time between illness and consumption of the Chicago beef. The scandal was first broken by Major W. H. Daly, chief surgeon on the staff of General Nelson Miles, in September 1898.

== Court of inquiry ==
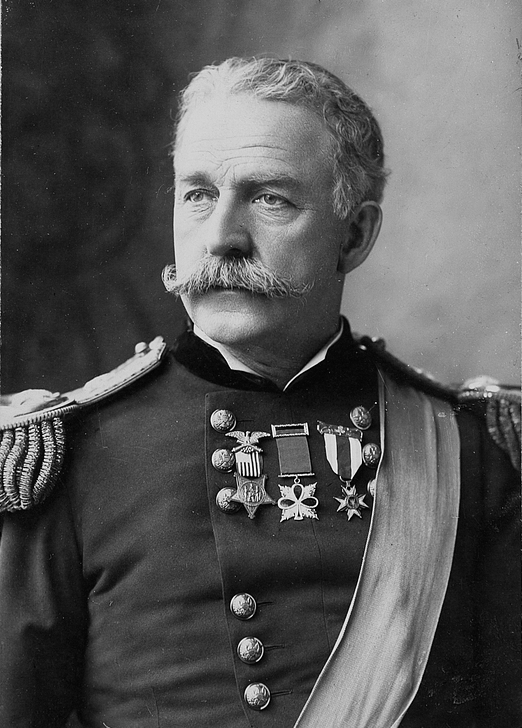
General Nelson A. Miles

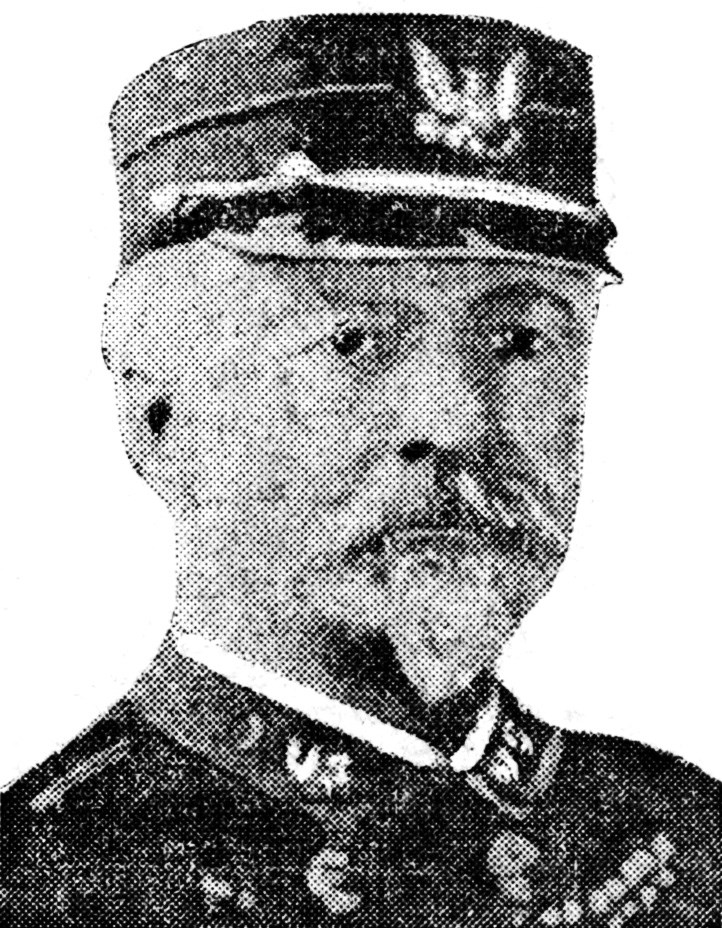
General Charles P. Eagan

In the months following the 1898 Spanish–American War, during a court of inquiry held to investigate problems in the U.S. Army's food quality, As Civil War Union Army veteran, Miles had many years of experience with army provisions. At the onset of the Spanish–American War, he recommended to Alger that local cattle be purchased in Cuba and Puerto Rico for the Army's use, rather than using preserved or refrigerated meat that had been transported from the United States. This would have followed the Army's traditional practice of procuring fresh beef from local sources.

Despite his requests, the Army was dedicated to supporting the Chicago meatpacking industry, which eventually shipped hundreds of tons of refrigerated and canned beef to the Army from the mainland. In his testimony before the court of inquiry, Miles referred to the refrigerated product as "embalmed beef," and provided the court with a letter from an Army medical officer describing the product. "[M]uch of the beef I examined arriving on the transports from the United States ... [was] apparently preserved by injected chemicals to aid deficient refrigeration," the medical officer wrote. "It looked well, but had an odor similar to that of a dead human body after being injected with formaldehyde, and it tasted when first cooked like decomposed boric acid ..."

As for the canned product, Miles reported, during the war he had received many complaints about its poor quality. His officers provided many striking descriptions of it. "The meat ... soon became putrid," wrote one colonel, "and in many of the cans was found in course of putrefaction when opened." An infantry major declared that "'Nasty' is the only term that will fitly describe its appearance. Its use produced diarrhea and dysentery." Another officer noted "It was often nauseating and unfit for use. It should no longer be issued."

Miles also made public statements, reported in the newspapers, claiming that the canned meat was the after-product of the process for making beef extract. "There was no life or nourishment in the meat," charged Miles. "It had been used to make beef extract, and after the juice was squeezed out of it the pulp was put back in the cans and labeled 'roast beef.'" Miles stated "I have the affidavits of men who have seen the process of embalming beef ... treating it chemically for the purpose of preserving it."

While other officers, notably General Wesley Merritt, who had commanded an Army corps in the Philippines during the war, denied having heard of any trouble with the meat supplies, Miles refused to be silenced. When the Commissary General, Brigadier General Charles P. Eagan, was called to testify, he strongly denounced Miles as a liar. This resulted in a court-martial and Eagan's suspension from duty until mandatory retirement age.

== Results ==
Although there were no official findings of large-scale trouble with meat supplies, the newspapers stirred up public opinion on the subject. This contributed to the growing criticism of Alger's handling of the Army during the war (a phenomenon that became known as "Algerism") and by the summer of 1899, President William McKinley decided that Alger had to go. On August 1, Alger resigned at McKinley's request.

The Veterinary Corps' founding on June 3, 1916, was partially sparked due to the medical incompetence displayed in the beef scandal.

== See also ==
- Foodborne illness
- Francis Buzzacott, army scout and writer who testified in support of Miles
- The Jungle, novel and exposé of the poor conditions in the Chicago meatpacking industry
