= Samuel Reber II =

American military officer

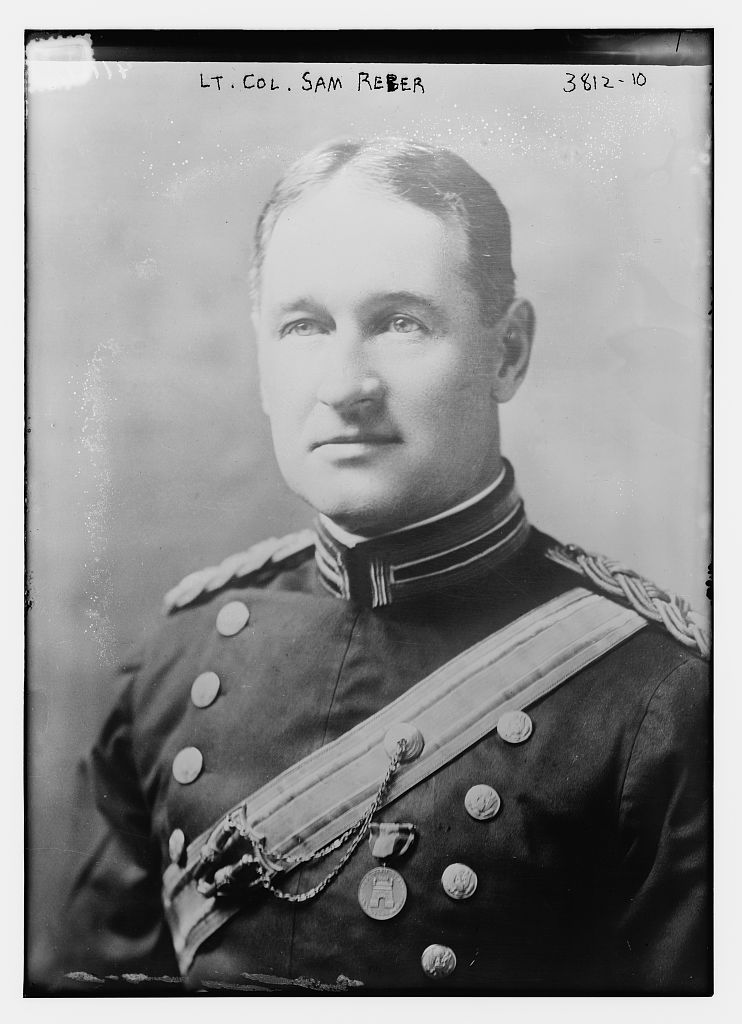
Lt. Col. Samuel Reber circa 1915

Colonel Samuel Reber, Sr. (October 16, 1864 – April 16, 1933) was an aviation pioneer in the Signal Corps.

He was born on October 16, 1864, in Missouri. Reber attended the United States Military Academy and graduated on July 1, 1882. He was promoted to second lieutenant in the 4th Cavalry Regiment on July 1, 1886. John J. Pershing, along with Charles T. Menoher, George B. Duncan, Julius Penn, and several others, were among his classmates. He married Cecilia Sherman Miles, the daughter of General Nelson Appleton Miles and Mary Hoyt Sherman, on January 10, 1900, in Washington, D.C. They had two sons, Miles and Samuel Reber, Jr.

He died on April 16, 1933. He was buried in Arlington National Cemetery on April 16, 1933.
