= Theodore Kaghan =

American dramatist

- Born: July 24, 1912; Boston, Massachusetts, U.S.
- Died: August 9, 1989 (aged 77); Brattleboro, Vermont, U.S.
- Known for: American civil servant, journalist, target of McCarthyism

Theodore Kaghan (July 24, 1912 – August 9, 1989) was an American civil servant and journalist.

== Early years ==
Kaghan was born in Boston on July 24, 1912, and graduated from the University of Michigan.

At the University of Michigan he won several annual prizes given for undergraduate dramatic writing, including the top award in 1935 for a play called Unfinished Picture, later read but not performed by the Group Theatre, named in 1948 as a Communist front organization by the House Un-American Activities Committee. He wrote a one-act play called Hello, Franco that was staged in New York City in January 1938. It depicted a multi-ethnic group of Americans in the Lincoln Brigade. They pretend to use their broken field telephone to talk with friends and family back home as well as with Francisco Franco.

Kaghan worked on the foreign news desk of the New York Herald Tribune beginning in 1939 and moved to the Office of War Information in 1942.

In 1946, he served as editor-in-chief of the Wiener Kurier, Vienna's official anti-Communist publication. From 1945 to 1950 he was Director of American Publications for the U.S. Army forces then occupying Austria.

Kaghan served from 1950 to 1953 as deputy director of Public Affairs for the United States High Commission in Germany, with indirect responsibility for all of the commission's newspapers and radios stations in Germany. When Roy Cohn and David Schine, two investigators for Senator Joseph McCarthy's Senate Permanent Investigations Subcommittee, toured Europe early in 1953, Kaghan called them "junketeering gumshoes." When Cohn called him a security risk, Kaghan said he would welcome a chance to testify before McCarthy's committee. He also said that when the two "have made half the record I have in the field of psychological warfare against communism, then perhaps the money this trip of theirs is costing the American taxpayer might begin to pay off." And he offered to show McCarthy his record fighting communism "here in Europe, where the threat is an everyday reality rather than an excuse for creating political confusion."

== Resignation ==
In April 1953, he was called home to testify before the subcommittee. He admitted that in the 1930s he had held radical views and did not recognize the threat Communism posed to the United States, but said that his views had long since changed. The Senators questioned him about plays he wrote around 1930, a possible Communist he shared an apartment with between 1935 and 1940, and other issues. McCarthy read passages from his plays and Kaghan called some of the passages "long-winded" and "corny." He denied Communist Party membership at any time, but supposed he had attended social gatherings organized by his roommate without realizing the political nature of the events. When McCarthy asked for the names of those who visited the apartment, Kaghan said he thought it "un-American" to provide them based on so little grounds for suspecting them of wrongdoing. Kaghan described his conversion to anti-Communism, beginning with suspicions in 1939 and ending with firm belief in 1945 when he took up his State Department assignment in Vienna.

To support his testimony, Kaghan offered the committee a letter from Leopold Figl, a prominent anti-Communist politician and first Federal Chancellor of Austria after the Second World War. During the hearing, another cable arrived in support from Ernst Reuter, the Mayor of Berlin. At one point in the hearing, when Senator McCarthy was unable to remember how Kaghan had characterized Cohn and Schine, Kaghan supplied the answer: "'junketeering gumshoes', sir." He explained why he took an interest in their visit: "It is my duty to uphold the positions and conduct of the American Government. These investigators had cast reflections on the American Senate. There was a raft of cartoons and dispatches in the German press that were hurting American prestige. I felt that it was time I became interested in it."

Following Kaghan's testimony, Robert L. Johnson, the new head of the International Information Administration (IIA), commonly known as the Voice of America, launched a review of the security clearances of several dozen officials in his department, including Kaghan. After discussions with the State Department, Kaghan resigned from his post on May 11, 1953. Friends reported he was pressured to resign. Newspapers described it as a "forced resignation."

Kaghan returned to Bonn and there described the State Department's role in his resignation. He said the department had asked him to resign before he completed his subcommittee testimony and that its security investigator Scott McLeod gave personnel orders to the IIA. Expecting to be dismissed, he resigned in order to be able to return to Bonn to bring his wife and children home. He described his Washington experience as "disillusioning," and explained: "When you cross swords openly with Senator McCarthy, you cannot expect to remain in the State Department, even though you have, as I do, loyalty and security clearance and an anti-Communist record reaching from Vienna to Berlin." A week later Raymond Swing resigned his position as senior analyst for the Voice of America to protest what he called the State Department's "spineless failure ... to stand by its own staff."

On May 29, more than 200 members of the U.S. High Commission, including Commissioner James B. Conant and Deputy Commissioner Samuel Reber, attended a farewell party for Kaghan in Bonn, where Kaghan gave a speech that was "constantly interrupted by applause."

== Later years ==
In October 1954, Kaghan congratulated Time magazine when it reported that McCarthy's investigations had "hurt his country's chances to rally the peoples of Europe against Communism." He referred to his State Department superiors as "the schizoid psychological warriors of Foggy Bottom."

The State Department later cleared him of the allegations.

He joined the New York Post as United Nations correspondent and then as a foreign affairs columnist. From January 1967 to September 1973, he was Director of Public Information in Rome for the Food and Agriculture Organization of the United Nations. He worked for a Manhattan public relations firm until retiring in 1975.

Kaghan died of heart failure on August 9, 1989, at Memorial Hospital in Brattleboro, Vermont, survived by his wife Nancy, a son Benjamin, and a daughter Susan.

== Sources ==
- Theodore Kaghan, "The McCarthyization of Theodore Kaghan," The Reporter, no. 9 (July 21, 1963), 17–25
