= Charles P. Eagan =

United States Army general (1841–1919)

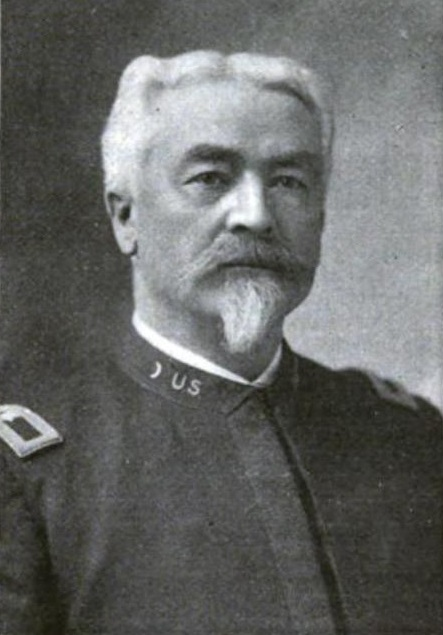
- From First Quarter 1899's Cyclopedic Review of Current History
- Born: Charles Patrick Eagan; January 16, 1841; Ireland
- Died: February 1, 1919 (aged 78); The Bronx, New York, U.S.
- Burial place: Arlington National Cemetery
- Military career
- Allegiance: Union; United States
- Branch: Union Army; United States Army
- Service years: 1862–1865 (Union Army); 1865–1900 (U.S. Army)
- Rank: Brigadier General
- Commands: Commissary General of the U.S. Army
- Wars: American Civil War; American Indian Wars; Spanish–American War
- Other work: Real estate speculator Mine operator

Charles Patrick Eagan (January 16, 1841 – February 1, 1919) was a career United States Army officer who gained notoriety as a Commissary General who testified during the United States Army beef scandal of the Spanish–American War. Eagan was born in Ireland and emigrated to the United States sometime prior to 1862.

== Military career ==
Eagan was commissioned as a 1st lieutenant in the 1st Washington Territory Infantry Regiment on June 21, 1862, during the American Civil War. He was honorably mustered out of volunteer service on April 1, 1865. After the war, he joined the Military Order of the Loyal Legion of the United States, a military society of officers who had served the Union during the Civil War.

Eagan was commissioned as a 2nd lieutenant in the 9th Infantry Regiment of the Regular Army on August 30, 1866. He was promoted to 1st lieutenant on January 2, 1869. He was reassigned to the 12th Infantry on June 14, 1869, and promoted to captain and assigned as a commissary of subsistence on June 23, 1874. (Commissaries of subsistence were responsible for providing food supplies to units of the Army.) He received a retroactive brevet (honorary promotion) to the rank of captain on February 27, 1890, for "gallant service in action against hostile Indians in the Lava Beds, California on April 17, 1873". Eagan was promoted to major on March 12, 1892, and promoted to lieutenant colonel and assistant commissary general of subsistence on January 26, 1897. He was promoted to colonel on March 11, 1898. The Spanish–American War began in April 1898 and on 3 May Eagan succeeded William H. Nash as Commissary General with the rank of brigadier general.

== Embalmed Beef Scandal ==
One of the challenges facing Eagan was supplying food to soldiers serving in Cuba and other remote locations. Eagan's solution was to ship both refrigerated and canned beef to the soldiers. Unfortunately, the suppliers of the beef (which were the major Chicago based meat packing companies) provided beef of inferior quality treated with preservatives, compounded by the fact that the canning process had yet to be perfected, so that the vast majority of the beef supplied overseas was inedible when it was received. Soldiers who ate the beef were afflicted with diarrhea and dysentery. This was widely reported in the press, created great embarrassment for the Army and resulted in a Congressional investigation.

In testimony before Congress in December 1898, the refrigerated beef was derisively referred to as "embalmed beef" (due to its odor) by the then Commanding General of the Army, Major General Nelson A. Miles. General Miles also testified that the canned beef was supplied to the Army under the "pretense of an experiment". General Eagan took this statement as a personal insult and openly denounced Miles as a liar when called to testify on January 12, 1899.

General Eagan was quoted in The New York Times as saying, in reference to Miles, "he lies in his throat, he lies in his heart, he lies with every hair on his head and every pore on his body, he lies willfully, deliberately, intentionally, and maliciously." Eagan also said of Miles, "he should be denounced by every honest man, barred from the clubs, barred from the society of decent people, and so ostracized that the street bootblack would not condescend to speak to him", also calling him a "prodigious liar ".

As a result of Eagan's aspersions towards Miles, who had a long and distinguished military career as well as being a recipient of the Medal of Honor, he was quickly court-martialed for "conduct unbecoming an officer and a gentleman" and was suspended from duty until he retired on December 6, 1900.

As a direct result of General Eagan's remarks concerning General Miles, he was denied admission into the Pennsylvania Commandery of the Military Order of Foreign Wars. He was also expelled from membership in the District of Columbia Commandery of the Military Order of the Loyal Legion of the United States.

== Later life and death ==
After his retirement from the Army, Eagan pursued real estate and mining interests in Mexico. After a protracted struggle with other speculators, in May 1902, Eagan won a case in the Mexican Federal Court which granted him ownership of 2,500,000 acres in western Mexico.

General Eagan died of heart disease in the Bronx, New York, on February 1, 1919, at the age of 78.

== Awards ==
- Civil War Campaign Medal
- Indian Campaign Medal
- Spanish War Service Medal
