= List of administrators of Allied-occupied Germany =

Allied occupation zones in Germany, 1945–1949. The territories east of the Oder–Neisse line (under Polish and Soviet administration/annexation), as well as the detached Saar Protectorate (under French protection), are shown in cream. Bremen was an American enclave within the British zone. Berlin was a four-power area within the Soviet zone.

This article lists the administrators of Allied-occupied Germany, which represented the Allies of World War II in Allied-occupied Germany (German: Alliierten-besetztes Deutschland) from the end of World War II in Europe in 1945 until the establishment of West Germany, officially the Federal Republic of Germany (FRG; German: Bundesrepublik Deutschland) and East Germany, officially the German Democratic Republic (GDR; German: Deutsche Demokratische Republik, DDR) in 1949.

== Officeholders ==
=== American zone ===
Military governors

No.	Portrait	Governor	Took office	Left office	Time in office	Defence branch
1	Dwight D. Eisenhower	General of the Army; Dwight D. Eisenhower (1890–1969)	8 May 1945	10 November 1945	186 days	United States Army
–	George S. Patton	General; George S. Patton (1885–1945); Acting	11 November 1945	25 November 1945	14 days	United States Army
2	Joseph T. McNarney	General; Joseph T. McNarney (1893–1972)	26 November 1945	5 January 1947	1 year, 40 days	United States Air Force
3	Lucius D. Clay	General; Lucius D. Clay (1898–1978)	6 January 1947	14 May 1949	2 years, 128 days	United States Army
–	Clarence R. Huebner	Lieutenant general Clarence R. Huebner (1888–1972); Acting	15 May 1949	21 September 1949	129 days	United States Army

High Commissioners

No.	Portrait	High Commissioner	Took office	Left office	Time in office
1	John J. McCloy	John J. McCloy (1895–1989)	21 September 1949	1 August 1952	2 years, 315 days
2	Walter J. Donnelly	Walter J. Donnelly (1896–1970)	1 August 1952	11 December 1952	132 days
–	Samuel Reber	Samuel Reber (1903–1971); Acting	11 December 1952	10 February 1953	61 days
3	James B. Conant	James B. Conant (1893–1978)	10 February 1953	5 May 1955	2 years, 84 days

=== British zone ===
Military governors

No.	Portrait	Governor	Took office	Left office	Time in office	Defence branch
1	Bernard Montgomery	Field marshal Bernard Montgomery (1887–1976) (Note: From 1 January 1946, Bernard Montgomery, Viscount Montgomery of Alamein.)	22 May 1945	30 April 1946	343 days	British Army
2	Sir Sholto Douglas	Air chief marshal Sir Sholto Douglas (1893–1969)	1 May 1946	31 October 1947	1 year, 183 days	Royal Air Force
3	Sir Brian Robertson	General; Sir Brian Robertson (1896–1974)	1 November 1947	21 September 1949	1 year, 324 days	British Army

High Commissioners

No.	Portrait	High Commissioner	Took office	Left office	Time in office	Defence branch
1	Sir Brian Robertson	General; Sir Brian Robertson (1896–1974)	21 September 1949	24 June 1950	276 days	British Army
2	Sir Ivone Kirkpatrick	Sir Ivone Kirkpatrick (1897–1964)	24 June 1950	29 September 1953	3 years, 97 days	none
3	Sir Frederick Millar	Sir Frederick Millar (1900–1989)	29 September 1953	5 May 1955	1 year, 218 days	none

=== French zone ===
Military commander

No.	Portrait	Commander	Took office	Left office	Time in office	Defence branch
1	Jean de Lattre de Tassigny	Army general Jean de Lattre de Tassigny (1889–1952)	8 May 1945	July 1945	1 month	French Army

Military governor

No.	Portrait	Governor	Took office	Left office	Time in office	Defence branch
1	Marie-Pierre Kœnig	Army general Marie-Pierre Kœnig (1898–1970)	July 1945	21 September 1949	4 years, 2 months	French Army

High Commissioner

No.	Portrait	High Commissioner	Took office	Left office	Time in office
1	André François-Poncet	André François-Poncet (1887–1978)	21 September 1949	5 May 1955	5 years, 226 days

=== Soviet zone ===
Military commanders

No.	Portrait	Commander	Took office	Left office	Time in office	Defence branch
N/A	Georgy Zhukov	Marshal of the Soviet Union; Georgy Zhukov (1896–1974); Commander of the 1st Belorussian Front (in Brandenburg and Berlin)	April 1945	9 June 1945	2 months	Soviet Army
N/A	Konstantin Rokossovsky	Marshal of the Soviet Union; Konstantin Rokossovsky (1896–1968); Commander of the 2nd Belorussian Front (in Mecklenburg)	April 1945	9 June 1945	2 months	Soviet Army
N/A	Ivan Konev	Marshal of the Soviet Union; Ivan Konev (1897–1973); Commander of the 1st Ukrainian Front (in Saxony)	April 1945	9 June 1945	2 months	Soviet Army

Chief Administrators of the Soviet Military Administration

No.	Portrait	Chief Administrator	Took office	Left office	Time in office	Defence branch
1	Georgy Zhukov	Marshal of the Soviet Union; Georgy Zhukov (1896–1974)	9 June 1945	10 April 1946	305 days	Soviet Army
2	Vasily Sokolovsky	Marshal of the Soviet Union; Vasily Sokolovsky (1897–1968)	10 April 1946	29 March 1949	2 years, 353 days	Soviet Army
3	Vasily Chuikov	Army general Vasily Chuikov (1900–1982)	29 March 1949	10 October 1949	195 days	Soviet Army

Chairman of the Soviet Control Commission

No.	Portrait	Chairman	Took office	Left office	Time in office	Defence branch
1	Vasily Chuikov	Army general Vasily Chuikov (1900–1982)	10 October 1949	28 May 1953	3 years, 230 days	Soviet Army

High Commissioners

No.	Portrait	High Commissioner	Took office	Left office	Time in office
1	Vladimir Semyonov	Vladimir Semyonov (1911–1992)	28 May 1953	16 July 1954	1 year, 49 days
2	Georgy Pushkin	Georgy Pushkin (1909–1963)	16 July 1954	20 September 1955	1 year, 66 days

== See also ==
- History of Germany (1945–1990)
- History of Berlin § West and East Germany (1945–1990)
  - List of commandants of Berlin Sectors
