= Samuel Reber =

American diplomat (1903–1971)

Samuel Reber III
- Born: July 15, 1903; East Hampton, New York
- Died: December 25, 1971 (aged 68); Princeton, New Jersey
- Known for: U.S. diplomat, target of McCarthyism

Samuel Reber III (July 15, 1903 – December 25, 1971) was a diplomat who spent 27 years in the Foreign Service of the United States, including several years with the Allied High Commission for Germany. Threats by Senator Joseph McCarthy to reveal a homosexual incident in his past forced him to resign quietly from the State Department in 1953. McCarthy later publicly alleged that Reber had been forced to retire because he posed a "security risk."

== Family ==
He was born on July 15, 1903, in East Hampton, New York, to a military family. His father, U.S. Army Signal Corps Colonel Samuel Reber II (1864–1933), was an 1886 graduate of West Point, and his mother Cecelia Sherman Miles (1869–1952) was the daughter of Lieutenant General Nelson A. Miles. He attended Groton School and graduated from Harvard University in 1925, where he rowed on the eight-man crew.

== Career ==
Reber joined the Foreign Service in May 1926 and the next year took up his first overseas assignment as Vice Consul in Lima, Peru. During a troubled period for the government of Liberia during which Western powers pressured it to prohibit slavery, contract labor, and the sale of children, Reber joined the U.S. embassy in Monrovia, Liberia, as secretary and consul, and later chargé d'affaires from July 1929 to February 1931. When the Liberian government agreed to accept advice and oversight from the League of Nations, Reber served as the U.S. representative on the League's commission.

He became third secretary of the U.S. delegation to the General Disarmament Conference in Geneva beginning in February 1932. In 1935 and 1936, he served as technical adviser to the U.S. delegation at the London Naval Conference 1935. He was next secretary of the U.S. embassy in Rome and then returned to the U.S. for three years.

He went overseas again for a short assignment in Martinique, then in control of Vichy France, to seek guarantees that French possessions, ships, and planes in the Caribbean would not be used by the Axis powers. The French agreed to disarm their ships and the U.S. used these negotiations to underscore Pierre Laval's weakness as head of the Vichy government and gain advantages from Vichy's need to avoid direct conflict with the U.S.

In 1942, Reber was temporarily assigned to the Office of Foreign Territories, under the State Department's European Division, where he worked with Charles W. Yost.

Reber next joined the Allied Military Mission to Italy and then the Allied Control Commission in Italy. He undertook a special mission to North Africa in 1943 on behalf of President Franklin D. Roosevelt. In 1944, he went to Europe as the U.S. representative to the new French government with the rank of minister, and then to London.

He became a political officer on the staff of the Supreme Headquarters of the Allies in Paris. In 1946 he was political adviser to the U.S. delegation to the Council of Foreign Ministers Conference in Paris and the next year was director of the State Department's Office of European Affairs.

Reber represented the State Department in negotiations among deputy foreign ministers for an Austrian peace treaty in the years following World War II. There, according to Life, he "endured two years of Soviet insult and frustration." At one point he moved that the talks be suspended because of Russia's demands for control of Austrian oil industry resources. According to the New York Times, he "played a major role in shaping the Austrian Government."

Reber joined the staff of the Allied High Commission as a political adviser to John J. McCloy, U.S. High Commissioner for Germany, in May 1950. He served in the post of U.S. Acting High Commissioner for Germany from December 11, 1952, to February 10, 1953. In this position he shared confidences with Konrad Adenauer during ongoing negotiations about the formation of a European Defense Community. He shared his critical assessment of Winston Churchill's 1953 thoughts of an alliance of Great Britain, the U.S., West Germany, and Spain: "The grand old man had apparently again drunk too much whiskey and felt himself back in the time of his ancestor, the Duke of Marlborough!" He later served as Deputy High Commissioner. In the spring of 1953, Roy Cohn and David Schine visited several German cities as investigators for the Senate Permanent Subcommittee on Investigations. Reber provided them with an aide to make travel arrangements, but he refused to support them when they denounced Theodore Kaghan, Deputy Director of the Public Affairs Division for the High Commissioner's office, for his radical past.

== Resignation ==
Reber announced his retirement in May 1953, effective in July when he turned 50, just days after attending a party honoring a retiring senior official with the Commission, Theodore Kaghan, who resigned after testifying before Senator Joseph McCarthy's Senate Investigation Committee. Kaghan had mocked two of McCarthy's staff members, Roy Cohn and David Schine, as "junketeering gumshoes" when they toured Europe to investigate un-American publications held in the libraries of the United States Information Service.

As part of the investigation of security risks in the upper echelons of the State Department prompted by McCarthy's charges of disloyalty and homosexuality, Reber was subjected to security interviews and a polygraph test on March 17 and 19, 1953. A senior investigator notified Secretary of State John Foster Dulles that "Reber has made a lot of admissions" about homosexuality. The polygraph operator determined that Reber had never had sexual relations with other State Department personnel, so he was not asked to name others. The rationale for his forced resignation became widely known within diplomatic circles and helped intimidate others. Arthur Schlesinger, Jr., wrote to Adlai Stevenson that "The most eminent recent victim is, of all people, Samel Reber, who apparently is being forced out on a vague homosexual allegation, fifteen years old. And the thing is reaching the point where, as John Davies told me, the very fact of accusation makes a man, in the eyes of these thugs, a future risk....As some one said, we have passed beyond the Kafka phase, and are moving into Dostoievsky."

In April 1954, Reber's older brother, Major General Miles Reber, a West Point graduate, testified on the first day of the Army–McCarthy hearings. He had served as Chief of Army legislative liaison and then become commanding general of the Western Area Command in Europe. He thought McCarthy's attempt to influence the Army's assignment of Schine was unremarkable, but of Cohn's insistent phone calls he said here was "no instance under which I was put under greater pressure." McCarthy responded by charging that Samuel Reber had attacked Cohn and Schine repeatedly and had them followed on their 1953 European investigation. The General denied any knowledge of such activity and said it would not have influenced him. McCarthy asked: "Are you aware of the fact that your brother was allowed to resign when charges that he was a bad security risk were made against him as a result of the investigation of this committee?" Senators objected. Time reported: "General Reber sat in silence, gripping the edges of the witness table until his knuckles showed white. Finally, McCarthy, having made his point over radio and television, dismissed the entire question as unimportant, and grandly said he would withdraw it." Eventually the General replied: "As I understand my brother's case, he retired, as he is entitled to do by law, upon reaching the age of 50....I know nothing about any security case involving him."

== Later years ==
Reber later served as Executive Secretary of Goethe Haus in New York City. In 1958, the Federal Republic of Germany awarded him its Knight Commander's Cross of the Order of Merit.

Reber died in Princeton, New Jersey, on December 25, 1971.

Reber never married. His brother Major General Miles Reber survived him.
