= 1999 Swiss referendums =

Ten referendums were held in Switzerland during 1999. The first four were held on 7 February on changes to the eligibility for membership of the Federal Council (approved), constitutional regulations on organ transplantation (approved), a popular initiative "house ownership for everyone" (rejected) and an amendment to the federal law on spatial planning (approved). The fifth was held on 18 April on a new Swiss Federal Constitution, which was approved.

The last five referendums were held on 13 June on the asylum law (approved), on a federal resolution on asylum and foreigners (approved), a federal resolution on the medical prescription of heroin (approved), federal laws on disability and maternity insurance (both rejected).

== Background ==
=== New constitution ===
The proposed new constitution would sever the link between gold and the Swiss franc, which had been required by the old constitution.

The Swiss National Bank was the last central bank to hold substantial gold reserves to back its currency. The 2590 tonnes of gold provided 40% of the value of the franc.

== Results ==
Month	Question	For		Against		Blank/invalid		Total	Registered voters	Turnout	Cantons for		Cantons against	
Month	Question	Votes	%	Votes	%	Blank	Invalid	Total	Registered voters	Turnout	Full	Half	Full	Half
February	Federal Council membership eligibility	1,287,081	74.7	436,511	25.3	34,504	5,457	1,764,453	4,641,615	38.0	18	6	2	0
February	Organ transplantation regulations	1,501,925	87.8	209,263	12.2	46,216	5,471	1,762,875	4,641,615	38.0	20	6	0	0
February	House ownership for everyone	721,717	41.3	1,025,025	58.7	19,817	5,410	1,771,969	4,641,615	38.2	3	0	17	6
February	Spatial planning law amendment	952,482	55.9	750,130	44.1	53,715	5,699	1,762,026	4,641,615	38.0				
April	New constitution	969,310	59.2	669,158	40.8	23,335	5,066	1,666,869	4,642,854	35.9	12	2	8	4
June	Asylum law	1,443,137	70.6	601,389	29.4	66,156	7,282	2,117,964	4,646,362	45.6				
June	Federal resolution on foreigners and asylum	1,447,984	70.8	595,908	29.2	68,695	7,125	2,119,712	4,646,362	45.6				
June	Medical prescription of heroin	1,128,393	54.4	944,919	45.6	45,297	6,760	2,125,369	4,646,362	45.7				
June	Federal law on disability insurance	620,797	30.3	1,428,986	69.7	63,774	7,102	2,120,659	4,646,362	45.6				
June	Federal law on maternity insurance	822,458	39.0	1,286,824	61.0	19,146	6,456	2,134,884	4,646,362	45.9				
Source: Nohlen

== Aftermath ==
The new constitution approved in April made the franc fully fiat, and the Swiss National Bank began selling its gold reserves. Some of the proceeds were used to set up a "solidarity fund" with developing nations. By November, the gold stockpile was reduced to 25%.
