= Calvin B. Hoover =

American economist

Calvin Bryce Hoover
- Calvin Bryce Hoover
- Born: April 14, 1897; Berwick, Illinois
- Died: June 23, 1974 (aged 77); Durham, North Carolina
- Known for: Economics, Consulting

Academic background
- Education: Monmouth College, University of Wisconsin–Madison

Academic work
- Discipline: Comparative economic systems
- Institutions: University of Minnesota; Duke University

Calvin Bryce Hoover (April 14, 1897 – June 23, 1974) was a noted economist and professor. He spent 1929–1930 in Moscow and wrote The Economic Life of Soviet Russia in 1931. Following his travels to Soviet Russia he also traveled to and researched the economies of Germany, Italy, France, Poland, Czechoslovakia, Denmark, Sweden, Norway, and Australia. He is considered the founder of the field of comparative economic systems.

== Early life and pre-war education ==
Hoover was born in Berwick, Illinois, to John Calvin Hoover and Margaret Delilah Roadcap Hoover. Growing up poor, he worked with his father on the railroad and on their tenant farm during breaks from school. He described his early economic and political beliefs as a sort of "primitive socialism," which he came to after noticing the inequities of income in Berwick. His father also read the newspaper The Appeal to Reason, which further fostered his left-leaning ideas. Hoover was an avid reader of history and literature, and compared to the world in his books he saw his small hometown as boring. Looking back on his youth, he once wrote "I wanted to see far places and to have the adventures which both historians and novelists agreed had happened to me through the ages."

Furthermore, coming of age in the early twentieth century, Hoover felt that he had been born too late, "into an age in which nothing ever happened," and had missed the tumultuous adventures of the American frontier. This feeling was exacerbated by visits from his uncles, who had served in the Confederate Army during the American Civil War.

Hoover's family valued education, and since Berwick, Illinois did not have a high school, they sent him and his sister to high school in the city of Monmouth, Illinois, the county seat, 12 miles away. Given his family's lack of economic means, sending two children to high school was a difficult task, for two reasons. First, it was difficult to find transportation through twelve miles or rural Illinois (in the winter it could be impossible), and he and his sister used various methods before finally taking jobs as servants in Monmouth. Second, the local high school charged tuition for students whose families did not live in Monmouth.

Hoover enrolled in Monmouth College in the Fall of 1914. He was an ardent supporter of the allied cause in World War I and, as a result, felt obliged to join the fight when the United States entered the war. Consequently, he left school in 1917. This angered his father who told him, "I remember the young men who enlisted in the Confederate Army when I was a boy in the Shenandoah Valley. They never came back. Some who waited to be conscripted did survive. If you will wait until you are drafted, I won't complain."

== World War I ==
Hoover began his Army career as an infantry private in the Illinois National Guard. His infantry regiment, however, was quickly converted into the 123rd Field Artillery regiment. Hoover received numerous promotions and eventually became a non-commissioned sergeant. He fought in the battles of Saint-Mihiel and Meuse-Argonne. After the war he served in Luxembourg, with the American Army of Occupation in Germany. Of his military service he said, "My army experience cured me of being a socialist."

== Education ==
After his military service, Hoover returned to Monmouth College. He received an A.B. degree in 1922. Later that year, he began graduate work at the University of Wisconsin–Madison and studied under noted professor John R. Commons. In 1923, he accepted a position at the University of Minnesota while he finished his doctoral work at Wisconsin. In 1925, he left Minnesota and accepted the position of assistant professor of economics at Duke University.

== Travel to Russia ==
In 1927 he was awarded a grant by the Social Science Research Council to study the Soviet banking system. Despite this limited scope, he desired to make a more complete study of the Soviet economy. He spent 1929–1930 in Moscow researching the planned economy. He found that despite several limitations, the Soviet economy was capable of consistent growth. Upon his return he was encouraged by distinguished economist John Maynard Keynes to publish his findings. In 1931, he published an in-depth account called The Economic Life of Soviet Russia.

== Travel to Nazi Germany ==
Hoover went to Germany from 1932 to 1933 and witnessed the rise of Adolf Hitler and the Nazis. He found that Hitler's rearmament was revitalizing the German economy; reducing unemployment, improving standard of living, and stemming inflation. This was contrary to conventional thought of the day that insisted that a leader must choose between "guns and butter." He published his second book Germany Enters the Third Reich in 1933. This book sought to alert his fellow Americans to the imminent threat to the peace of Europe posed by Hitler, at a time when there was widespread reluctance to take that danger seriously.

== Work for U.S. Government ==
In 1933 he returned to his post at Duke University. Later that year he was called into government service, where he would spend many of his next twelve years.

=== Agriculture Adjustment Administration (AAA) ===
Hoover arrived in Washington, D.C. in 1933 at the request of Assistant Secretary of Agriculture Rexford Guy Tugwell. He became the economic consultant to the Agricultural Adjustment Administration. The AAA's goal was to raise farm prices. By 1935 he was promoted to consumers' counsel to the AAA.

=== Office of Strategic Services (OSS) ===
Due to his knowledge of the Soviet Union and Nazi Germany he was called into service for the Office of Strategic Services (OSS) at the outbreak of World War II. Hoover served many roles for the OSS, eventually becoming head of Northern European operations in Sweden. His group was instrumental in finding German synthetic oil plants, which led to their bombing and destruction. This grounded the Luftwaffe allowing for the Normandy Invasion.

=== The German Postwar Economy ===
After the end of World War II he was called to Berlin to oversee the German postwar economy. He was the architect of a proposal to restore German industry. Restoration was opposed by many in the United States and the Soviet Union. Many wished instead to continue the deindustrialization of Germany to a degree where she would be unable to wage war ever again. Hoover argued instead that a strong, stable German economy would help to preserve the peace.

== Later life ==
In late 1945 he returned to Duke University, where he was named James B. Duke Professor of Economics.

In 1947 he was awarded the Medal of Freedom by President Harry S. Truman.

In 1953, he was elected president of the American Economic Association. Hoover also served as the president of the Comparative Economics Association; the Southern Economic Association; and was elected a Fellow of the Royal Economic Society.

He continued to teach at Duke until his retirement in 1966.

== Published works ==
- The Economic Life of Soviet Russia. New York, The Macmillan Company, 1931.
- Germany Enters the Third Reich. New York, The Macmillan Company, 1933.
- International Trade and Domestic Employment. New York, London, McGraw-Hill Book Company, 1945.
- Economic Resources and Policies of the South. New York, The Macmillan Company, 1951.
- The Economy, Liberty, and the State. New York, Twentieth Century Fund, 1959.
- Economic Systems of the Commonwealth. Durham, North Carolina, Duke University Press, 1962.
- Memoirs of Capitalism, Communism, and Nazism. Durham, North Carolina, Duke University Press, 1965.

== See also ==
- A Report on Germany
- Industrial plans for Germany
- Restatement of Policy on Germany
- The President's Economic Mission to Germany and Austria
