= Morgenthau Plan =

Post-World War II demilitarization plan for Germany

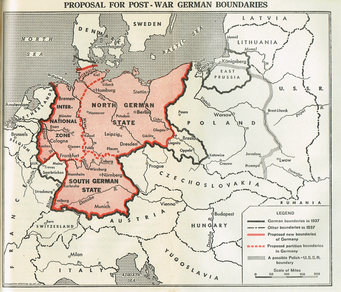
Morgenthau's proposal for the partition of Germany from his 1945 book Germany is Our Problem

Map of the 1944 Morgenthau Plan, which would have seen Germany fully deindustrialize and demilitarize.

The Morgenthau Plan was a proposal to weaken Germany following World War II by eliminating its arms industry and civilian industry. This included the removal or destruction of all military and civilian production plants and equipment across the former Reich, as well as the deportation of millions of Germans to various labour camps across the allied territories. It was first proposed by United States secretary of the treasury Henry Morgenthau Jr. in a 1944 memorandum entitled Suggested Post-Surrender Program for Germany.

While the Morgenthau Plan had some influence until 10 July 1947 (adoption of JCS 1779) on Allied planning for the occupation of Germany, it was not adopted. US occupation policies aimed at "industrial disarmament", but contained a number of deliberate loopholes, limiting any action to short-term military measures and preventing large-scale destruction of mines and industrial plants, giving wide-ranging discretion to the military governor and Morgenthau's opponents at the War Department. An investigation by Herbert Hoover concluded the plan was unworkable, and would result in up to 25 million Germans dying from starvation. From 1947, US policies aimed at restoring a "stable and productive Germany" and were soon followed by the Marshall Plan.

When the Morgenthau Plan was published by the US press in September 1944, it was immediately seized upon by the Nazi German government and used as part of propaganda efforts in the final seven months of the war in Europe that aimed to convince Germans to fight on.

== Proposals ==
=== Morgenthau's memorandum ===
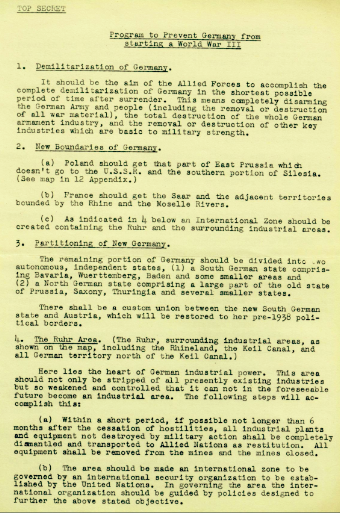
Document outlining the plan

The original memorandum, written some time between January and early September 1944, signed by Morgenthau, and headed "Suggested Post-Surrender Program for Germany", is preserved at the Franklin D. Roosevelt Presidential Library and Museum. According to Morgenthau's son, senior U.S. Treasury Department official and alleged Soviet spy Harry Dexter White was influential in drafting the memorandum.

The main provisions can be summarized as follows:

1. Demilitarization of Germany.
  It should be the aim of the Allied Forces to accomplish the complete demilitarization of Germany in the shortest possible period of time after surrender. This means completely disarming the German Army and people (including the removal or destruction of all war material), the total destruction of the whole German armament industry, and the removal or destruction of other key industries which are basic to military strength.
2. Partitioning of Germany.
  1. Poland should get that part of East Prussia which does not go to the USSR and the southern portion of Silesia as indicated on the attached map, (Appendix A)
  2. France should get the Saar and the Palatinate.
  3. As indicated in part 3 an International zone should be created containing the Ruhr and the surrounding industrial areas.
  4. The remaining portion of Germany should be divided into two autonomous, independent states, (1) a South German state comprising Bavaria, Württemberg, Baden and several smaller states and (2) a North German state comprising a large portion of Prussia, Saxony, Thuringia and several smaller states.
  There shall be a customs union between the new South German state and Austria, which will be restored to her pre-1938 political borders.
3. The Ruhr Area.
  (The Ruhr, surrounding industrial areas, as shown on the attached map, including the Rhineland, the Kiel Canal, and all German territory north of the Kiel Canal.) Here lies the heart of German industrial power, the cauldron of wars. This area should not only be stripped of all presently existing industries but so weakened and controlled that it can not in the foreseeable future become an industrial area. The following steps will accomplish this:
  1. Within a short period, if possible not longer than 6 months after the cessation of hostilities, all industrial plants and equipment not destroyed by military action shall either be completely dismantled and removed from the area or completely destroyed. All equipment shall be removed from the mines and the mines shall be thoroughly wrecked. It is anticipated that the stripping of this area would be accomplished in three stages:
    1. The military forces immediately upon entry into the area shall destroy all plants and equipment which cannot be removed.
    2. Removal of plants and equipment by members of the United Nations as restitution and reparation (Paragraph 4).
    3. All plants and equipment not removed within a stated period of time, say 6 months, will be completely destroyed or reduced to scrap and allocated to the United Nations.
  2. All people within the area should be made to understand that this area will not again be allowed to become an industrial area. Accordingly, all people and their families within the area having special skills or technical training should be encouraged to migrate permanently from the area and should be as widely dispersed as possible.
  3. The area should be made an international zone to be governed by an international security organization to be established by the United Nations. In governing the area the international organization should be guided by policies designed to further the above stated objectives.
  4. Restitution and Reparation.
    Reparations, in the form of recurrent payments and deliveries, should not be demanded. Restitution and reparation shall be effected by the transfer of existing German resources and territories, e.g.
    1. by restitution of property looted by the Germans in territories occupied by them;
    2. by transfer of German territory and German private rights in industrial property situated in such territory to invaded countries and the international organization under the program of partition;
    3. by the removal and distribution among devastated countries of industrial plants and equipment situated within the International Zone and the North and South German states delimited in the section on partition;
    4. by forced German labor outside Germany; and
    5. by confiscation of all German assets of any character whatsoever outside of Germany.

The Morgenthau Plan, in the sense of the plan drafted by Morgenthau or the plan initialed by Roosevelt, was never implemented. Germany was not made "primarily agricultural and pastoral in its character". However, some commentators, such as Gareau, extend the term to mean "any postwar program designed to effect and preserve German disarmament by significantly reducing German industrial might". JCS-1067, the April 1945 "Directive to Commander-in-Chief of United States Forces of Occupation Regarding the Military Government of Germany" specified the Allied objective as being "to prevent Germany from ever again becoming a threat to the peace of the world", including, as an essential step, "the industrial disarmament and demilitarization of Germany".

=== United States ===
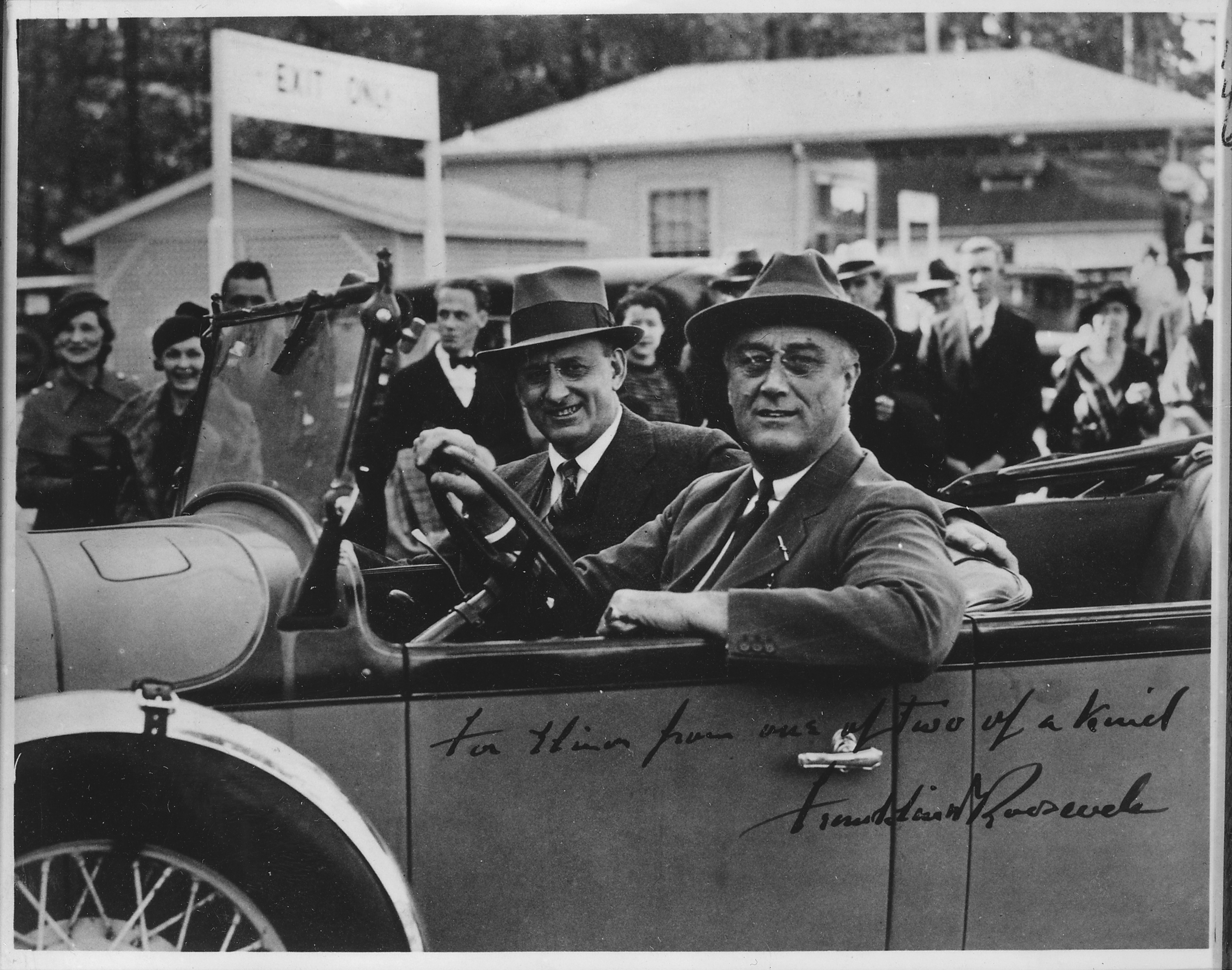
Roosevelt and Morgenthau, who have been described as "two of a kind"

As Secretary of the Treasury, Morgenthau was initially not involved in the drafting of the plans for Germany. On a trip to Europe at the beginning of August, Harry Dexter White, his most trusted collaborator in the Treasury Department, presented him the memorandum from the State Department. This memorandum left Morgenthau with the impression that the main aim was to rebuild Germany economically to such an extent that after a few years they would be able to pay reparations. For him, it came down to the supposition that after 10 years they would be ready to start World War III.

After his return from Europe, Morgenthau informed Secretary of State Cordell Hull that he would immediately take care of Germany's affairs with the following words: "I appreciate the fact that this isn't my responsibility, but I'm doing this as an American citizen, and I'm going to continue to do so, and I'm going to stick my nose into it until I know it is all right." He right away informed the President of his observations and the dangers he saw in the existing memorandum drawn up by Hull. The President showed increased interest in what had been accomplished, but despite all of Morgenthau's hopes, Roosevelt initially did not officially invite him to take part in the drafting of the plans.

Morgenthau now tried to achieve his objective in another way. In a meeting with Secretary of War Henry L. Stimson shortly thereafter, he suggested that a committee consisting of Stimson, Hull, and himself should meet to work out a memorandum for the upcoming conference in Quebec. In his next attempt at the President, he once again made clear that implementing the plan as it stood would have undesirable consequences. He also exclusively showed excerpts that he knew would displease the President. The lecture did not miss its aim. Morgenthau's explanations persuaded Roosevelt to write to Hull and Stimson that US occupation policy, which anticipated that "Germany is to be restored just as much as the Netherlands or Belgium", was excessively lenient. A better policy would have the Germans "fed three times a day with soup from Army soup kitchens", so "they will remember that experience the rest of their lives".

In addition, Roosevelt officially set up a committee consisting of Morgenthau, Stimson, and Hull to deal with the future of Germany. However, due to serious disagreement, the committee was unable to draw up a collaborative memorandum. Morgenthau on one side was drafting plans for how Germany could be ruined industrially, while other parts of the US government were already forging plans for how the country could be rebuilt after Nazi rule. Above all, the American business elite, which was still closely intertwined with German companies during the war, was interested in getting back to business as soon as possible. Hull, on the other hand, was outraged by Morgenthau's "inconceivable intrusion" into foreign policy. Hull told Roosevelt that the plan would inspire last-ditch resistance and cost thousands of American lives. Hull was so upset over the plan that he suffered from insomnia and eating problems and was hospitalized. He said that nothing would be left to Germany but land, and only 60% of the Germans could live off the land, meaning 40% of the population would die. Stimson expressed his opposition even more forcefully to Roosevelt. Hull later resigned for health reasons, though there were anecdotal reports that his resignation was brought about by "the Morgenthau business". So it came about that the Cabinet Committee on Germany met with Roosevelt on September 6, 1944, and discussed three different memoranda prepared by the State, War, and Treasury Departments.

=== Second Quebec Conference (September 1944) ===
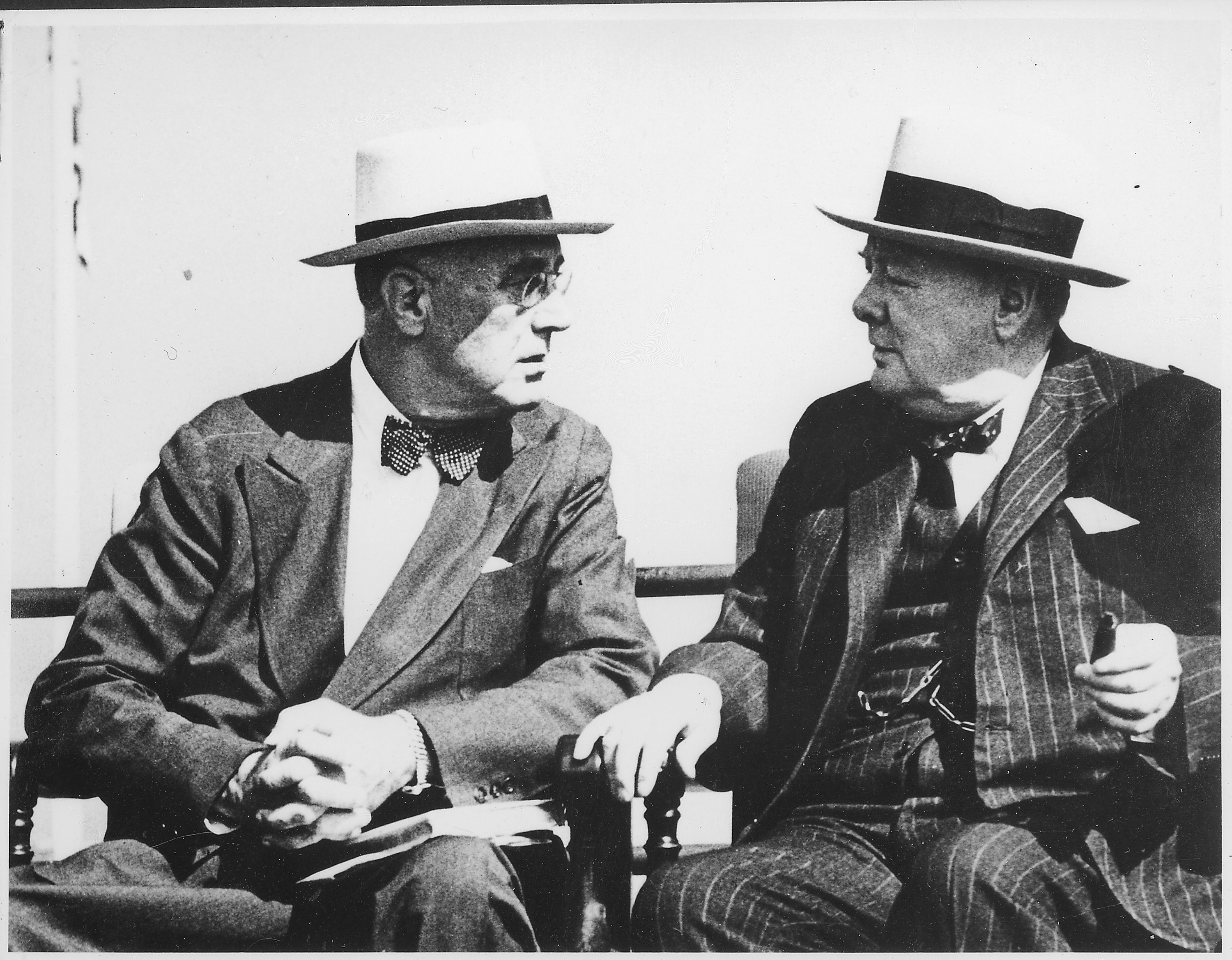
Franklin D. Roosevelt and Churchill in Quebec, 9 September 1944

At the Second Quebec Conference, a high-level military conference held in Quebec City, 12–16 September 1944, the British and United States governments, represented by Winston Churchill and Franklin D. Roosevelt respectively, reached agreement on a number of matters, including a plan for Germany, based on Morgenthau's original proposal. The memorandum drafted by Churchill provided for "eliminating the warmaking industries in the Ruhr and the Saar ... looking forward to converting Germany into a country primarily agricultural and pastoral in its character". However, it no longer included a plan to partition the country into several independent states. This memorandum is also referred to as the Morgenthau Plan.

The fact that Morgenthau was able to present his plans in Quebec despite the great resistance within the US government is precisely due to Hull's poor health. In fact, Roosevelt had asked Hull to accompany him to Quebec, but he was unable to do so for health reasons. It was only at the last minute, when the conference was on, that Roosevelt asked Morgenthau to follow him to Quebec. Ultimately, Roosevelt's motivations for agreeing to Morgenthau's proposal may be attributed to his desire to be on good terms with Joseph Stalin and to a personal conviction that Germany must be treated harshly. In a 26 August 1944 letter to Queen Wilhelmina of the Netherlands, Roosevelt wrote that "There are two schools of thought, those who would be altruistic in regard to the Germans, hoping by loving kindness to make them Christians again and those who would adopt a much 'tougher' attitude. Most decidedly I belong to the latter school, for though I am not bloodthirsty, I want the Germans to know that this time at least they have definitely lost the war".

=== British reaction ===
Churchill was not initially inclined to support the proposal, saying "England would be chained to a dead body". Roosevelt reminded Churchill of Stalin's comments at the Tehran Conference, and asked "Are you going to let Germany produce modern metal furniture? The manufacture of metal furniture can be quickly turned into the manufacture of armament." The meeting broke up on Churchill's disagreement but Roosevelt suggested that Morgenthau and White continue to discuss with Lord Cherwell, Churchill's personal assistant.

Lord Cherwell has been described as having "an almost pathological hatred for Nazi Germany, and an almost medieval desire for revenge was a part of his character". Morgenthau is quoted as saying to his staff that "I can't overemphasize how helpful Lord Cherwell was because he could advise how to handle Churchill". In any case, Cherwell was able to persuade Churchill to change his mind. Churchill later said that "At first I was violently opposed to the idea. But the President and Mr. Morgenthau from whom we had much to ask were so insistent that in the end we agreed to consider it".

Some have read into the clause "from whom we had much to ask" that Churchill was bought off, and note a September 15 memo from Roosevelt to Hull stating that "Morgenthau has presented at Quebec, in conjunction with his plan for Germany, a proposal of credits to Britain totalling six and half billion dollars". Hull's comment on this was that "this might suggest to some the quid pro quo with which the Secretary of the Treasury was able to get Mr. Churchill's adherence to his cataclysmic plan for Germany".

At Quebec, White made sure that Lord Cherwell understood that economic aid to Britain was dependent on British approval of the plan. During the signing of the plan, which coincided with the signing of a loan agreement, President Roosevelt proposed that they sign the plan first. This prompted Churchill to exclaim: "What do you want me to do? Get on my hind legs and beg like Fala?"

Anthony Eden expressed his strong opposition to the plan and, with the support of some others, was able to get the Morgenthau Plan set aside in Britain.

== Impact on the war ==
Journalist Drew Pearson publicized the plan on 21 September 1944. Although Pearson himself was sympathetic to it, more critical stories in The New York Times and The Wall Street Journal quickly followed. Joseph Goebbels used the Morgenthau Plan in his propaganda. Goebbels said that "The Jew Morgenthau" wanted to make Germany into a giant potato patch. The headline of the Völkischer Beobachter stated, "Roosevelt and Churchill Agree to Jewish Murder Plan!"

The Washington Post urged a stop to helping Dr. Goebbels: if the Germans suspect that nothing but complete destruction lies ahead, then they will fight on. Republican presidential candidate Thomas Dewey complained in his campaign that the plan had terrified the Germans into fanatical resistance: "Now they are fighting with the frenzy of despair."

General George Marshall complained to Morgenthau that German resistance had strengthened. Hoping to get Morgenthau to relent on his plan for Germany, President Roosevelt's son-in-law Lt. Colonel John Boettiger, who worked in the War Department, explained to Morgenthau how the American troops who had to fight for five weeks against fierce German resistance to capture the city of Aachen had complained to him that the Morgenthau Plan was "worth thirty divisions to the Germans". Morgenthau refused to relent.

On 11 December 1944, OSS operative William Donovan sent Roosevelt a telegraph message from Bern, warning him of the consequences that the knowledge of the Morgenthau plan had had on German resistance. The message was a translation of a recent article in the Neue Zürcher Zeitung.

So far, the Allies have not offered the opposition any serious encouragement. On the contrary, they have again and again welded together the people and the Nazis by statements published, either out of indifference or with a purpose. To take a recent example, the Morgenthau plan gave Dr. Goebbels the best possible chance. He was able to prove to his countrymen, in black and white, that the enemy planned the enslavement of Germany. The conviction that Germany had nothing to expect from defeat but oppression and exploitation still prevails, and that accounts for the fact that the Germans continue to fight. It is not a question of a regime, but of the homeland itself, and to save that, every German is bound to obey the call, whether he be Nazi or member of the opposition.

Following the negative public reaction to the publishing of the Morgenthau plan, President Roosevelt disowned it, saying "About this pastoral, agricultural Germany, that is just nonsense. I have not approved anything like that. I am sure I have not. ... I have no recollection of this at all". According to Stimson, the President said that he just wanted to help Britain get a share of the Ruhr and denied that he intended to fully deindustrialize Germany. Stimson replied, "Mr. President, I don't like you to dissemble to me" and read back to Roosevelt what he had signed. Struck by this, Roosevelt said he had "no idea how he could have initialed this". The theory that Roosevelt was not truly rejecting the plan is supported by later remarks by Eleanor Roosevelt, who stated that she never heard him disagree with the basics of the plan, and who believed that "the repercussions brought about by the press stories made him feel that it was wise to abandon any final solution at that time". However, other sources suggest that Roosevelt "had not realized the devastating nature of the program he had initialed".

== Morgenthau's book Germany is Our Problem ==
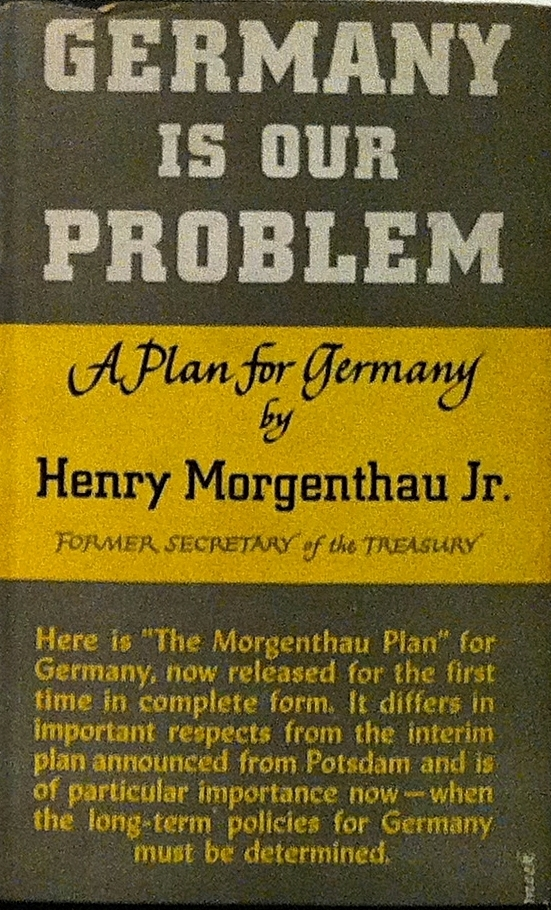
Morgenthau's 1945 book Germany is Our Problem

In October 1945, Harper and Brother published Morgenthau's book Germany is Our Problem, where Morgenthau described his plan and the rationale for it in greater detail. President Franklin D. Roosevelt had granted permission for the publication of the book the evening before his death, when dining with Morgenthau at Warm Springs.

A review in The New York Times on 7 October 1945 felt that the book was important to the survival of the American people and would help prevent World War III. A review by Orville Prescott on 5 October 1945 in the same newspaper concluded that the whole world would benefit if copies of the book reached the key US decisionmakers responsible for policy about Germany.

In November 1945, General Dwight D. Eisenhower, the military governor of the US Occupation Zone, approved the distribution of 1,000 free copies of the book to American military officials in occupied Germany. Historian Stephen Ambrose draws the conclusion that, despite Eisenhower's later claims that the act was not an endorsement of the Morgenthau plan, Eisenhower both approved of the plan and had previously given Morgenthau at least some of his ideas on how Germany should be treated.

== Occupation policy ==
=== JCS 1067 ===
A Handbook for Military Government in Germany was ready in August 1944: it advocated a quick restoration of normal life for the German people and reconstruction of Germany. Henry Morgenthau Jr. brought it to the attention of President Franklin D. Roosevelt who, after reading it, rejected it with the words:

Too many people here and in England hold the view that the German people as a whole are not responsible for what has taken place – that only a few Nazis are responsible. That unfortunately is not based on fact. The German people must have it driven home to them that the whole nation has been engaged in a lawless conspiracy against the decencies of modern civilization.

The military-issued Pocket Guide to Germany commanded soldiers "There must be no fraternization ! This is absolute !", but the authors—perhaps uncertain of whether their readers would obey—also discussed regulations on venereal disease and marriages with locals. After the press published in September 1944 photographs of American soldiers fraternizing with German civilians near Aachen, the Pentagon immediately ordered the army to prevent a recurrence of such events.

A new document was drafted in September 1944, the Joint Chiefs of Staff directive 1067 (JCS 1067), which directed the US forces of occupation in Germany to "take no steps looking toward the economic rehabilitation of Germany [nor steps] designed to maintain or strengthen the German economy". Because of fears that soldiers would encounter Werwolf fanatics willing to die for Nazi ideology, it strictly forbade fraternization with Germans, including attending church services, visiting homes, playing games, trading gifts, or even shaking hands; violators risked being fined $65 (about one month of pay for a US Army private) and court-martial. JCS 1067 also ordered that starvation, disease and civil unrest were to be kept below such levels where they would pose a danger to the troops of occupation. The directive was approved by President Harry Truman on 10 May 1945, then formally issued to Eisenhower, and was the basis for US occupation policy until July 1947. It applied only to the US zone (although attempts had been made to get the other Allies to accept it). The occupation directive remained secret until 17 October 1945. It was made known to the public two months after the US had succeeded in incorporating much of it into the Potsdam Agreement.

Morgenthau had been able to wield considerable influence over JCS 1067 and, like the Morgenthau Plan, intended to reduce German living standards. The production of oil, rubber, merchant ships, and aircraft were prohibited. Occupation forces were not to assist with economic development apart from the agricultural sector. Ignoring the amendments to JCS 1067 that had been inserted by John J. McCloy of the War Department, Morgenthau told his staff that it was a big day for the Treasury, and that he hoped that "someone doesn't recognize it as the Morgenthau Plan".

In occupied Germany, Morgenthau left a direct legacy through what in OMGUS commonly were called "Morgenthau boys". These were US Treasury officials whom Dwight D. Eisenhower had "loaned" to the Army of occupation. These people ensured that JCS 1067 was interpreted as strictly as possible. They were most active in the first crucial months of the occupation, but continued their activities for almost two years following the resignation of Morgenthau in mid-1945 and, some time later, also of their leader Colonel Bernard Bernstein, who was "the repository of the Morgenthau spirit in the army of occupation".

=== Consequences ===
The problems brought on by the execution of these types of policies were eventually apparent to most American officials in Germany. Germany had long been the industrial giant of Europe, and its poverty held back the general European recovery. Fifteen percent of industry in the US sector was operable in August 1945, and running at about 5% capacity. The continued scarcity in Germany also led to considerable expenses for the occupying powers, which were obligated to try to make up the most important shortfalls through the GARIOA (Government and Relief in Occupied Areas) program.

As early as 7 May 1945, General Lucius D. Clay asked for flexibility in implementing JCS 1067. As US High Commissioner, he later wrote in his 1950 book Decision in Germany, "It seemed obvious to us even then that Germany would starve unless it could produce for export and that immediate steps would have to be taken to revive industrial production". Lewis Douglas, chief adviser to General Clay, denounced JCS Directive 1067 saying, "This thing was assembled by economic idiots. It makes no sense to forbid the most skilled workers in Europe from producing as much as they can in a continent that is desperately short of everything". Douglas went to Washington, D.C. to revise the directive but was unable to do so.

By then, however, the military government was already adjusting to the situation; SHAEF in April 1945 established the Production Control Agency to restore industrial production for both German and Allied use. While it in theory was supposed to minimize production for German civilian use to as little as possible, in practice that directive was ignored. Coal was vital; as early as May 1945 plans to close German mines were nullified, after the American and British experts of the Potter-Hyndley Mission predicted that "Unless drastic steps are taken, there will occur in Northwest Europe and the Mediterranean next winter a coal famine of such severity as to destroy all semblance of law and order, and thus delay any chance of reasonable stability". Every new industry that restarted increased the demand for coal, and hundreds of tons were stolen during transport. American policy slowly drifted away from "industrial disarmament". Herbert Hoover's situation reports from 1947 and "A Report on Germany" also served to help change occupation policy, among other things, through speaking frankly of the expected consequences:

There are several illusions in all this "war potential" attitude. There is the illusion that the New Germany left after the annexations [of the Saar and Ruhr] can be reduced to a "pastoral state". It cannot be done unless we exterminate or move 25,000,000 people out of it. This would approximately reduce Germany to the density of the population of France.

The Potter-Hyndley Mission had contemplated possibly needing "to preserve order by shooting", and in October 1945 the military government warned German officials that they and their areas would be held responsible for any attacks on occupation forces. Although the winter of 1945-1946 was very mild, civilians did not know that the government maintained the 1,550-kilocalorie ration by drawing on American supplies, not from improving local supply. By March 1946 the imported supply would last another 60 days. The British zone reduced rations to 1,042 calories that month, and the French to 980; the US zone reduced its to 1,275 calories in April, and 1,180 in late May. It improved to 1,330 calories in June only by using Army surplus supplies from around the world, less nutritional than an equal amount of grain. Germans disliked rations' use of maize corn because they had only used it for chicken feed. According to Alan S. Milward, in 1946–1947 the average kilocalorie intake per day in Germany was only 1,080, an amount insufficient for long-term health. Other sources state that the kilocalorie intake in those years varied between as low as 1,000 and 1,500. William Clayton reported to Dean Acheson in Washington on May 27, 1947: "Millions of people in the cities are slowly starving." The Western powers' worst fear by now was that the poverty and hunger would drive the Germans to Communism. Clay stated "There is no choice between being a communist on 1,500 calories a day and a believer in democracy on a thousand".

In view of the continued poverty and famine in Europe, and with the onset of the Cold War which made it important not to lose all of Germany to the communists, it was apparent by 1947 that a change of policy was required. After lobbying by the Joint Chiefs of Staff, and Generals Clay and George Marshall, the Truman administration realized that economic recovery in Europe could not go forward without the reconstruction of the German industrial base on which it had previously been dependent.

=== Revocation of JCS 1067 and replacement with JCS 1779 ===
In July 1947, President Truman rescinded on "national security grounds" the punitive JCS 1067, which had directed the US forces of occupation in Germany to "take no steps looking toward the economic rehabilitation of Germany". It was replaced by JCS 1779, which instead stressed that "[a]n orderly, prosperous Europe requires the economic contributions of a stable and productive Germany". JCS 1067 had then been in effect for over two years.

The change was heralded by Restatement of Policy on Germany, a famous speech by James F. Byrnes, then United States Secretary of State, held in Stuttgart on 6 September 1946. Also known as the "Speech of hope", it set the tone of future US policy as it repudiated the Morgenthau Plan economic policies and with its message of change to a policy of economic reconstruction gave the Germans hope for the future. The most notable example of this change of policy was that the Marshall Plan was extended to West Germany, although in the form of loans instead of the free aid granted to other countries.

It took over two months for General Clay to overcome continued resistance to the new directive JCS 1779, but on 10 July 1947 it was approved at a meeting of the SWNCC (State-War-Navy Coordinating Committee). The final version of the document "was purged of the most important elements of the Morgenthau plan". The "Morgenthau boys" resigned en masse when JCS 1779 was approved, but before they went, the Morgenthau followers in the decartelization division of OMGUS accomplished one last task in the spring of 1947: the destruction of the old German banking system. By breaking the relationships between German banks, they cut off the flow of credit between them, limiting them to short-term financing only, thus preventing the rehabilitation of German industry and with immediate adverse effects on the economy in the US occupation zone.

With the change of occupation policy, most significantly thanks to the Currency Reform of 1948, Germany eventually made an impressive recovery, later known as the Wirtschaftswunder ("economic miracle").

== Actions taken under JCS 1067 ==
In January 1946 the Allied Control Council set the foundation of the future German economy by putting a cap on German steel production; the maximum allowed was set at about 25% of the prewar production level. Steel plants thus made redundant were dismantled. Also as a consequence of the Potsdam Conference, the occupation forces of all nations were obliged to ensure that German standards of living could not exceed the average level of European neighbors with which it had been at war, France in particular. Germany was to be reduced to the standard of life it had known in 1932. The first "level of industry" plan, signed in 1946, stated that German heavy industry was to be lowered to 50% of its 1938 levels by the closing of 1,500 manufacturing plants.

On 2 February 1946, a dispatch from Berlin reported:

Some progress has been made in converting Germany to an agricultural and light industry economy, said Brigadier General William H. Draper, Jr., chief of the American Economics Division, who emphasized that there was general agreement on that plan. He explained that Germany's future industrial and economic pattern was being drawn for a population of 66,500,000. On that basis, he said, the nation will need large imports of food and raw materials to maintain a minimum standard of living. General agreement, he continued, had been reached on the types of German exports – coal, coke, electrical equipment, leather goods, beer, wines, spirits, toys, musical instruments, textiles and apparel – to take the place of the heavy industrial products which formed most of Germany's pre-war exports.

A draft report from The President's Economic Mission to Germany and Austria stated:

[T]here have been general policies of destruction or limitation of possible peaceful productivity under the headings of "pastoral state" and "war potential". The original of these policies apparently expressed on September 15, 1944, at Quebec, aimed at: "converting Germany into a country principally agricultural and pastoral," and included, "the industries of the Ruhr and the Saar would therefore be put out of action, closed down..." (quotation marks from original source)

All armaments plants, including some that could have been converted to civilian operation, were dismantled or destroyed. A large proportion of operational civilian plants were dismantled and transported to the victorious nations, mainly France and Russia. As Germany was allowed neither airplane production nor any shipbuilding capacity to supply a merchant navy, all facilities of this type were destroyed over a period of several years. A typical example of this activity by the allies was the Blohm & Voss shipyard in Hamburg, where explosive demolition was still taking place as late as 1949. Everything that could not be dismantled was blown up or otherwise destroyed. A small-scale attempt to revive the company in 1948 ended with the owners and a number of employees being thrown in jail by the British. It was not until 1953 that the situation gradually started to improve for Blohm & Voss, thanks in part to repeated pleas by German Chancellor Konrad Adenauer to the Allied High Commissioners.

Early US plans for "industrial disarmament" included detaching the Saarland and the Ruhr from Germany in order to remove much of the remaining industrial potential. As late as March 1947 there were still active plans to let France annex the Ruhr, noted by Charles P. Kindleberger of the United States Department of State, who said: "The Times' article and editorial on the breach in the U.S. ranks on the subject of the Ruhr were accurate, and the latter excellent. I have been disturbed over the arena in which the debate has been carried out. Clay and Draper claim that Germany will go communist shortly after any proposal to infringe on its sovereignty over the Ruhr is carried out." The Saar Protectorate, another important source of coal and industry for Germany, was likewise to be lost by the Germans. It was cut out from Germany and its resources put under French control. In 1955, the French, under pressure from West Germany and her newfound allies, held a plebiscite in the Saar Protectorate on the question of reunification or independence. Reunification won overwhelmingly, and on January 1, 1957, it rejoined West Germany as the state of Saarland.

Timber exports from the US occupation zone were particularly heavy. Sources in the US government stated that the purpose of this was the "ultimate destruction of the war potential of German forests". As a consequence of the practiced clear-felling, extensive deforestation resulted which could "be replaced only by long forestry development over perhaps a century".

In addition to the physical barriers that had to be overcome, for the German economic recovery there were also intellectual challenges. The Allies confiscated intellectual property of great value, all German patents both in Germany and abroad, and used them to strengthen their own industrial competitiveness by licensing them to Allied companies. Beginning immediately after the German surrender and continuing for the next two years, the US pursued a vigorous program to harvest all technological and scientific know-how as well as all patents in Germany. John Gimbel comes to the conclusion, in his book Science Technology and Reparations: Exploitation and Plunder in Postwar Germany, that the "intellectual reparations" taken by the US and the UK amounted to close to $10 billion. During the more than two years that this policy was in place, no industrial research in Germany could take place without any results being automatically available to overseas competitors who were encouraged by the occupation authorities to access all records and facilities. Meanwhile, thousands of the best German researchers were being put to work in the Soviet Union (Operation Osoaviakhim) and in the UK and US (see also Operation Paperclip).

In 1949, West German Chancellor Konrad Adenauer wrote to the Allies requesting that the policy of industrial dismantling end, citing the inherent contradiction between encouraging industrial growth and removing factories and also the unpopularity of the policy.

In 1953, it was decided that Germany was to repay $1.1 billion of the aid it had received. The last repayment was made in June 1971. In a largely symbolic 2004 resolution by the lower house of the Polish Parliament, reparations of $640 billion were demanded from Germany, mainly as a weapon in an ongoing argument regarding German property claims on formerly German territory. However, at the Potsdam Conference the Soviet Union undertook to settle the reparation claims of Poland from its own share of reparations from Germany. In 1953 Poland agreed to forego further reparations claims against Germany. Meanwhile, Poland was now in possession of almost a quarter of pre-war German territory, including the important industrial centers in Silesia and the richest coal fields in Europe. In addition, many ethnic Germans living within the Polish pre-war borders were, for years prior to their expulsion, used as forced labor in camps such as that run by Salomon Morel, Central Labour Camp Jaworzno, Central Labour Camp Potulice, Łambinowice, Zgoda labor camp and others.

== Historical assessments ==
Historical assessments differ with regard to the nature, duration and effects of Morgenthau's plan and JCS 1067 on American and Allied policies. US diplomat James Dobbins writes that an early draft of JCS 1067 had been written while the plan was still understood to be US policy, and "[b]ecause nothing replaced the Morgenthau plan once it had been disavowed, the final version of JCS 1067 contained many of the harsh measures and all the intent of a hard peace toward Germany". However, according to Dobbins, in May 1945 – shortly after its approval in April 1945 – the newly appointed deputy military governor, General Clay, implied that the directive was unworkable and initially wanted it to be revised; after the deliberate loopholes were pointed out to him, General Clay did not press further for a revision but "took great liberties in interpreting and implementing JCS 1067". Clay's well-intentioned effort did meet obstacles, like General Marshall forbidding him from relaxing the strict non-fraternization policy to a more reasonable level. Dobbins remarks that the harsh punitive measures shifted toward reform over time as the US faced the problem of feeding millions of Germans and the Soviet expansion.

Gerhard Schulz mentions that the American military government was, until 1947, operating under JCS 1067, which he describes as "a framework that had its origin in the Morgenthau Plan". Georg Kotowski also mentions that,

As far as I know the results [of the revisionist debate], it seems to me that, although plans for a policy concerning post-war Germany had been developed as early as 1941, no plan had been adopted by the president that could have served as a basis for a purposeful policy. This resulted in the German question being postponed to after the final victory over the Axis Powers and Japan. At most, the short-lived approval of the Morgenthau Plan by Roosevelt might possibly be seen as a guiding principle of his policy toward Germany, especially since important elements of this plan found their way into [JCS 1067 ...].

Michael Zürn talks of the policy of "Never again a strong Germany!" that found its expression in the JCS 1067 (which was influenced by the Morgenthau Plan), but this principle was abandoned by the USA soon after the Potsdam Conference, though it was not until 1947 that JCS 1067 was replaced by JCS 1779 and its related "European Recovery Program". Kindleberger describes this time:

With the termination of hostilities, the mood of suppression gave way to ambivalence – in the West. Germany needed to be punished for wrongdoing, but it was also essential to revive the German economy for its necessary contribution to European recovery. The stern pronouncement of the Joint Chiefs of Staff Directive (JCS 1067) that the United States commander should do nothing to restore the German economy above the minimum level necessary to prevent such disease and unrest as might endanger the occupation forces gave way in July 1945 to an order to stimulate coal production for export delivery to Belgium, the Netherlands, and France [which did not materialize ...].

In May 1946, General Clay's stop-order on the dismantling of plants (for reparations) marked the first open recognition of the failure of Potsdam. After 1947, when conflicting policies began to be reconciled, economic and social conditions began to be improved.

Henry Burke Wend refers to JCS 1067, as approved on 14 May 1945, as a compromise document which, "together with Truman's ascension to the presidency [on 12 April 1945], spelled the demise of the Morgenthau Plan". Despite this, "denazification, deconcentration and dismantling had a profound, if varied, impact on German industrial recovery". Even with the introduction of the Marshall Plan, self-defeating policies that simultaneously industrialized Germany (by investing billions of dollars) and deindustrialized it (through heavy dismantling of its industry) continued until 1948–1949. Walter M. Hudson describes JCS 1067 as less harsh than Morgenthau's plan: while core elements of the Morgenthau Plan were incorporated in JCS 1067, it was deliberately diluted, and permitted the military government to be more flexible than envisaged by the Morgenthau Plan.

The German Federal Agency for Civic Education (BPB) asserts that the Morgenthau Plan was never implemented and was only briefly supported by Roosevelt, and that JCS 1067, while treating Germany as a defeated enemy state instead of a liberated nation and aiming at the dismantling of German industries, also left loopholes that allowed a military governor to later implement more lenient policies. The agency states that the purpose of JCS 1779, which replaced JCS 1067, was to increase German self-government at the regional level, limit dismantling of war industries, raise living standards, and remove dependence on subsidies.

German historian Bernd Greiner talks of the failure of Morgenthau and the backward-looking political minority that supported him, stating that by the end of 1945 Morgenthau's staff had returned to the USA despondent, and those then in charge were not interested in "industrial disarmament". However, according to Greiner, the "Morgenthau myth" (German: die Morgenthau-Legende) was perpetuated in West Germany by right-wing extremist historians echoing Nazi propaganda and railing against an "extermination plan" for Germany by Jews and the left-wing intelligentsia in the United States, while in Communist East Germany the Morgenthau Plan was presented as a western imperialist plot to destroy Germany.

Wolfgang Benz, director of the Center for Research on Antisemitism at Technische Universität Berlin, states that the plan had no significance for the later occupation and Germany policy, though Nazi propaganda on the subject had a lasting effect and is still used for propaganda purposes by extreme right-wing organizations. Benz also states that Morgenthau had romantic agrarianist ideals which might mean that the intentions of his plan could have been beyond preventing conflicts. German historian Rainer Gömmel criticizes the common claim by historians, including Benz, that the Morgenthau Plan was never implemented, arguing that core elements of the plan, namely the proposals for deindustrialization, were adopted in August 1945 and became part of Allied policy.

A number of historians considered the possibility that Morgenthau may have been influenced by Harry Dexter White, an alleged Soviet agent based on Venona evidence, to develop the Morgenthau Plan – as the weakening of industry in Western Allied occupied territory would be beneficial to the Soviet Union's campaign for influence in postwar Germany. The hypothesis is based on White's previous pro-Soviet actions such as advocating virtually unlimited Soviet printing of AM-Marks which transferred wealth to East Germany. Critics of the hypothesis, such as historian James C. Van Hook, state that the Morgenthau Plan rejected reparations that were part of official Soviet demands, and Harry Dexter White's other economic initiatives at Bretton Woods were so in favor of postwar capitalism that it is difficult to see him as entirely a Soviet agent.

The relevant volume of the British official history of the Second World War states that the Morgenthau Plan "exercised little influence upon Allied policy after the Potsdam Conference ... where more realistic views were adopted". The history argues, though, that prior to the conference the plan "disastrously bedevilled much military government planning" and led to an ill-judged hardening of Allied plans for occupied Germany as well as disagreements between the US and British governments.

== See also ==
- Allied plans for German industry after World War II
- Baruch Plan
- Dutch annexation of German territory after World War II
- German reparations for World War II
- Germany Must Perish!, a book that advocated for similar measures, with the addition of the genocide of Germans
- History of Germany since 1945
- Marshall Plan
- Monnet Plan, a post-war economic reconstruction plan for France
- Nero Decree
- Wirtschaftswunder ("Economic miracle", the seemingly 'miraculous' economic recovery of post–World War II West Germany)
- Operation Paperclip
- Reconstruction of Germany
- Denazification

== Bibliography ==
- Beschloss, Michael R (2002), The Conquerors: Roosevelt, Truman and the Destruction of Hitler's Germany, 1941–1945, New York: Simon & Schuster, ISBN 9780684810270, OCLC 50315054
- Blum, John Morton (1967), From the Morgenthau Diaries: Years of War, 1941–1945, Boston
- Dietrich, John (2002). The Morgenthau Plan: Soviet Influence on American Postwar Policy. Algora. ISBN 9781892941909.
- Gareau, Frederick H (June 1961), "Morgenthau's Plan for Industrial Disarmament in Germany", The Western Political Quarterly, 14 (2): 517–534, doi:10.1177/106591296101400210, S2CID 153880544
- Greiner, Bernd (1995). Die Morgenthau-Legende: Zur Geschichte eines umstrittenen Planes [The Morgenthau Myth: The History of a Controversial Plan] (in German). Peter Lang. ISBN 9783930908073.
- Hull, Cordell (1948), Memories, vol. II
- Lewkowicz, Nicolas, The German Question and the International Order, 1943—1948 Basingstoke and New York, Palgrave Macmillan, 2010. ISBN 9780230248120
- Lewkowicz, Nicolas, The German Question and the Origins of the Cold War Milan, IPOC, 2008.] ISBN 978-8895145273
- Petrov, Vladimir (1967), Money and Conquest; Allied Occupation Currencies in World War II, Baltimore: Johns Hopkins Press
