= Restatement =

Restatement may refer to:

- Restatements of the Law, published by the American Law Institute as scholarly refinements of black letter law; these include:
  - Restatement of Contracts, Second, completed by the American Law Institute in 1979
- Restatement of Policy on Germany, a famous speech by James F. Byrnes, then United States Secretary of State, held in Stuttgart on September 6, 1946
- Restatement (finance), the amendment and republication of a company's financial statement to correct an error, or change in accounting standard
- Repetition (music)
