= Calvin Hoover =

Calvin Hoover may refer to:

- Calvin Hoover (murderer) (1956–2015), identified as the real murderer of Christine Jessop
- Calvin B. Hoover (1897–1974), economist and professor
