= Duane Swank =

Duane Swank (born May 28, 1953, Decatur, IL) is a scholar of comparative political economy and the welfare state. His research has critiqued the conventional view that the welfare state is in decline and has sought to explain the political origins of different types of modifications to capitalism. Swank is currently an emeritus Professor of Political Science at Marquette University. He received his B.A. from Millikin University and his Ph.D. at Northwestern University.
