= Germany Must Perish! =

1941 anti-German book by Theodore N. Kaufman

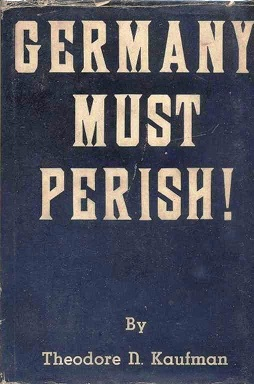
- First-edition cover
- Author: Theodore N. Kaufman
- Language: English
- Publisher: Argyle Press
- Publication date: 28 February 1941
- Publication place: United States
- Media type: Print (hardback and paperback)
- Pages: 104
- OCLC: 11425880
- Dewey Decimal: 914.3

Germany Must Perish! is a 104-page book written by Theodore N. Kaufman, which he self-published in 1941 in the United States. The book advocated genocide through the sterilization of all Germans and the territorial dismemberment of Germany, believing that this would achieve world peace.

Kaufman founded the Argyle Press in Newark, New Jersey, United States, in order to publish this book. He was the sole proprietor of the Argyle Press.

The Nazi Party used the book, written by a Jewish author, to support their argument that Jews were plotting against their country.

== Contents ==
Kaufman advocated the mass extermination of the German people through forced sterilization and the territorial dismemberment of Germany after an Allied victory in World War II.

Kaufman summarized Germany Must Perish! in advertisements in The New York Times and New York Post as: "A dynamic volume outlining a plan for the extinction of Germany and containing a map showing possible dissection and apportionment of its territory." Kaufman defended his plan for the "sterilization of all Germans" in an interview published in the September 26, 1941, issue of The Canadian Jewish Chronicle:

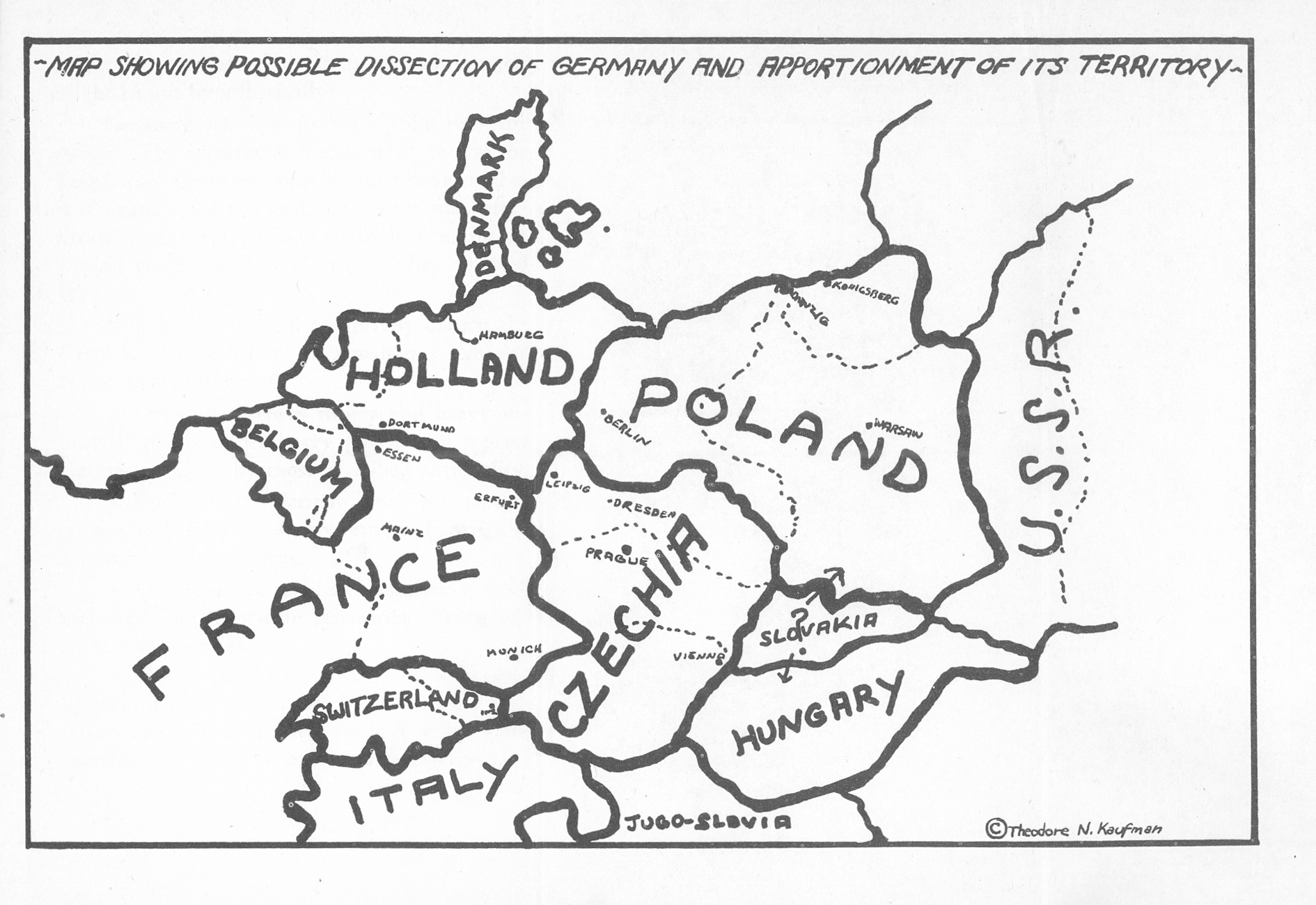
Map showing Kaufman's proposed dismemberment of Germany (and Austria)

I believe that the Jews have a mission in life. They must see to it that the nations of the world get together in one vast federation. "Union Now" is the beginning of this. Slowly but surely the world will develop into a paradise. We will have perpetual peace. And the Jews will do the most to bring about this confederation, because they have the most to gain. But how can you get peace if Germany exists? The only way to win an eternal peace is to make the punishment of waging war more horrible than war itself. Human beings are penalized for murder, aren't they? Well, Germany starts all the wars of magnitude. Let us sterilize all Germans and wars of world domination will come to an end!

== Reception ==
=== In the United States ===
Although self-published, the book received considerable attention. Time magazine published a review in its 24 March issue that compared the book to Jonathan Swift's 1729 satirical essay A Modest Proposal, which proposed reducing the population pressure in Ireland by the cannibalistic consumption of poor Irish infants. However, the Time essay recognized that Kaufman's work was not satirical; it described the book as the "enshrinement of a single sensational idea". "Since Germans are the perennial disturbers of the world's peace, says the book, they must be dealt with like any homicidal criminals. But it is unnecessary to put the whole German nation to the sword. It is more humane to sterilize them."

According to one study, reviews in the United States "reflected an odd combination of straight reporting and skepticism". Kaufman's second and more moderate pamphlet, "No More German Wars" published in 1942, was ignored in both the U.S. and Germany.

An advertisement in The New York Times stated that the book was released to the public on March 1, 1941. Kaufman also promoted the book by mailing a miniature black cardboard coffin with a hinged lid to reviewers. Inside the coffin was a card proclaiming, "Read GERMANY MUST PERISH! Tomorrow you will receive your copy."

The book's dust jacket contained excerpts from reviews of the book. One blurb read: "A Plan For Permanent Peace Among Civilized Nations! -- New York Times."

Kaufman's book was cited by a prominent Jewish-American trial lawyer, Louis Nizer. In his 1944 book What To Do With Germany, Nizer accepted the collective punishment of Germans and considered, though ultimately rejected, their mass "eugenic sterilization".

In 1945, Donald Lach wrote an article claiming that the book was "little more than self-indulgence in dire vituperation by a man who sees Germany as the sole cause of the world's woes".

=== In Germany ===
Kaufman was a Manhattan-born Jew and his advocacy of genocide attracted great attention in Germany. The book was denounced in Germany as an "orgy of Jewish hatred", and it was seen as inspired by United States President Franklin D. Roosevelt's supposed polemical anti-German agitation. According to historian Richard J. Evans, Theodore Kaufman, who was in reality an obscure and eccentric journalist, was portrayed in Nazi propaganda orchestrated by Joseph Goebbels as a prominent representative of 'world Jewry' and an advisor to Franklin D. Roosevelt.

On July 24, 1941, the Nazi Party's newspaper, Völkischer Beobachter, published a front-page article on the book titled: "The Product of Criminal Jewish Sadism: Roosevelt Demands the Sterilization of the German People." The newspaper alleged that Kaufman was a close ally of Samuel Irving Rosenman, an advisor to Franklin Delano Roosevelt and that: "Given the close relationship of the writer to the White House, this monstrous war program can be seen as a synthesis of genuine Talmudic hatred and Roosevelt's views on foreign policy.". The book utilized the expression "final solution" on page 88, and just one week after the front-page article, on July 31, 1941, Hermann Goering, Hitler's second in command, sent an official order to Reinhard Heydrich, the head of the security branch of the SS, using the words "final solution" when authorizing a “Final Solution of the Jewish Question.”

American journalist Howard K. Smith was in Germany when Germany Must Perish! became known. He wrote:

No man has ever done so irresponsible a disservice to the cause his nation is fighting and suffering for than Nathan Kaufman. His half-baked brochure provided the Nazis with one of the best light artillery pieces they have, for, used as the Nazis used it, it served to bolster up that terror which forces Germans who dislike the Nazis to support, fight and die to keep Nazism alive ...

In September 1941, Julius Streicher published an essay in Der Stürmer that called Kaufman's book "the crazy thinking of [an] insane Jewish brain". He quoted Kaufman at length and then commented: "By destroying the German people, the Jew wants to stop up the spring from which, since the beginning, the world has always found its creative blood, the source of all that is beautiful, good and noble." Joseph Goebbels also gave a radio address from Berlin warning Germans of "plans 'for sterilization of our entire population under 60 years' of age". These concerns were echoed by Adolf Hitler himself after the US entered World War II; he claimed mass sterilization of German male youth was a "primary" American goal.

When the Jews of Hanover were evicted on September 8, 1941, and later ghettoized as part of "Aktion Lauterbacher", the local authorities cited Kaufman's book as one of the reasons. Kaufman responded:

This is just a flimsy pretext for another of the innate cruelties of the German people ... I don't think it was my book that prompted this barbarity. They employed every possible German cruelty against the Jews long before my book was published.

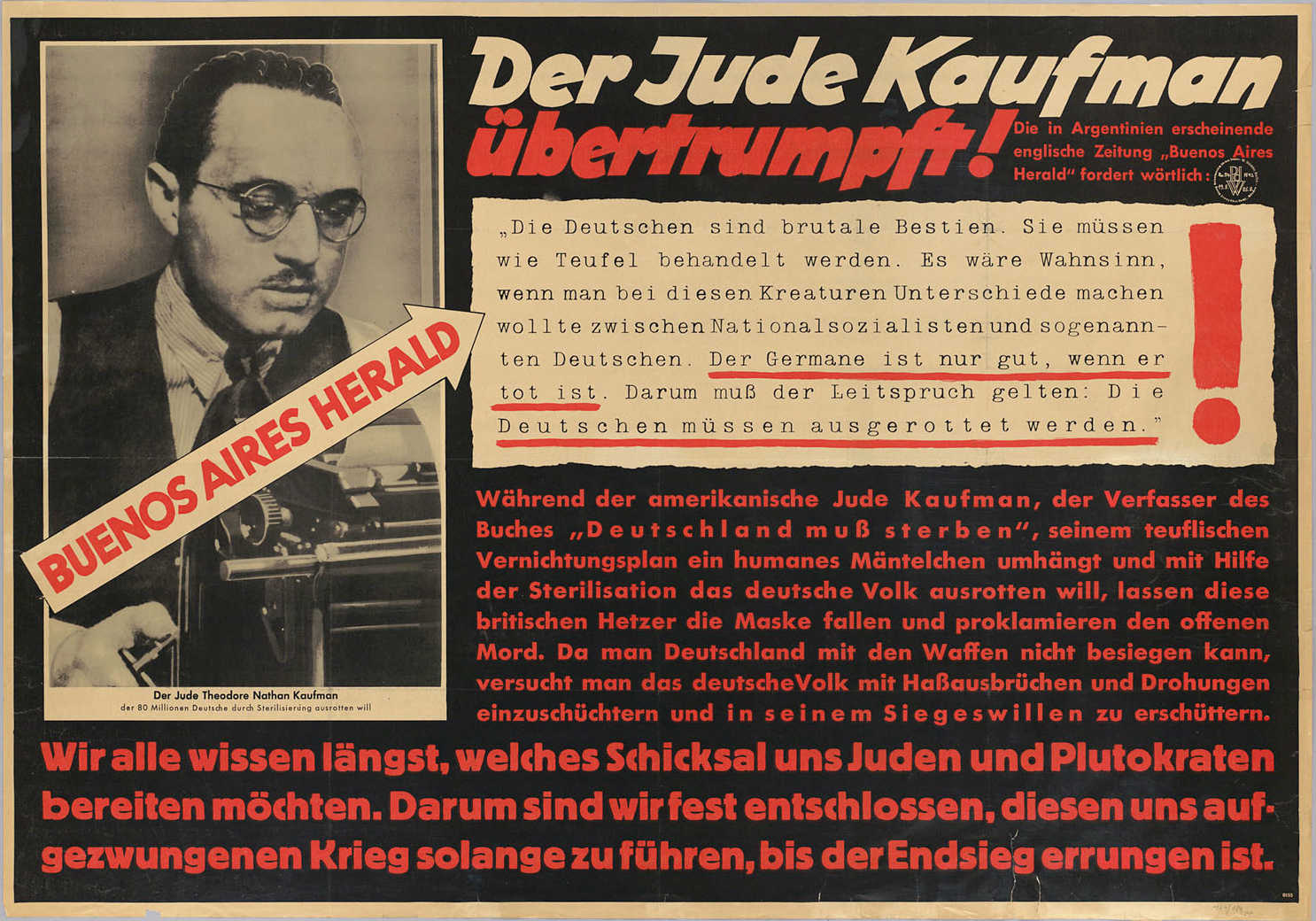
19 August 1942 edition of Parole der Woche condemning Kaufman

The book appeared in many pieces of Nazi propaganda. Parole der Woche's weekly wall newspaper included it as evidence that the Allies' war aims included the destruction of Germany. The pamphlet "The War Goal of World Plutocracy" detailed the contents of the book, although with some omissions from the text that it quoted. It was used in 1944 in a pamphlet, "Never!", which described Kaufman's importance:

The Jewish president of the American Federation of Peace is no anonymous individual, no fanatic rejected by world Jewry, no mentally ill crackpot, but rather a leading and widely known Jewish personality in the United States. He belongs to the so-called Roosevelt Brain Trust, which provides intellectual and political education and advice to the American President. "It is therefore beyond question that his book and its demand that 'Germany must perish' corresponds to the official opinion of the leading circles of world plutocracy."

At his Nuremberg trial, Julius Streicher cited Kaufman's book in his defense, claiming his anger at Jews was prompted by Germany Must Perish!. The German philosopher and historian Ernst Nolte argues that the German reaction to Germany Must Perish! supports his contention that World War II was a genuine response to German fears of a worldwide Jewish plot.

== See also ==
- Germania est delenda
- Germany Is Our Problem
- Society for the Prevention of World War III
- Your Job in Germany
- Morgenthau Plan
