= Germany Is Our Problem =

Book by Morgenthau describing post-WWII plan for Germany

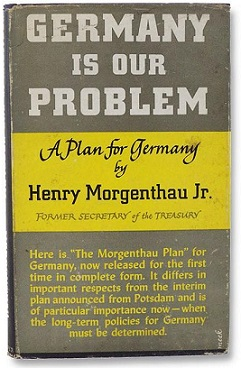
- First edition
- Author: Henry Morgenthau Jr.
- Language: English
- Genre: Non-fiction
- Publisher: Harper & Brothers
- Publication date: October 1945
- Publication place: United States

Germany is Our Problem is a book written in 1945 by Henry Morgenthau Jr., U.S. Secretary of the Treasury during the administration of Franklin D. Roosevelt. In the book he describes and promotes a plan for the occupation of Germany after World War II.

== Background ==
During 1944 Henry Morgenthau involved himself in U.S. foreign policy, and together with his associate Harry White he formulated the Morgenthau Plan. For the sake of permanently eliminating German war potential the plan advocated amongst other things German territorial dismemberment, partitioning, and deindustrialization. The plan was agreed upon by Prime Minister Winston Churchill and President Roosevelt at the Second Quebec Conference. Leaks to the press about the plan led to Roosevelt denying the existence of the plan. Nevertheless, the plan strongly influenced early U.S. occupation policy, and, through the Potsdam agreement, also early Allied occupation policy.

== Publication ==
The book Germany is Our Problem was published by Harper and Brothers in October 1945. In the book, Morgenthau described his plan and the rationale for it in great detail. President Roosevelt had granted permission for the publication of the book the evening before his death, when dining with Morgenthau at Warm Springs.

In November 1945 General Dwight D. Eisenhower, the Military Governor of the U.S. Occupation Zone, approved the distribution of 1000 free copies of the book to American military officials in occupied Germany. Historian Stephen Ambrose draws the conclusion that, despite Eisenhower's later claims that the act was not an endorsement of the Morgenthau plan, Eisenhower both approved of the plan and had previously given Morgenthau at least some of his ideas on how Germany should be treated.

== Reception ==
A review in The New York Times on October 7, 1945, felt that the book was important to the survival of the U.S. people and would help prevent World War III. A review by Orville Prescott on October 5, 1945, in the same newspaper concluded that the whole world would benefit if copies of the book reached the key U.S. decision-makers responsible for policy about Germany.

== See also ==
- Society for the Prevention of World War III
- Your Job in Germany
- Germany Must Perish!
