= Lewis H. Brown =

American businessman (1894–1951)

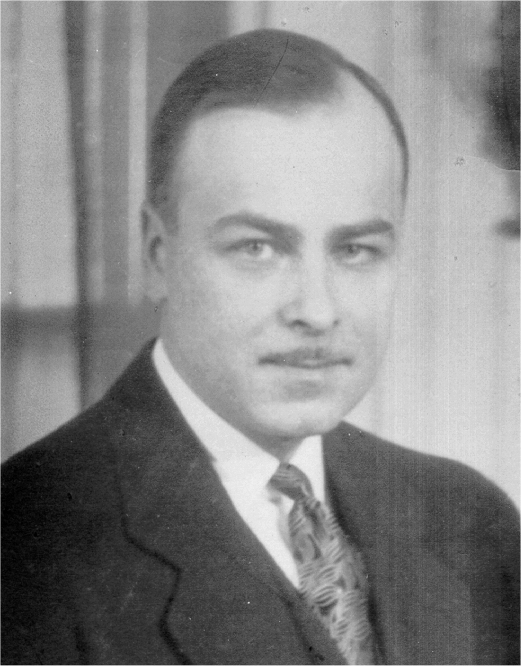
- Brown circa 1930
- Born: Lewis Herold Brown; February 13, 1894; Creston, Iowa, U.S.
- Died: February 27, 1951 (aged 57); Delray Beach, Florida, U.S.
- Occupations: Chairman & CEO, Johns-Manville Corporation

Lewis Herold Brown (February 13, 1894 – February 27, 1951) was an industrialist and former chairman of Johns Manville, once the world's largest manufacturer of asbestos and asbestos products.

== Early life and career ==
Born in Creston, Iowa on February 13, 1894, he attended the University of Iowa in 1915. Brown served in France as an infantry captain during World War I. After the war, Brown was employed by Montgomery Ward and was promoted to Assistant General Operating Manager within eight years.

== Johns-Manville and the Asbestos Institute ==
T.F. Merseles, the President of Montgomery Ward, left in 1928 to become President of asbestos manufacturer Johns Manville, taking Brown with him. Merseles died suddenly in 1930 and Brown was appointed president at the age of 35. He thereby became the youngest man ever to hold that position in the company's history. He was also President of the Asbestos Institute.

Brown was awarded The Franklin Institute's Vermilye Medal in 1938. In April 1939, Brown was featured on the cover of Time with the caption "Businessman Brown -- Public Relations Begins at Home."

Brown was awarded an honorary degree (Doctor of Laws) from Brown University in June 1943.

== A Report on Germany ==
During World War II Brown served as an advisor to General Levin H. Campbell, Jr. After World War II, at the request of General Lucius D. Clay, Brown wrote a book entitled "A Report on Germany" (Farrar, Straus and Company, New York, 1947), which served as a detailed recommendation for the reconstruction of post-war Germany, and served as a basis for the Marshall Plan.

== Later life ==
Brown founded the American Enterprise Association (AEA) in New York, a think tank which later moved to Washington, D.C., and was renamed the American Enterprise Institute. He served as AEA's chairman until his death. Brown also co-founded the Tax Foundation and served as chairman.

Brown died from a heart ailment on February 27, 1951, at age 57, in Delray Beach, Florida. He was buried in Putnam Cemetery in Greenwich, Connecticut.

== Controversy ==
In 1984, thirty-three years after Brown's death, Johns-Manville was alleged to have prioritized profits over the health and safety of employees during the time of his leadership. According to testimony given in a federal court by Charles H. Roemer, formerly an employee of Unarco, describing a meeting between Unarco officials, Lewis H. Brown and J-M attorney Vandiver Brown in the early 1940s, "I’ll never forget, I turned to Mr. Brown, one of the Browns made this crack (that Unarco managers were a bunch of fools for notifying employees who had asbestosis), and I said, ‘Mr. Vandiver Brown do you mean to tell me you would let them work until they dropped dead?’ He said, ‘Yes. We save a lot of money that way.'"

Non-profit organization positions
New office	Chair of the American Enterprise Institute; 1938–1951	Succeeded by Colby Chester
New office	President of the American Enterprise Institute; 1938–1945	Succeeded by John O'Leary
Preceded by Sinclair Weeks	President of the American Enterprise Institute; 1950–1951	Succeeded by Albert Hettinger
