= Berwick, Illinois =

- Unincorporated community
- Location within Illinois Location within the United States
- Coordinates: 40°47′57″N 90°32′18″W
- Country: United States
- State: Illinois
- County: Warren
- Established: November 8th, 1853
- Elevation: 712 ft (217 m)

Population (2020)
  - Total: 50
- Time zone: UTC-6 (Central (CST))
  - Summer (DST): UTC-5 (CDT)
- ZIP code: 61417
- Area code: 309
- GNIS feature ID: 404232

Berwick is an unincorporated community in Warren County, Illinois, United States. Berwick houses a volunteer fire department, grain elevator, and Baptist Church. Berwick has a post office with ZIP code 61417. Berwick is 9.5 miles (15.3 km) southeast of Monmouth.

== Notable people ==
- Calvin B. Hoover - noted American economist and Duke University professor. Founder of the field of comparative economic systems.
