= Comparative economic systems =

Subfield of economics comparing systems of economic organization

Comparative Economic Systems is the sub-classification of economics dealing with the comparative study of different systems of economic organization, such as capitalism, socialism, feudalism and the mixed economy. It is widely held to have been founded by the economist Calvin Bryce Hoover. Comparative economics therefore consisted mainly of comparative economic systems analysis before 1989 but substantially switched its efforts to comparison of the economic effects of the transition experience from socialism to capitalism. It is a part of economics which is the study of gaining knowledge concerned with the production, consumption and transfer of wealth. It is based on the collective wants of the population and the resources available that initially create an economic system. The performance of the economic system can be measured through gross domestic product (GDP); that is, it will indicate the growth rate of country. Normative judgments can be made as well by asking questions like whether the gap of the distribution of wealth and income and social justice. Theoreticians regularly try to evaluate both the positive and normative aspects of the economic system in general and they do so by making assumptions about the rules of the game governing utility-seeking. It is comparatively easy to predict the economic outcomes when the economic system of the country has either a perfect competition or has a perfect planning economic system. With those types of the economic systems, it is easy to offer policy guidance.

== Key roles in economic systems ==
Ethics, politics and culture play important roles in determining the performance of systems. Common cultures may prohibit or restrict individuals' satisfaction, ultimately changing the rule of the economic game while on the other hand, competitive societies may abuse of the economic system and overstimulate self-seeking. Marxist culture of the 1930s, which associated markets with labor exploitation, obligated Stalin to adopt administrative command planning, and inhibited reform until attitudes softened under Khrushchev a quarter century later.

== Merits of economic systems ==
There is no unity about right and wrong economic systems. Each type of economic system can be compared, based on a set of factors but generally, there is not a general agreement about which economic system is more right than the other. Hence, there is no single standard that is able to evaluate indisputably the merit of the economic system. Even though, facts can be gathered and models can be built to discuss the economic performance of a country, it cannot prove that any system is the best. With the proper guide, one is able to do normative assessments, that is measuring the potential, the moral and ethical reasoning of an economic system. Systems can be measured relative to the achievement of the rivals and normative assessments can be done based on statistics of the living standard, the gap of income and wealth distribution and the level of unemployment The modeling of comparative economic is strongly affected by the perceptions on which accepted cultural, political and ethical motives are the most predominant as well as the importance of the demand and supply side factors. There are three school of thoughts. The first one are comparativists - they rely on what extent does the economy depend on the market and the degree of government intervention. Others stress on motivation. Finally, most are more concerned with the interplay.

== During the Cold War ==
The comparative study of economic systems was of significant practical and political significance during the Cold War, when the relative merits of capitalist and communist systems of economic and political organization were a central topic of political concern. One of the most important early contributions was the calculation debate regarding the assertion of Ludwig von Mises that a system of central planning could never work because the information generated by a price system would never be available to planners. One response was the advocacy and partial implementation of systems of market socialism.

== The world economy after the Cold War ==
Despite huge economic inferiority, countries like Germany and Japan were at the brink of complete success before World War II. However, having a small army force and a lack of military weapons put an end to the success that was previously within their grasp during the first period of the war. Economic Systems' fundamentals changed drastically during the second period of the war. Military forces grew to be of more importance than the GDP or the population of a country. Countries that had a powerful military force could take risks and absorb the cost of mistakes and gain quantitative superiority against countries that had powerful economies but less arm-force.

The table below shows the balance post World War II.

Countries	Population, million	GDP, International dollars and 1990 prices (total$, bn)	GDP, International dollars and 1990 prices (per head$,)
United Kingdom Colonies	23.2	14.4	621
United States Colonies	15.9	23.9	1,497
French Colonies	24.1	10.9	452
Italian Colonies	8.5	2.6	304
China	1.2	1.1	917
Occupied USSR	62.4	134.2	2,150

== After 1989 ==
With the dissolution of the Soviet Union, attention shifted to problems of transition economies. With a handful of exceptions, all currently existing systems are capitalist in orientation, though the substantial economic role of the state supports the alternative view that the mixed economy has emerged as the dominant form of economic organisations.

Even in the absence of substantial differences between countries, the comparative study of economic systems of resource allocation is of considerable value in illustrating the implications of alternative methods of resource allocation, including markets, households, centralized allocation and custom.
