= The President's Economic Mission to Germany and Austria =

Series of reports

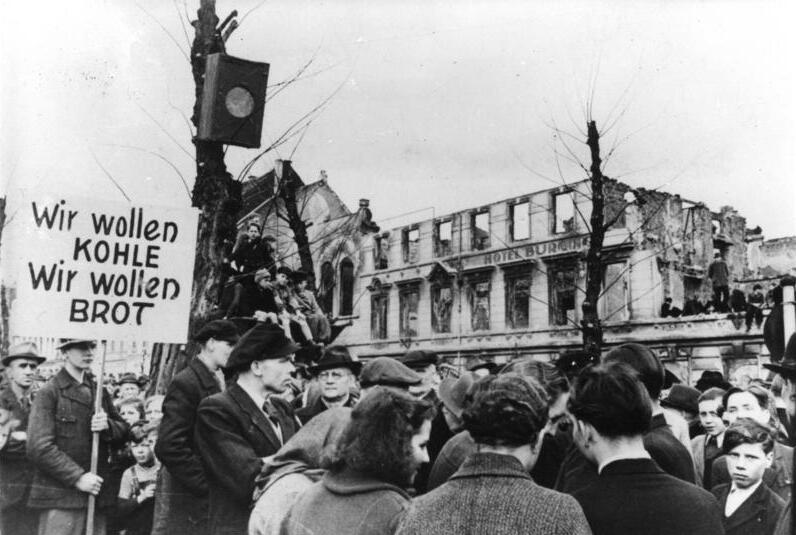
The hunger-winter of 1947, thousands protest against the disastrous food situation in Krefeld (March 31, 1947). The sign translated says, "We want coal - We want bread."

The President's Economic Mission to Germany and Austria was a series of reports commissioned by US President Harry S. Truman and written by former US President Herbert Hoover.

Based on Hoover's previous experience with Germany at the end of World War I, in January 1947 President Harry S. Truman selected Hoover to do a tour of Europe, focusing on Germany and Austria in order to ascertain the food situation of the occupied nations. Hoover toured what was to become West Germany in Reich Marshall Hermann Göring's old train coach and produced several reports sharply critical of US occupation policy.

The economy of Germany had "...sunk to the lowest level in a hundred years".

Hoover proposed a changed economic occupation policy in his reports, if nothing else but for the sake of sparing the American taxpayers the burden of supporting Central Europe indefinitely.

== Report No. 3 ==
It has been suggested that Herbert Hoover's March 1947 economic report titled "The necessary steps for promotion of German exports, so as to relieve American tax payers of the burdens of relief and for economic recovery of Europe" helped end the execution of the Morgenthau plan, particularly through the paragraph which stated: "There is the illusion that the New Germany left after the annexations can be reduced to a 'pastoral state'. It can not be done unless we exterminate or move 25,000,000 people out of it."

General Lucius Clay was of the opinion that the German economy was vital for European recovery, and had tried to use loopholes in the occupation directive JCS 1067 to pursue a less harsh deindustrialization policy in the US occupation zone than others in the US desired.

Hoover's conclusions were similar to those of the Council on Foreign Relations and those of General Clay when Hoover stated: "The whole economy of Europe is interlinked with German economy through the exchange of raw materials and manufactured goods. The productivity of Europe cannot be restored without the restoration of Germany as a contributor to that productivity."

The findings of Hoover's report that Germany should be made the engine of European recovery were endorsed by General Clay and the US War Department, but were resisted by the State Department which drafted a paper that fiercely attacked the report. The State Department position was that priority should be given to the economic and security requirements of Germany's neighbors. President Truman's assistant John R. Steelman expressed fear about reviving the "German colossus". Edwin W. Pauley, who had been industrial and commercial adviser to the Potsdam Conference and until 1947 President Truman's representative to the Allied Reparations Commission, expressed his strong dislike for the report. Pauley stated that to follow Hoover's recommendations would entail a "major reversal" of US policy and warned about future German domination of Europe.

Nevertheless, despite the fierce debate it had generated Hoover's report had made it very obvious to the US leadership that a new policy was needed; "almost any action would be an improvement" on current policy."

== Other Hoover reports ==
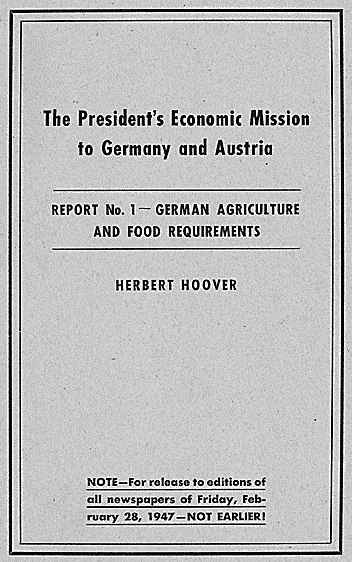
Report No. 1: German Agriculture and Food Requirements

Roughly 18 months earlier a similar report by another Hoover, Professor Calvin Hoover, had faced similar opposition.

In mid October 1945 the US Military Government in Germany submitted a 15 page report to the Allied Control Council. The report contained a lenient interpretation of the Potsdam Conference policy and advocated partial economic reconstruction.

Edwin W. Pauley labeled the proposal partly lessening the capacity restrictions on German steel production "ridiculous". General Dwight D. Eisenhower pointed out that it was an unofficial report and proceeded to criticize the critics of it for having "accepted it as policy". Eisenhower stated his position to the press as "...I say let Germany find out what it means to start a war."

The US public at the time held the (partly erroneous) belief that the decision at Potsdam had been to completely pastoralize Germany, with the exception for the occasional factory. The US public was relieved by the sharp critique and debunking of Professor Hoover's suggestion that the Potsdam policy be more leniently interpreted and German economy partly reconstructed.

== See also ==
- Restatement of Policy on Germany
- A Report on Germany
- Industrial plans for Germany
