= A Report on Germany =

1947 diplomatic report by Lewis H. Brown

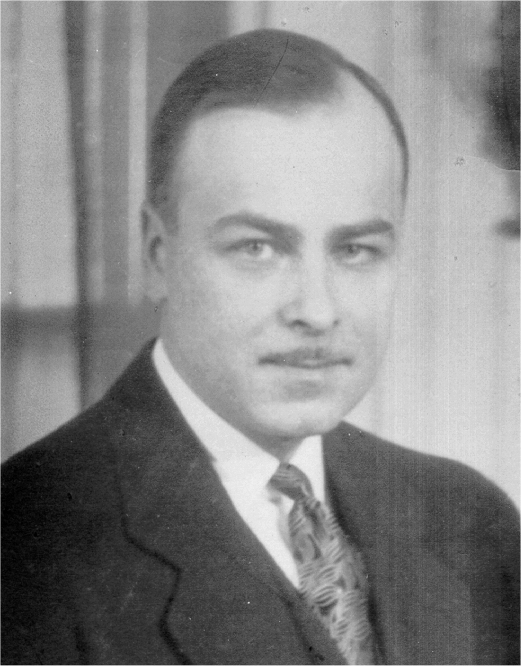
Lewis H. Brown

After World War II, in 1947 Lewis H. Brown wrote at the request of General Lucius D. Clay A Report on Germany, which served as a detailed recommendation for the reconstruction of post-war Germany, and served as a basis for the Marshall Plan. General Clay selected Brown to write the report because of Brown's broad industrial and war experience. While writing, Brown spent time in Germany, and also personally interviewed General George C. Marshall, General Dwight D. Eisenhower, General Joseph T. McNarney, General John H. Hilldring, John Foster Dulles, James F. Byrnes, former President Herbert Hoover, R. C. Lefingwell, Otto Jeidels, and former Senator Sinclair Weeks, among many others.

Chapter II of the book is a memorandum of the Johns-Manville economist William C. Bober to Lewis H. Brown entitled The German Situation Today. Chapter I Section 2 entitled Background of Policy is a re-arrangement of a study about the economic plans for Germany from 1946 by James P. Warburg with the original title Germany – Nation or No-Man’s-Land. 1947

== The European Vicious Cycle ==
Brown found out different vicious cycles in the European economies, which could affect the United States. In 1947 Western European countries were on the brink of bankruptcy, while Germany was already bankrupt. But Germany was a key part of Western Europe and Europe could not be reconstructed without doing likewise in Germany. European countries primarily trade with one another. The countries of Europe were so closely interrelated and economically interwoven, that whatever affected one inevitably affected the others. So the underproduction in the coalfields transmitted the scarcities of Britain to the rest of Europe. Only an economic entity, through which trade flows freely, regardless of boundaries, would be a prosperous Europe.

== The German Economic Destitution in 1947 ==
A fundamental challenge facing Germany was that it was now cut off from its Eastern breadbasket. Before the war the East of Germany produced 65 percent of its rye, potatoes and sugar beets, 70 percent of its brown coal and 75 percent of its potash vital for fertilizers. The farm production of Western Germany was 30 percent below prewar. In Western Germany lived 48 million people, 40 million of whom did not live on farms. The farms could only produce for 20 million people; 20 million must be fed from abroad, paid by export or by plain relief. In 1947 Germany was not able to pay for food imports from food-surplus producing countries. The Potsdam agreement and the Level-of-Industry-Plan made it impossible for Germany to function again as a converter nation and as the second greatest exporter in the world of producer goods, which helped half the world increase its level of production.

== The German Vicious Cycle ==
Germany in 1947. The lost Eastern breadbasket is shown in red and white.

Brown sketched the process of the German economic disease as follows: The Iron Curtain separated 20 million non-farm people from the Eastern breadbasket. These 20 million got only half of what it takes to keep a worker in health and vigor. The farmers produced 30 percent less than before the war, because of lack of fertilizers, seeds, equipment and machinery. Imported food could not be paid for by exports, because exports had been reduced to a trickle. Hence the German workers in the Ruhr, which was the industrial heart of Germany and likewise of Europe, got only half the food they had gotten before the war, even with American relief. Hence they accomplished half as much work as before the war. The worker produced half as much coal, which in turn caused an acute shortage of steel for the manufacturers who were supposed to produce mining machinery, locomotives, freight cars and coal barges and repair parts to restore the devastated transport-equipment of Germany.

== Plan for Reconstruction ==
Germany is to be put back on her economic feet and production must be the first objective; long range problems should not further be placed ahead of production. As long as the partition of Germany continues, Germany must export twice as much per capita from Western Germany as she did before the war in order to pay for the food necessary to feed her workers and give them energy to produce. Reparations should therefore end in August 1947. Denazification should be brought to an end. The right to return to work should be fully granted to industrial technicians, managers and skilled workers until a denazification court decides to revoke them at a later date. German militarism is dead and the taken measures will keep it dead. German Plants manufacturing munitions of war are demolished or dismantled and transferred to the victor nations as reparations. The German airplane industry is destructed. A small but highly effective inspection and control service, maintained by the Allied Governments will bring to attention any attempt to use materials for a future war. No German army will be permitted to exist.

== The vicious coal cycle ==
In Germany almost every problem starts with coal. Coal is Europe’s number two problem, exceeded only by that of food. Since Europe has only very little oil, coal is a matter of life and death to her. Great Britain, which exported in 1937 almost 53 million tons does not supply her needs in 1947 and has to import coal. In the same year West Germany exports 4.8 million tons of coal and this small amount is too large and prevents the restoration of her economy. Poland took over all of Germany’s Silesian mines which can export ten to fifteen million tons to coal deficit countries. Transportation bottlenecks, political difficulties and exchange problems have prevented deliveries from Poland.

== Reasons for the poor output of Ruhr Coal ==
=== Lack of food ===
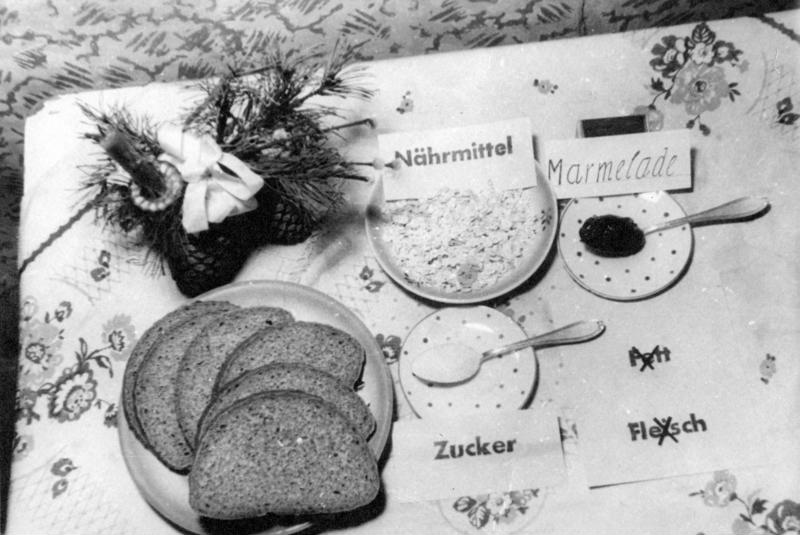
Daily diet of a German in 1947 as available with a normal ration coupon

The miner received 4,000 calories a day. The normal ration for his family members dropped from 1,550 to 750 calories. So the miner spread his additional 2,450 supplementary calories over the members of his whole family. Thus the Ruhr worker remained too hungry and too weak for effective hard work required in underground mining. Bombing of the Ruhr damaged about 45 percent of the miners’ housing, therefore commuting from great distances was common. The simplest repair parts, even nails wood and glass are lacking or are above the miners’ income at black market prices.

=== Transport ===
The coal output accumulates at the pit heads and cannot be moved. The transport system is seriously damaged by bombing and under-maintenance. Brown coal is no longer available in West Germany, since 75 percent of German brown coal lies in the Russian Zone, which is an additional catastrophe. In November 1947 only 70,000 freight cars in the U.S. Zone will be available, instead of 93,000 in January 1947. The reason is the slow rate of repairs resulting from shortage of necessary supplies as lumber, steel, asbestos packing and lagging, cotton waste for journal boxes, oil pads and spare parts of all kind. Key supply parts and even rolling stock should be shipped from the US, before the winter 1947 may have brought a complete breakdown in the transportation system.

=== A plan to break the vicious coal cycle ===
With 35 million tons of coal more per year a dynamic German economy would get going. Brown recommended two measures: At first, the former Ruhr miners, who are prisoners of war now working in French mines, where their output is low, should be brought back more rapidly. Second, each underground Ruhr miner should be offered coupons for extra tons of coal produced, so that for 50 percent increase in production he could get 75 percent increase in food for himself and his family. Food, preferably fat and meat would be brought in from America in the 27 mine stores. Third, the coal that is now exported out from Germany should be devoted to the task to break the vicious cycle in Germany. Instead of Germany, Great Britain could supply those countries now getting coal from Germany. The British miners have been struggling for years for a five-day-week and attained their long sought objective in May 1947 and work now a five day week for six days' pay. So Brown recommends, to give the British workers a special ration coupon for each ton of coal produced on Saturdays. Coupons of another color should be issued for each extra ton of coal produced on weekdays. America could supply these additional consumer goods. America could as well allocate the badly needed conveyor belts for the above ground pits and steel billets to British manufacturers of mining machinery.

== Food plan ==
The United Nations should agree upon a five-year-plan on the fundamental assumption that hard labor in the factory cannot be well done on a meager diet. Germany may need to import a billion dollars’ worth of food and agricultural necessities each year. The aim should be increasing German food consumption, increasingly paid for by Germany’s own exports. It should involve a steady decrease in American relief as Germany progressively gets upon her feet until relief ceases past five years entirely and her exports take up the full burden.

== Access to export ==
Germany must export twice as much per capita from Western Germany as she did before the war. In 1947 hundred million dollars out of 200 million dollars’ current exports is the export of German coal. Ten millions tons of coal should be used inside Germany to serve the converting industries and can therefore not get exported furthermore. There is a wide gap between necessary imports and exports to pay for raw material and food deficiencies. But even in 1947 Germany could resume her pre-war role as manufacturer of producer goods, which impressed the visitors of two splendid export exhibitions at Munich and Stuttgart. Re-sellers who knew their markets would have been glad to buy and distribute German goods. Brown recommended, that nations, which would re-establish the trade with Germany, should give parts of their currency to the International Bank for loaning this money to German industrialists. They could pay their loans back by export to these nations. Freedom should as well be given to two- or tripartite barter arrangements. The primitive method of barter can quickly bring about an exchange of goods in absence of foreign currency. Germany could pay for the raw materials, not in currency, but in workmanship in finished product. German goods were desired by Sweden and Italy, but the exchange of products, that both countries needed, was prohibited by the then existing regulations.

== Central Government, Central Bank, New Currency ==
Part of a plan for recovery in Germany is the establishment of a central provisional government. The government should have a demonstrated capacity to balance its income and outgo. Since in 1947 the Germans are not yet ready for holding an election for a parliament, the provisional government should be composed of the members of the Länderrat. These were the democratically responsible minister presidents of the several states, which have been established in each of the four zones. The Military Government should have a veto power against the selections of the Länderrat.

Concurrently with a provisional central government should be established a strong central bank for issuing a new currency. Its branch banks should be operated under a strong unified policy and by experienced central bankers. A banking system for Germany patterned after the Federal Reserve System of America would be fallacious and would not provide a central bank that will accomplish what it must do in Western Germany. European bankers have had several centuries’ experience in running central banks and are thoroughly skilled in the central banking theory on the European pattern.

A new currency should be issued with new plates for printing, so that the Russian printed currency cannot flow westward into Germany any more. Before issuing the new bank notes every effort should be made, to stimulate the production of consumer goods, so that the Germans could buy something with the new currency. A great barter market and a black market would be a great threat to the continued stability of the currency.

== Effects and legacy ==
The recommendations were gradually put into practice. In a Revised Plan for Level of Industry in the Anglo-American Zones the United States and Great Britain agreed to substantially increase the imports to 2.0 billion dollars and the export to 2.01 billion dollars. The overriding requirement of the plan has been to provide the level of industry necessary to make the area self-supporting. Therefore the annual production of billet steel was fixed at 10.7 million tons in 1947 instead of 5.8 million tons in 1946. The reconstruction of Western Europe created economies capable of a quick catch-up. The following influence of the Marshall Plan triggered Postwar Europe’s “supergrowth”. Brown recommended, that the other European nations qualifying for the Marshall-Plan should engage likewise in a diligent search for vital and important sectors of their economy, that were being blocked by shortages that produce vicious cycles that effects not only their economy, but that of all Europe. Emphasis should be given to minor crucial shortages like the conveyor belt shortage in Great Britain and the under-maintained journal boxes in the Ruhr area.

== See also ==
- Allied plans for German industry after World War II
- The President's Economic Mission to Germany and Austria
- Restatement of Policy on Germany
