= Restatement of Policy on Germany =

1946 speech by U.S. Secretary of State Byrnes

1946 newsreel

"Restatement of Policy on Germany", or the "Speech of Hope", is a speech given by James F. Byrnes, the US secretary of state, in Stuttgart on September 6, 1946.

The speech set the tone of future US policy, as it repudiated the economic policies of the Morgenthau Plan, and its message of a change to a policy of economic reconstruction gave the Germans hope for the future.

Due to a controversial comment about the Polish-German post-war border, favoring Germany, the speech improved German-American relations while simultaneously worsening Polish-American ones.

== Context and speech ==
The Western powers' worst fear by now was that the poverty and hunger envisioned by the Morgenthau Plan would drive the Germans to communism. American Occupation General Lucius D. Clay stated, "There is no choice between being a communist on 1,500 calories a day and a believer in democracy on a thousand".

The speech was also seen as a first firm stand against the Soviet Union as it stated the intention of the United States to maintain a military presence in Europe indefinitely. However, the heart of the message was, as Byrnes stated a month later, "The nub of our program was to win the German people... it was a battle between us and Russia over minds...."

On the question of territorial integrity of Germany, it was stated that "the United States will not support any encroachment on territory which is indisputably German or any division of Germany which is not genuinely desired by the people concerned. So far as the United States is aware the people of the Ruhr area and the Rhineland desire to remain united with the rest of Germany. And the United States is not going to oppose their desire."

A stated exception to US support for self-determination was the support given in the speech to the French claim to the Saarland.

Byrnes, who accepted Western Neisse as the provisional Polish border, also addressed the Polish and Soviet claims to all German territory east of the Oder-Neisse line, an area comprising roughly 25% of pre-war (1937) Germany.

In his speech, he left the final extent of the area east of the Oder Neisse that would become permanently Polish to be decided in the future:

"The Soviets and the Poles suffered greatly at the hands of Hitler's invading armies. As a result of the agreement at Yalta, Poland ceded to the Soviet Union territory east of the Curzon Line. Because of this, Poland asked for revision of her northern and western frontiers. The United States will support revision of these frontiers in Poland's favor. However, the extent of the area to be ceded to Poland must be determined when the final settlement is agreed upon."

Byrnes, in fact, did not state that such a change would take place. The purpose of the speech and associated US diplomatic activities was as propaganda aimed at Germany by the Western Powers, which could then blame the Polish-German border and the German expulsions on Moscow alone.

== Polish response ==
The speech had a negative impact on US relations with Poland, where it strengthened the position of Polish communists before the upcoming elections in Poland which would cement their control of the country. The Polish government of that time, already dominated by the communists, responded to the speech with loud rhetoric, with claims that the US was supporting remnants of the Hitler regime. It officially claimed that the border set at Potsdam was final. In a speech, Polish communist leader Władysław Gomułka condemned Byrnes' speech and its implication of a border revision in favor of Germany as reactionary. It made Gomulka see it as further need for a strong Polish-Soviet alliance.

Many years later, another Polish communist leader Wojciech Jaruzelski would reflect on the implications of the speech:

It was a shocking statement. It made us think that our western border was being questioned by the Germans and by other Western countries. It was one of the most important things that strengthened our ties with the Soviet Union.

Olszewski asked the US ambassador to Poland for an explanation and claimed that the speech would have a negative impact on the Poles from beyond Curzon Line that were moving into western territories. Ambassador Arthur Bliss Lane tried to reassure Poles that Byrnes' speech should not be interpreted as Americans' desire to avoid their obligations made at Potsdam. He underlined that Poland was given provisional control over the area, and if the Polish settlers believed that their presence was permanent, it was because of the work of Polish government and the press itself. Lane later continued to reassure Poles of US friendship and was disturbed by distortion of Byrnes' speech. Eventually, he learned, after discussing the issue with members of Department of State, that the speech was intended to "smoke out Molotov's attitude on the eve of elections in Germany".

From November 1946, onward the US military government in Germany prepared a number of new alternative border plans. U.S. Secretary of State George Marshall insisted during the 1947 Council of Foreign Ministers meetings in Moscow and London that a border revision be done that would return agricultural areas Pomerania and Silesia to Germany while leaving Poland large part of eastern Pomerania and Upper Silesia, as well as Gdańsk and East Prussia. With backing from the UK and from France, he also advocated the establishment of a four-power commission that would be given the task of deciding the extent of the new border revisions in favor of Germany. The American change of tactic was motivated by two things: winning over German loyalties and embarrassing the Soviet Union; in private, American policy makers like Marshall admitted that chances of changing the border were "very slender".

While worsening Polish-American relations, on the other hand, the speech made the Germans more positive to the US, and the Soviet Union was forced to commit itself to the Oder-Neisse line. As a consequence of this commitment, the Soviet Union had to give up any hope of gaining influence over West Germany.

== See also ==
- The President's Economic Mission to Germany and Austria
- A Report on Germany
- London Agreement on German External Debts
