= Anna Myszyńska =

Silesian writer (1931–2019)

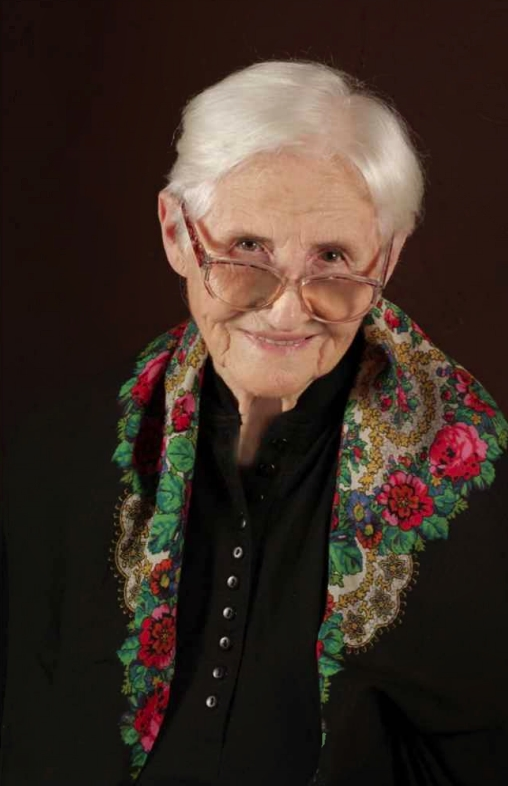
- Born: Anna Elżbieta Schneider; 30 June 1931; Kórnica, Upper Silesia, Weimar Republic (modern-day Poland)
- Died: 30 September 2019 (aged 88); Nysa, Upper Silesia, Poland
- Resting place: Biała cemetery
- Occupations: Writer, photographer, poet
- Writing career
- Language: Silesian

Anna Elżbieta Myszyńska (Polish pronunciation: [ˈan.na mɨʂɨɲ.ska]); née Schneider; 30 June 1931 – 30 September 2019) was a Silesian writer, photographer, poet, translator and a promoter of Silesian language and tradition.

== Life ==
Myszyńska was born in Kórnica, Upper Silesia on 30 June 1931. She finished primary school in 1945. After the end of World War II, she worked for several years on her parents' farm and on a farm in Lipno, Prudnik. She didn't attend school because she didn't know Polish, only Silesian. It was not until 1952 that she went to a nursing school in Racibórz, which she graduated as an autodidactist with honors, and got a job at a hospital in Opole. In 1957, she graduated from the State School of Midwives in Nysa.

She moved to Biała. She took up photography thanks to her husband, Bogdan Myszyński, with whom she ran a photography studio. After retiring, she became a photojournalist for the "Panorama Bialska" newspaper. She took part in the Silesian dialect competition "Po naszymu, czyli po śląsku", organized by Polish Radio Katowice. She started writing short stories in Silesian "Jak to piyrwej było" for the newspaper, in which she recalled her childhood, youth, church holidays, old customs and rituals related to the seasons and work in the countryside, while comparing them to the present day. Due to the lack of a separate alphabet for Silesian back then, she wrote the text in the way she spoke and heard herself in Polish alphabet. In 1994, she received a proposal from Polish Radio Opole to cooperate in the program "Nasz Heimat" conducted by the editor Andrzej Russak for the German minority. She was the originator of the Silesian Language Competition in Prudnik. She collaborated with "Tygodnik Prudnicki", for which she translated into Polish the content of the novel Summer of Dead Dreams by Harry Thürk. She also translated Romeo and Juliet into Silesian.

She died on 7 September 2019 in the hospice in Nysa.
