= Flight and expulsion of Germans from Poland during and after World War II =

Aspect of mid-20th century history

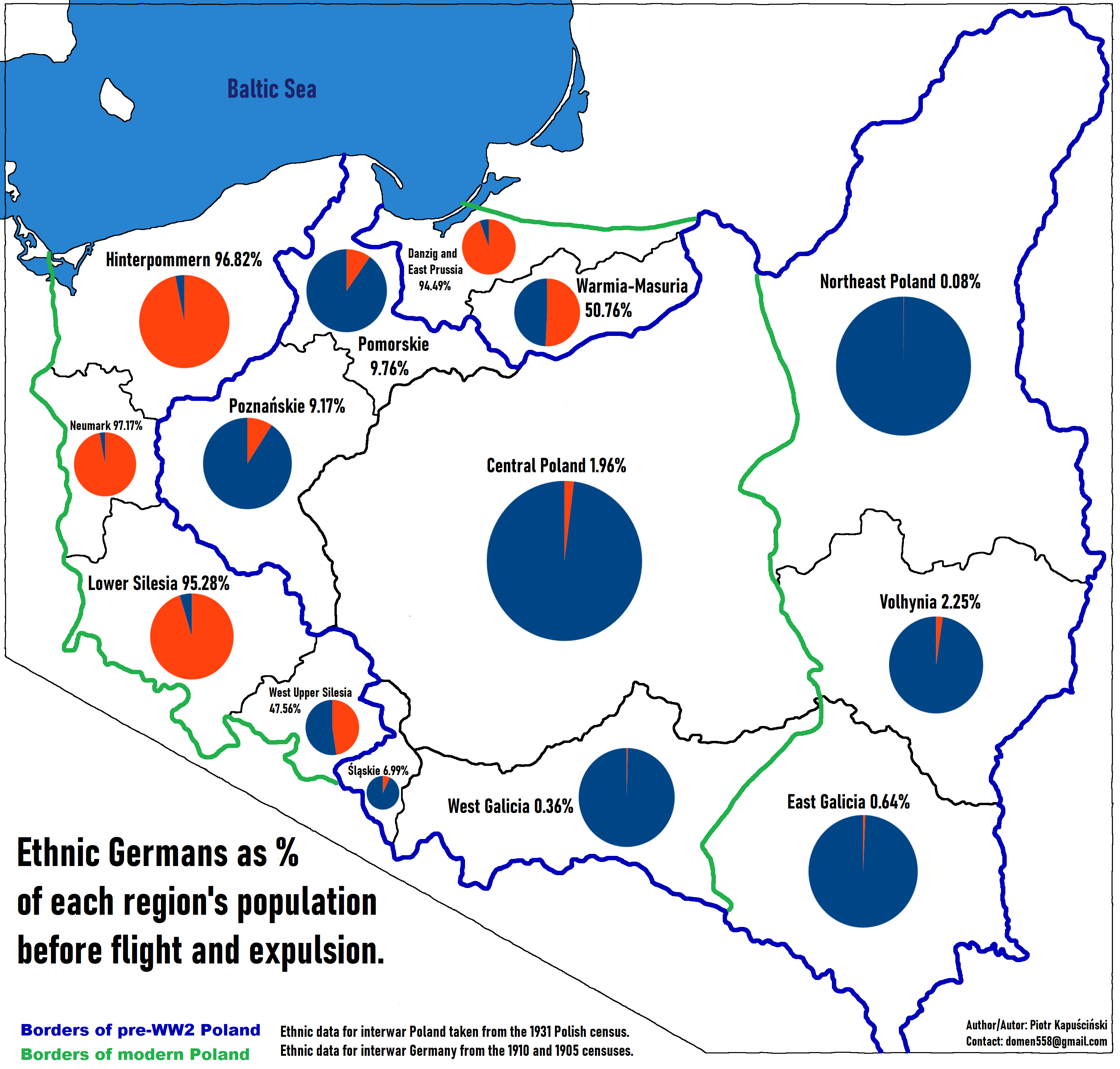
Germans as percent of population before the flight and expulsion

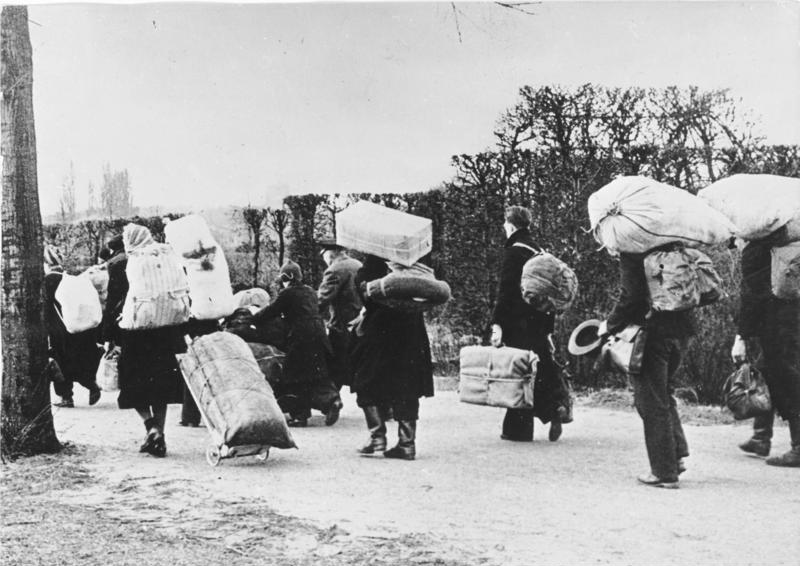
Germans leaving Silesia for Allied-occupied Germany in 1945. Courtesy of the German Federal Archives (Deutsches Bundesarchiv).

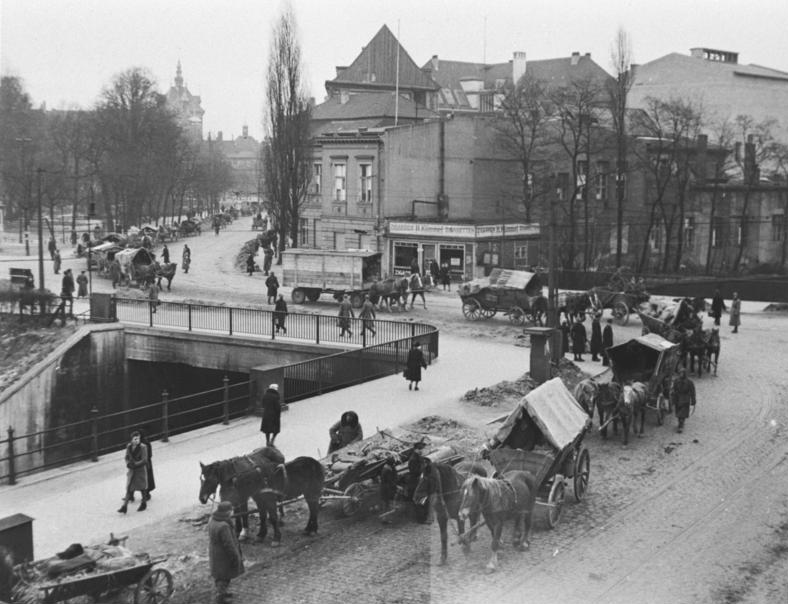
Refugee trek, in Danzig and the surrounding area, February 1945

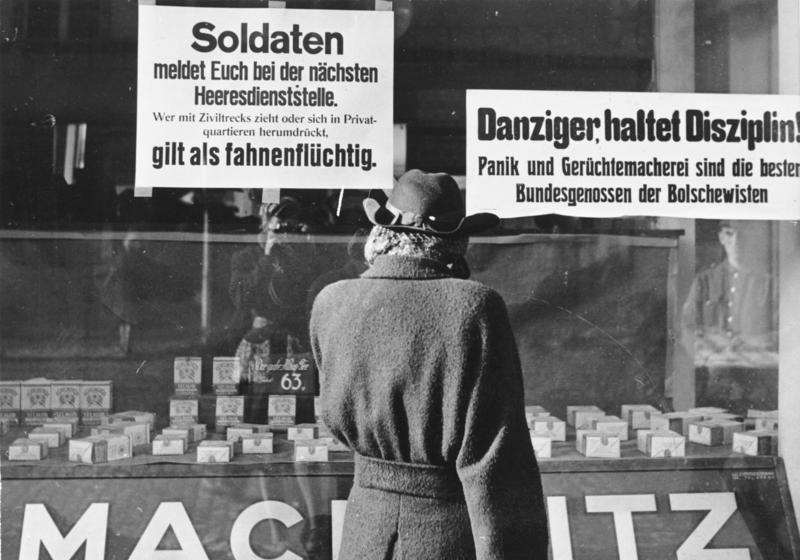
Propaganda signs, Danzig, February 1945: "Panic and rumours are the best allies of the Bolshevists!"

The flight and expulsion of Germans from Poland was the largest of a series of flights and expulsions of Germans in Europe during and after World War II. The German population fled or was expelled from all regions which are currently within the territorial boundaries of Poland: including the former eastern territories of Germany annexed by Poland after the war and parts of pre-war Poland; despite acquiring territories from Germany, the Poles themselves were also expelled from the former eastern territories of Poland annexed by the Soviet Union. West German government figures of those evacuated, migrated, or expelled by 1950 totaled 8,129,800 (6,981,000 from the former eastern territories of Germany; 290,800 from Danzig, 688,000 from pre-war Poland and 170,000 Baltic Germans resettled in Poland during the war). Research by the West German government put the figure of Germans emigrating from Poland from 1951 to 1982 at 894,000; they are also considered expellees under German Federal Expellee Law.

The German population east of Oder-Neisse was estimated at over 11 million in early 1945. The first mass flight of Germans followed the Red Army's advance and was composed of both spontaneous flight driven by Soviet atrocities, and organised evacuation starting in the summer of 1944 and continuing through to the spring of 1945. Overall about 1% (100,000) of the German civilian population east of the Oder–Neisse line perished in the fighting prior to the surrender in May 1945. In 1945, the eastern territories of Germany as well as Polish areas annexed by Germany were occupied by the Soviet Red Army and communist Polish military forces. German civilians were also sent as "reparation labor" to the USSR. The Soviet Union transferred former German territories in the east of the Oder–Neisse line to Poland in July 1945. In mid-1945, 4.5 to 4.6 million Germans remained on the territories that were given under Polish control pending a final peace conference with Germany, which eventually never took place.

Early expulsions in Poland were undertaken by the Soviet-backed communist military authorities in Poland even before the Potsdam Conference ("wild expulsions"), to ensure the later integration into an ethnically homogeneous Poland as envisioned by the Polish communists. Between seven hundred and eight hundred thousand Germans were affected. Contrary to the official declaration that the former German inhabitants of the so-called Recovered Territories had to be removed quickly to house Poles displaced by the Soviet annexation, the lands initially faced a severe population shortage.

By early 1946, 932,000 people had been "verified" as having Polish nationality. In the February 1946 census, 2,288,000 persons were listed as Germans and 417,400 became subject to verification aiming at the establishment of nationality. From the spring of 1946 the expulsions gradually became better organised, affecting the remaining German population. By 1950, 3,155,000 German civilians had been expelled and 1,043,550 were naturalised as Polish citizens. Germans considered "indispensable" for the Polish economy were retained; virtually all had left by 1960. Some 500,000 Germans in Poland, East Prussia, and Silesia were employed as forced labor in communist-administered camps prior to being expelled from Poland. Besides large camps, some of which were re-used German concentration camps, numerous other forced labour, punitive and internment camps, urban ghettos, and detention centres sometimes consisting only of a small cellar were set up.

The attitude of Polish civilians, many of whom had experienced brutalities during the preceding German occupation, was varied. There were incidents when Poles, even freed slave labourers, protected Germans, for example by disguising them as Poles. The attitude of the Soviet soldiers was ambivalent. A number of them committed numerous atrocities, most prominently rapes and murders, and did not always distinguish between Poles and Germans, often mistreating them alike. Other Soviets were taken aback by the brutal treatment of the Germans and engaged in their protection. According to the West German Schieder commission of 1953, the civilian death toll was 2 million. However, in 1974 the German Federal Archives estimated a death toll of about 400,000 (including the victims of those deported from Kaliningrad).

== Background ==
=== Historical background ===
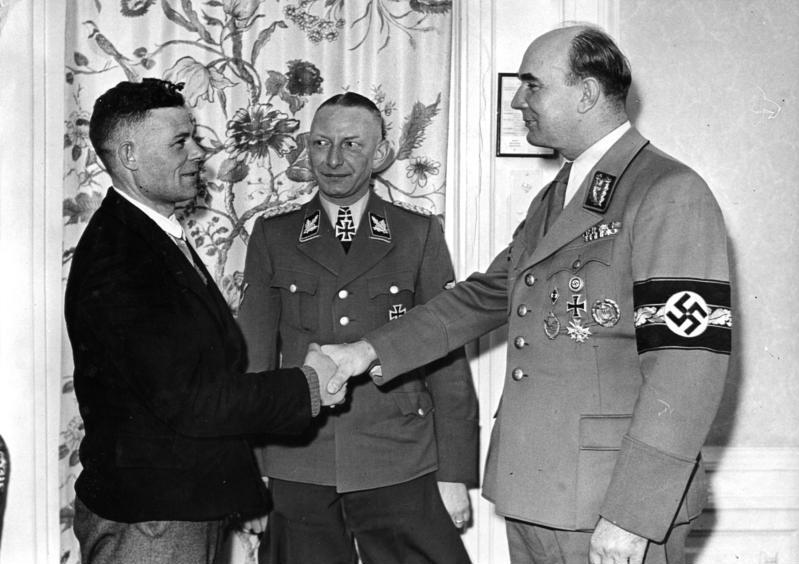
Nazi official Arthur Greiser welcoming millionth German colonist in occupied Poland, March 1944.

German settlement in the former eastern territories of Germany and pre-war Poland dates back to the medieval Ostsiedlung. Nazi Germany used the presence and the alleged persecution of Volksdeutsche as propaganda tools in preparation for the invasion of Poland in 1939. With the invasion, Poland was partitioned between Germany and the Soviet Union according to the Molotov–Ribbentrop Pact. This was followed by population exchanges and included Baltic Germans who were settled in occupied Poland.

The Nazis' Generalplan Ost strategy for Central and Eastern Europe envisioned the creation of a Greater Germany, which was to be built through removing a variety of non-Germans from Poland and other areas in Central and Eastern Europe, mainly Slavs and Jews believed by Nazis to be subhuman. These non-Germans were targeted for slave labor and eventual extermination. While Generalplan Ost's settlement ambitions did not come into full effect due to the war's turn, millions of Germans, mostly from Central and Eastern Europe, were settled by the Nazis to replace Poles removed or killed during the occupation. Germany deported millions of Poles either to other territories, to concentration camps or as slave workers. A number of others were deported by the Soviet Union during the years 1939-1941, when Germany and Soviet Union cooperated against Poles.

German communities living within the pre-war borders of Poland participated in wartime German activities, starting with the invasion of Poland. Created on order of Reichsführer-SS Heinrich Himmler, a Nazi ethnic German organisation called Selbstschutz carried out mass murder during Intelligenzaktion alongside operational groups of German military and police. In addition, the German minority engaged in such activities as identifying Poles for execution and illegally detaining them. To Poles, moving Germans out of Poland was seen as an attempt to avoid such events in the future and, as a result, the Polish government in exile proposed a population transfer of Germans as early as 1941.

During World War II, expulsions were initiated by Nazi Germany in occupied Poland. The Germans deported 2.478 million Polish citizens from the Polish areas annexed by Nazi Germany, murdered 1.8 to 2.77 million ethnic Poles and another 2.7 to 3 million Polish Jews, and resettled 1.3 million ethnic Germans in their place. Around 500,000 Germans were stationed in Poland as part of its occupation force; these consisted of people such as clerks, technicians and support staff.

=== Allied decisions: Tehran, Yalta and Potsdam conferences ===
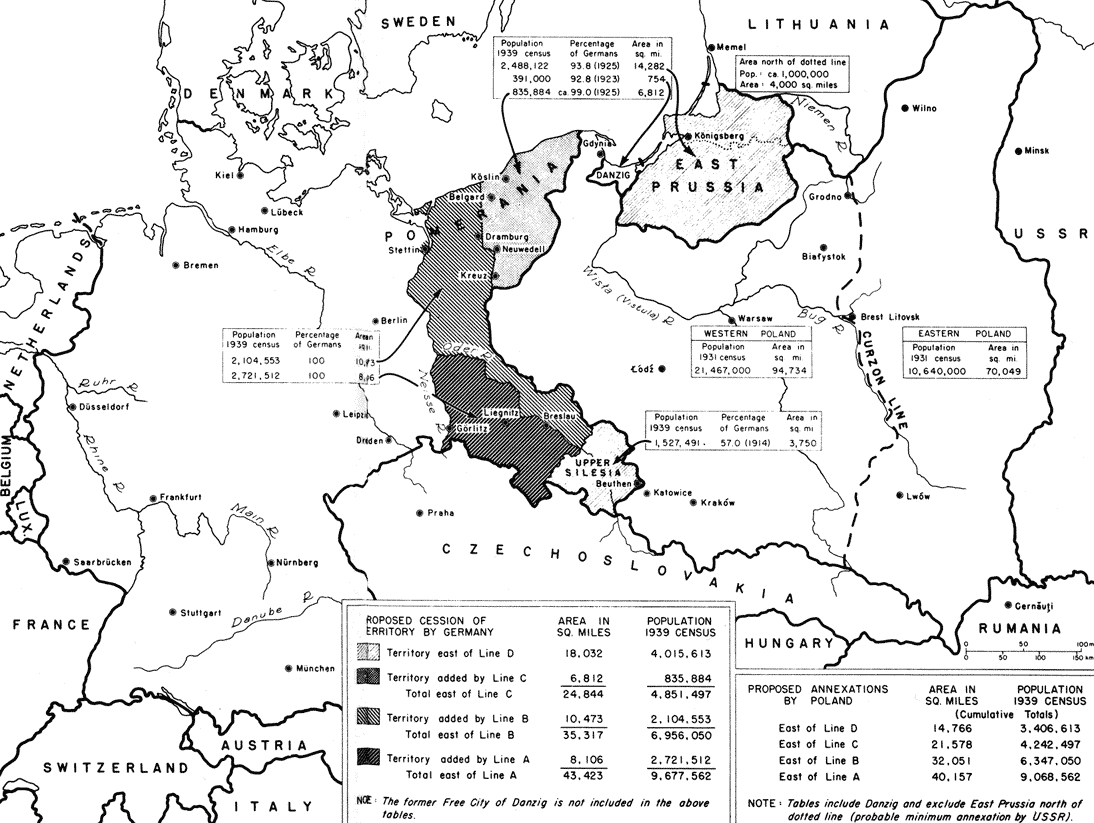
Allied map used to determine the number of Germans that would have to be expelled from the eastern German territories using different border scenarios (based on German pre-war census)

Representatives of the Polish Government were not present at any of those conferences and felt betrayed by their western Allies who decided about future Polish borders behind their backs.

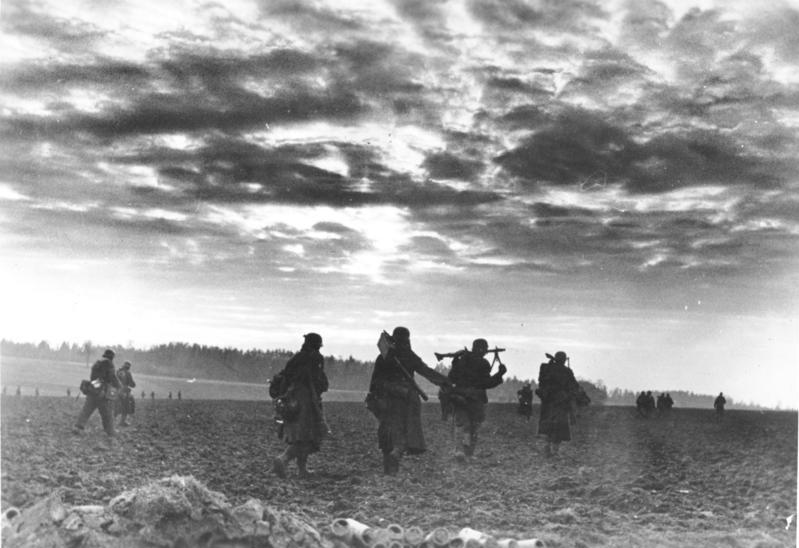
Retreating Wehrmacht, eastern Germany, March 1945

Following the Tehran Conference (November–December 1943) Joseph Stalin and Winston Churchill made it clear that the Soviets would keep the Polish territories east of the Curzon Line and offered Poland territorial compensation in the West. The final decision to move Poland's boundary westward, preconditioning the expulsion of Germans, was made by Britain, the Soviet Union, and the United States at the Yalta Conference in February 1945, when the Curzon line was irrevocably fixed as the future Polish-Soviet border. The precise location of the Polish western border was left open and, though basically the Allies had agreed on population transfers, the extent remained questioned. Concerning the post-war western frontier of Poland, the agreement simply read: "If a specific problem such as the frontiers of liberated Poland and the complexion of its government allowed no easy solution, hopes were held out for the future discussion of all outstanding problems in an amicable manner." Upon gaining control of these lands, the Soviet and Polish-Communist authorities started to expel the German population.

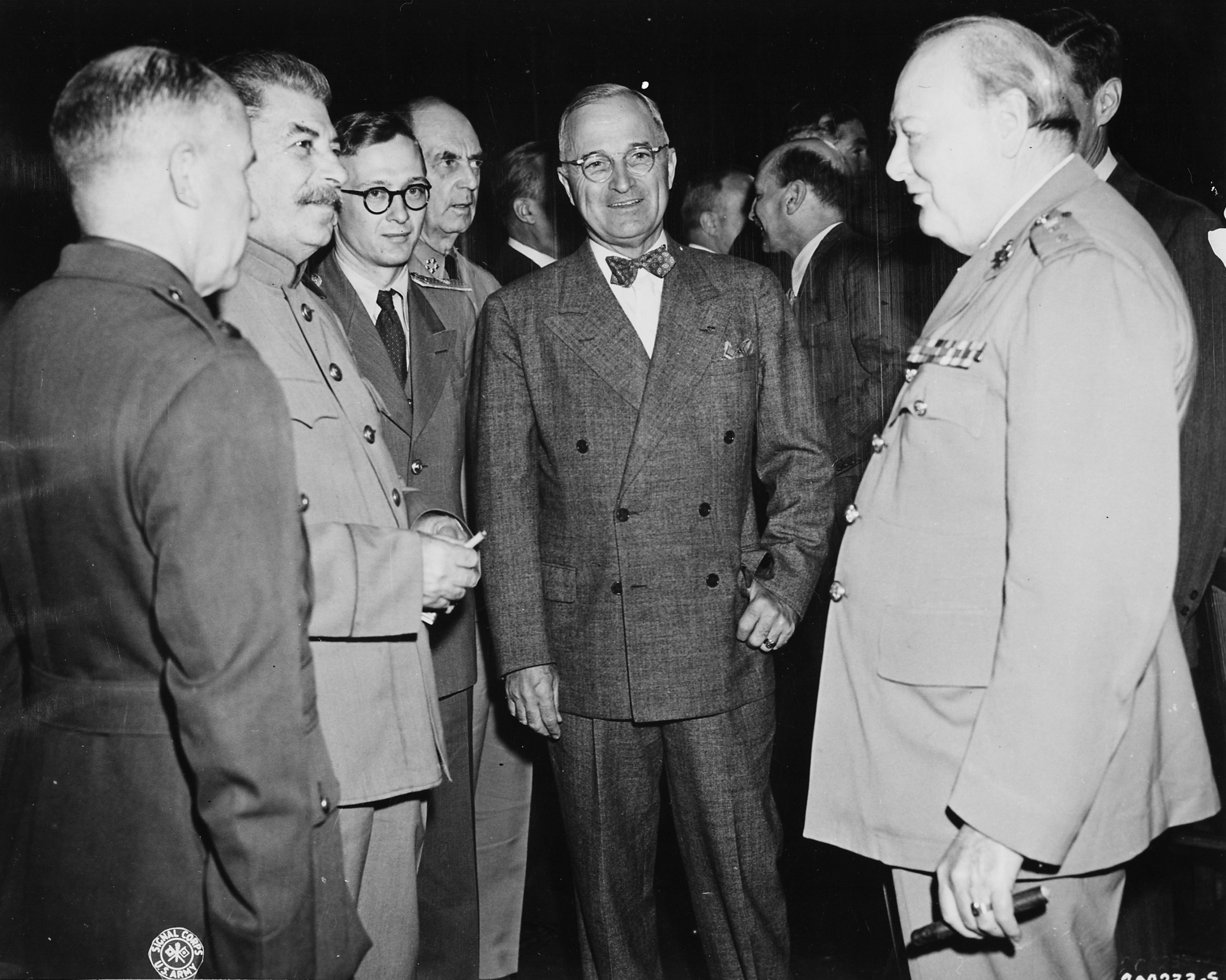
Potsdam Conference: Joseph Stalin (left), Harry Truman (center), Winston Churchill (right)

In July 1945, at the Potsdam Conference, the Allies placed most former eastern territories of Germany east of the Oder–Neisse line under Polish administration. Article XIII concerning the transfer of Germans was adopted at the Potsdam Conference in July 1945. It was an emergency measure, drafted and adopted in great haste, a response to the wild expulsions of Germans from Czechoslovakia and Poland, which had created a chaotic situation in the American and British zones of occupation. The Soviet Union transferred territories to the east of the Oder–Neisse line to Poland in July 1945. Subsequently, most of the remaining Germans were expelled to the territories west of the line.

President Harry S. Truman complained that there were now five occupation zones because the Soviets had turned over the area extending along the Oder and western Neisse to Poland and was concerned about Germany's economic control and war reparations. Churchill spoke against giving Poland control over an area in which some eight million Germans lived. Stalin insisted that the Germans had all fled and that the Poles were needed to fill the vacuum. On July 24, the Polish communist delegation arrived in Berlin, insisting on the Oder and western Neisse rivers as the frontier, and they vehemently argued their case before the foreign ministers, Churchill, and Truman, in turn. The next day Churchill warned Stalin: "The Poles are driving the Germans out of the Russian zone. That should not be done without considering its effect on the food supply and reparations. We are getting into a position where the Poles have food and coal, and we have the mass of (the) population thrown at us." To the Soviets, reparations were more important than boundaries, and Stalin might have given up on the Poles if they had not so vociferously protested when, in spite of his 'illness', he consulted with them during the evening of July 29.

=== Polish attitudes ===
With German communities living within the pre-war borders of Poland, there was an expressed fear of disloyalty of Germans in Eastern Upper Silesia and Pomerelia, based on wartime German activities. As Germany invaded Poland, the German minority engaged in mass murder, rapes and plunder of Polish citizens, in addition to making lists of people that were to be sent to German concentration camps. Poles wanted to avoid such events in the future and as a result, Polish exile authorities proposed a population transfer of Germans as early as 1941.

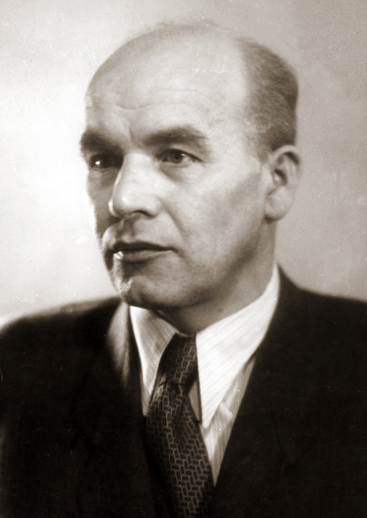
Władysław Gomułka organized transport of Germans to occupied Germany in Ministry for the Recovered Territories

In 1941, Władysław Sikorski of the Polish government-in-exile insisted on driving "the German horde (...) back far [westward]", while in 1942 memoranda he expressed concern about Poland acquiring Lower Silesia, populated with "fanatically anti-Polish Germans". Yet as the war went on, Lower Silesia also became a Polish war aim, as well as occupation of the Baltic coast west of Szczecin as far as Rostock and occupation of the Kiel Canal. Expulsions of Germans from East Prussia and pre-war Poland had become a war aim as early as in February 1940, expressed by Polish Foreign Minister August Zaleski.

After Sikorski's death, the next Polish Prime Minister Stanisław Mikołajczyk in a letter to Roosevelt expressed his concerns about the idea of compensating Poland in the west. However, pressed by Churchill, he was forced to accept the Tehran decision, which was the direct cause of his resignation from his post. The next Polish Prime Minister, Tomasz Arciszewski claimed that Poland did not "want neither Breslau nor Stettin".

Although the Polish government-in-exile was recognised by the Allies at that time, the Soviet Union broke off all diplomatic relations with it in April 1943 after Polish government demanded the investigation of the Katyn massacre. On April 20, 1944, in Moscow, the Soviet sponsored Polish Communist cell founded the Polish Committee of National Liberation (PKWN) on Stalin's initiative. Just one week later the representatives of the PKWN and the Soviet Union signed a treaty regulating the new Polish-Soviet border. A year later, before the Potsdam Conference, the western Allies followed Stalin, recognized the Soviet-sponsored government, which accepted the shift of the borders westwards, and withdrew their recognition for the Polish government-in-exile. Poles were classified as sub-humans (Untermenschen) by the Nazis, with their ultimate fate being slavery and extermination, while Germans occupied position of privileged "Uebermenschen" that were to rule over Poles and other nations; when Stanisław Mikołajczyk joined the "Government of National Unity" as a deputy prime minister in 1945, he justified the expulsions of Germans by national terms following communist Władysław Gomułka, but also as a revolutionary act, freeing the Poles of exploitation by a German middle and upper class.

In general, the Polish historiography views the expulsion of Germans as justified and correct, even when describing it as a "lesser evil".

== Flight and evacuation following the Red Army's advance ==
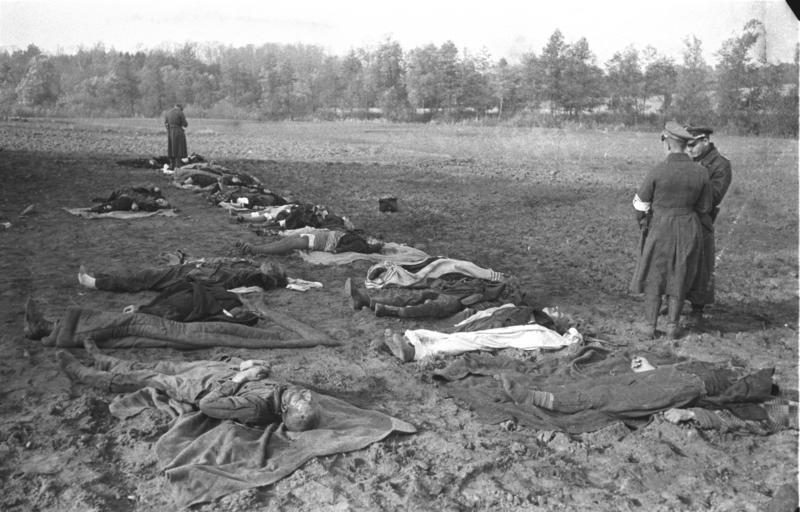
Dead Germans in Nemmersdorf, East Prussia. Soviet atrocities, exaggerated and spread by Nazi propaganda, fueled the spontaneous flight of the German population.

The majority of German citizens and ethnic Germans who left the area of post-war Poland fled or were evacuated before the arrival of Polish authorities. After the Red Army had advanced into the eastern parts of post-war Poland in the Lublin–Brest Offensive, launched on 18 July 1944, Soviet spearheads first reached eastern German territory on 4 August 1944 at northeastern East Prussia and Memelland, causing a first wave of refugees.

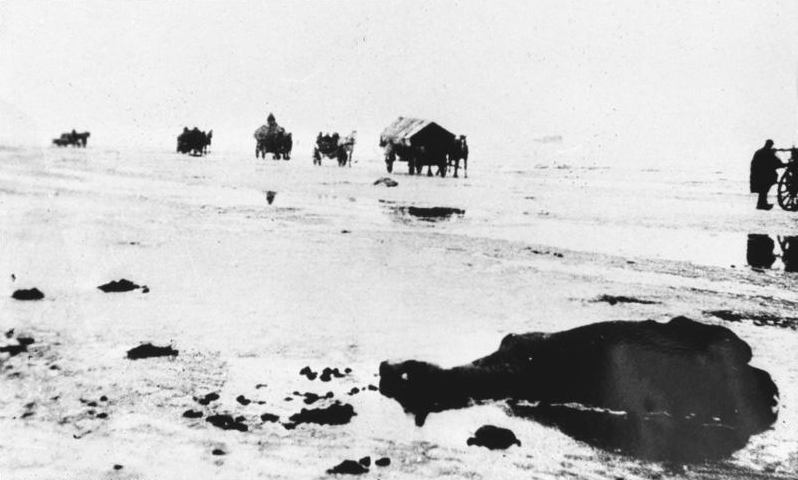
Refugees cross the frozen Vistula Lagoon, 1945

With the Soviet Vistula–Oder Offensive, launched on 12 January 1945, and the parallel East Prussian Offensive launched on 13 January 1945, Soviet gains of pre-war German and annexed Polish territory became permanent. With the subsequent East Pomeranian, Lower Silesian and Upper Silesian Offensives in February and March, the Red Army seized control of virtually all territories east of the Oder river. Wehrmacht counter-offensives like Operation Solstice and Operation Gemse were repelled, and only shrinking pockets like Breslau, Danzig, Heiligenbeil, Hela, Kolberg, Königsberg, and Pillau remained German controlled. Soviet soldiers committed reprisal rapes and other crimes In most cases, implementation of the evacuation plans was delayed until Soviet and Allied forces had defeated the German forces and advanced into the areas to be evacuated. The responsibility for leaving millions of Germans in these vulnerable areas until combat conditions overwhelmed them can be attributed directly to the draconian measures taken by the German authorities against anyone even suspected of 'defeatist' attitudes [as evacuation was considered] and the fanaticism of multiple Nazi functionaries in their execution of Hitler's 'no retreat' orders. Hitler and his staff refused to accept Soviet military superiority. Hitler called the Red Army "gleaned punks" and "booty divisions", who were not able to win decisive battles. Himmler called the preparation of the early 1945 Soviet offensive "the biggest bluff since Dshingis Khan".

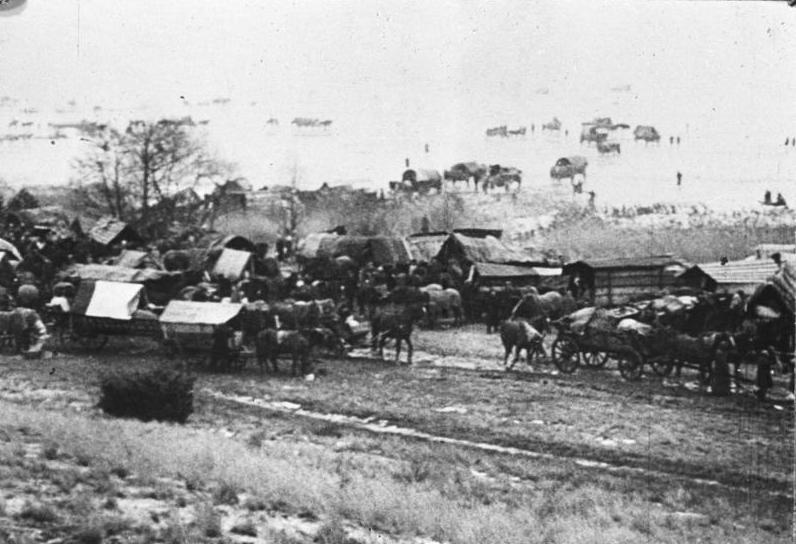
Refugee trek in East Prussia, March 1945

The first mass movement of German civilians in the eastern territories was composed of both spontaneous flight and organized evacuation, starting in the summer of 1944 and continuing through the early spring of 1945. Conditions turned chaotic in the winter, when miles-long queues of refugees pushed their carts through the snow trying to stay ahead of the Red Army. From the Baltic coast, thousands were evacuated by ship in Operation Hannibal. Since February 11, refugees were shipped not only to German ports, but also to German occupied Denmark, based on an order issued by Hitler on 4 February. Of 1,180 ships participating in the evacuation, 135 were lost due to bombs, mines, and torpedoes, an estimated 20,000 died. Between 23 January 1945 and the end of the war, 2,204,477 people, 1,335,585 of them civilians, were transported via the Baltic Sea, up to 250,000 of them to occupied Denmark.

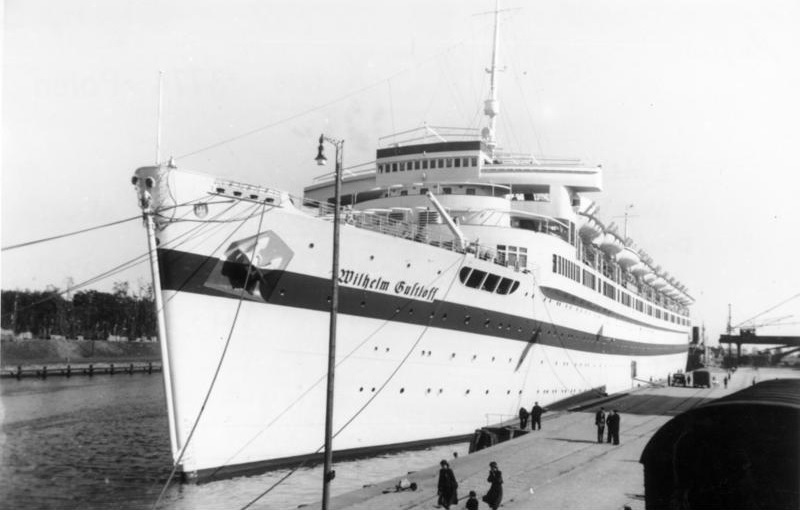
When the land evacuation routes were already intercepted by the Red Army, tens of thousands remaining German military personnel and civilians were evacuated by ship in Operation Hannibal. Depicted military transport ship Wilhelm Gustloff was sunk by a Soviet submarine, 9,000 drowned.

Most of the evacuation efforts commenced in January 1945, when Soviet forces were already at the eastern border of Germany. About six million Germans had fled or were evacuated from the areas east of the Oder–Neisse line before Soviet and the attached Polish Army took control of the region. Refugee treks and ships which came into reach of the advancing Soviets suffered high casualties when targeted by low-flying aircraft, torpedoes, or were rolled over by tanks. The most infamous incidents during the flight and expulsion from the territory of later Poland include the sinking of the military transport ship Wilhelm Gustloff by a Soviet submarine with a death toll of some 9,000 people; the USAF bombing of refugee-crowded Swinemünde on 12 March 1945 killing an estimated 23,000 to 25,000; the desperate conditions under which refugees crossed the frozen Vistula Lagoon, where thousands broke in, froze to death, or were killed by Soviet aircraft; and the poorly organized evacuation and ultimate sacrifice of refugee-crowded Breslau by the local German Nazi authorities headed by gauleiter Karl Hanke. The Polish historians Witold Sienkiewicz and Grzegorz Hryciuk maintain that civilian deaths in the flight and evacuation were "between 600,000 and 1.2 million. The main causes of death were cold, stress, and bombing".

The Nazi German Ministry for Inner Affairs passed a decree on 14 March 1945 allowing abortion to women raped by Soviet soldiers.

== Behind the frontline ==
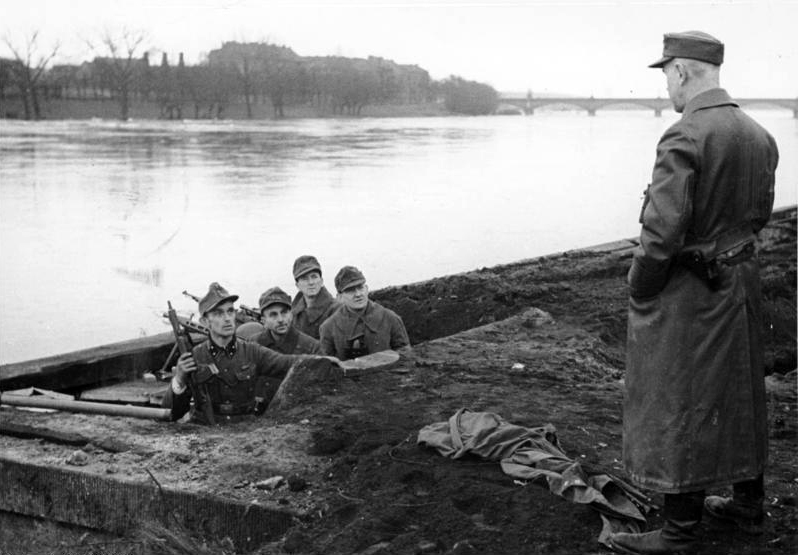
Volkssturm receiving orders to defend the Oder, Frankfurt an der Oder (today a border town), February 1945

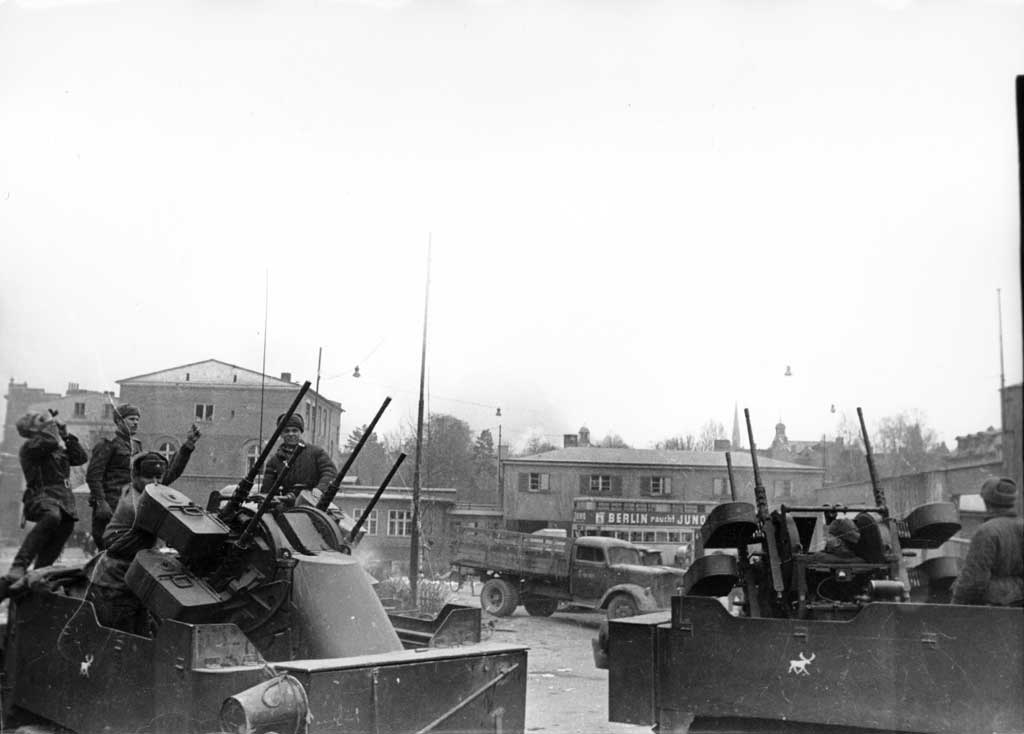
Soviet forces enter Danzig (Gdansk), March 1945

Many refugees tried to return home when the fighting in their homelands ended. Before June 1, 1945, some 400,000 crossed back over the Oder and Neisse rivers eastward, before Soviet and Polish communist authorities closed the river crossings; another 800,000 entered Silesia from Czechoslovakia.

The Polish courier Jan Karski warned US President Franklin Delano Roosevelt of the possibility of Polish reprisals, describing them as "unavoidable" and "an encouragement for all the Germans in Poland to go west, to Germany proper, where they belong".

=== Deportation to the Soviet Union ===
On February 6, 1945, Soviet NKVD ordered mobilisation of all German men (17 to 50 years old) in the Soviet-controlled territories. A number of them were then transported to the Soviet Union for forced labour. In the former German territories the Soviet authorities did not always distinguish between the Poles and Germans and often treated them alike. German civilians were also held as "reparation labor" by the USSR. Data from the Russian archives published in 2001, based on an actual enumeration, put the number of German civilians deported from Poland to the USSR in early 1945 for reparation labor at 155,262 where 37% (57,586) died. However, the West German Red Cross estimated in 1964 that 233,000 German civilians were deported to the USSR from Poland as forced laborers where 45% (105,000) were dead or missing. The West German Red Cross also estimated 110,000 German civilians were held as forced labor in Kaliningrad Oblast where 50,000 were dead or missing. The Soviets also deported from Poland 7,448 Poles of the Armia Krajowa, Soviet records indicated 506 of the Poles died in captivity. Tomasz Kamusella maintains that in early 1945, some 165,000 Germans were transported to the Soviet Union, where most perished. According to Gerhardt Reichling, 520,000 German civilians from the Oder-Neisse region were conscripted for forced labor by both the USSR and Poland, he maintains that 206,000 perished.

=== Internment and forced labor in Poland ===
Ethnic German citizens from pre-war Poland, who collaborated with the German occupiers, were considered "traitors of the nation" and sentenced to forced labor. In territories that belonged to Poland before the war, Germans were treated even more harshly than in the former German territories. Deprived of any citizen rights, many were used as forced labor prior to their expulsion, sometimes for years, in labor battalions or in labour camps. The major camps were at Glatz, Mielęcin, Gronów, Sikawa, Central Labour Camp Jaworzno, Central Labour Camp Potulice, Łambinowice (run by Czesław Gęborski), Zgoda labour camp and others. When Gęborski was tried by the Polish authorities in 1959 for his wanton brutality, he stated his only goal was to exact revenge for his own treatment during the war. The German Federal Archives estimated in 1974 that more than 200,000 German civilians were interned in Polish camps, they put the death rate at 20-50% and estimated that more than likely over 60,000 persons perished. The Polish historians Witold Sienkiewicz and Grzegorz Hryciuk maintain that the internment "resulted in numerous deaths, which cannot be accurately determined because of lack of statistics or falsification. Periodically, they could be 10% of inmates. Those interned are estimated at 200-250,000 Germans and the local population, and deaths might range from 15,000 to 60,000 persons." Norman Naimark cited Zygmunt Woźniczka as maintaining "that the death toll in all camps was between twenty and fifty percent of the inmates."

Zayas states that "in many internment camps no relief from outside was permitted. In some camps relatives would bring packages and deliver them to the Polish guards, who regularly plundered the contents and delivered only the remains, if any. Frequently, these relatives were so ill-treated that they never returned. Internees who came to claim their packages were also mistreated by the guards, who insisted the internees should speak Polish, even if they were Germans born in German-speaking Silesia or Pomerania."

Among the interned were also German POWs. Up to 10% of the 700,000 to 800,000 POWs of the respective battlegrounds were handed over to the Poles by the Soviet military for the use of their work force. POW labor was employed on the reconstruction of Warsaw and revival of industrial, agricultural and other productive enterprises Their number in 1946 was 40,000 according to the Polish administration, of whom 30,000 were used as miners in the Upper Silesian coal industries. 7,500 Germans accused of crimes against Poles were handed over to Poland by the Western Allies in 1946 and 1947. A number of German war criminals were imprisoned in Polish jails, at least 8,000 remained in jail in 1949, many of them also being POWs. (see also Supreme National Tribunal) Some Nazi criminals were executed (Category:Nazis executed in Poland), some died in prisons (Erich Koch in 1986), Johann Kremer was released in 1958 and returned to Germany.

=== Pre-Potsdam "wild" expulsions (May – July 1945) ===
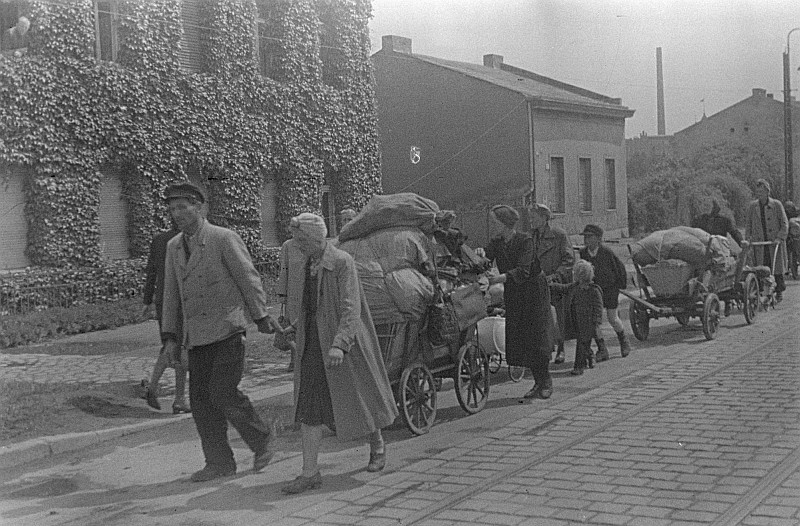
Refugees trail, eastern Germany 1945.

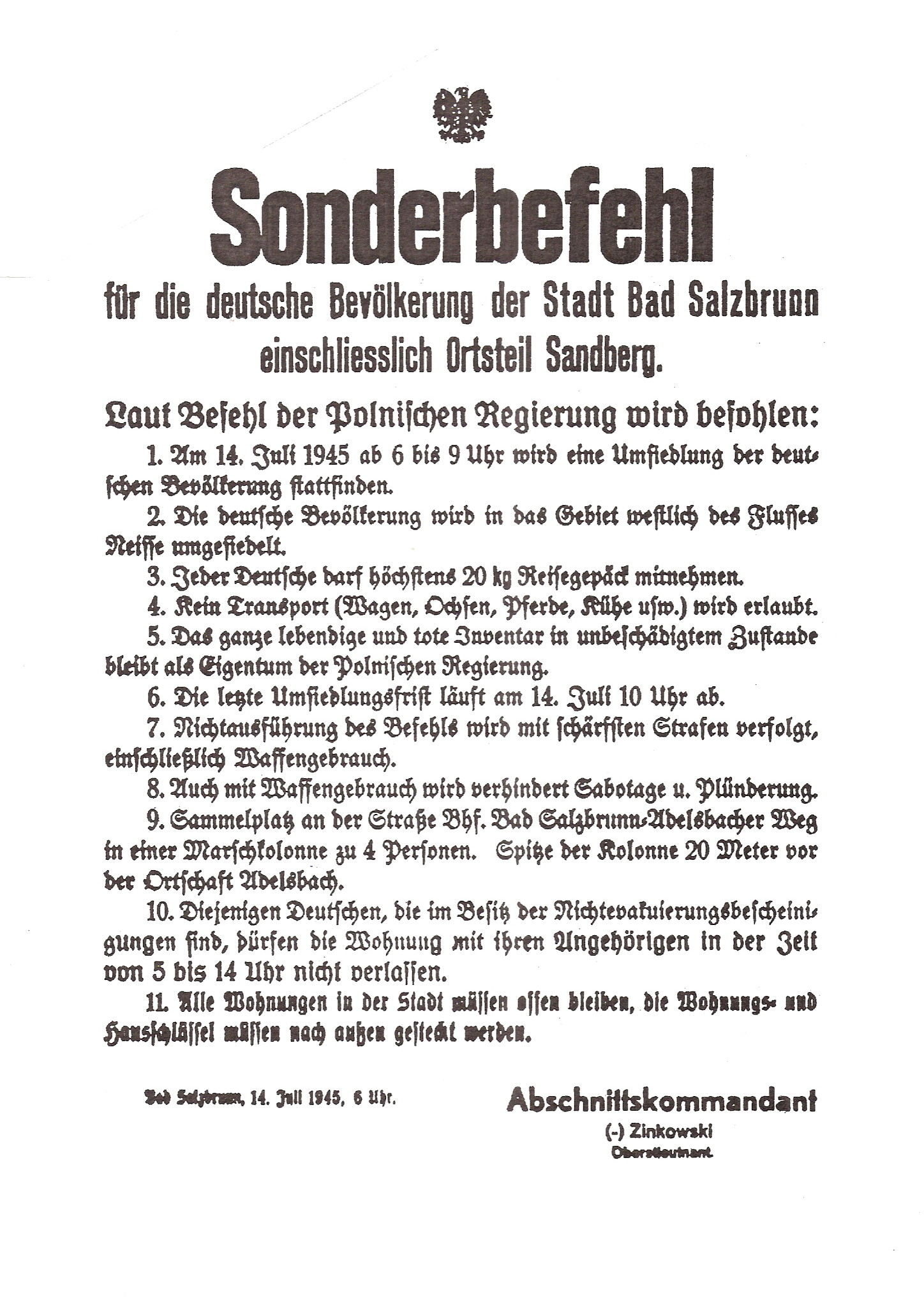
"Special order" to the German population of Bad Salzbrunn (Szczawno-Zdrój). Issued by Polish authorities on 14 July 1945, 6 a.m., to be executed until 10 a.m.

In 1945, the territories east of the Oder-Neisse line (Silesia, most of Pomerania, East Brandenburg and East Prussia) were occupied by Soviet and Soviet-controlled Polish military forces. Polish militia and military started expulsions before the Potsdam Conference, referred to as "wild expulsions" (German: Wilde Vertreibungen), affecting between 700,000 and 800,000 Germans. The Polish communists ordered the expulsion of Germans: "We must expel all the Germans because countries are built on national lines and not on multi-national ones" was demanded by participants of a Plenum of the Central Committee of the Polish Workers Party on May 20–21, 1945. On the same Plenum, the head of the Central Committee, Władysław Gomułka, ordered: "There has to be a border patrol at the border [Oder-Neisse line] and the Germans have to be driven out. The main objective has to be the cleansing of the terrain of Germans, the building of a nation state". To ensure the Oder–Neisse line would be accepted as the new Polish border at a future Allied Conference (Potsdam Conference), up to 300,000 Germans living close to the rivers' eastern bank were expelled subsequently. On May 26, 1945, the Central Committee ordered all Germans to be expelled within one year and the area settled with some 3.5 million ethnic Poles; 2.5 million of them were already re-settled by summer.

Germans were defined as either Reichsdeutsche or Volksdeutsche, resembling the 1st or 2nd category in the Nazis' Volksliste. People who had signed a lower category were allowed to apply for "verification", which was to determine whether they would be granted Polish citizenship as "autochthons".

Before June 1, 1945, some 400,000 Germans managed to cross the Oder and Neisse rivers eastward before Polish authorities closed the river crossings, another 800,000 entered Silesia from Czechoslovakia, bringing up Silesia's population to 50% of the pre-war level. This led to the odd situation of treks of Germans moving about in all directions, to the east as well as to the west, each warning the others of what would await them at their destination

== Expulsions following the Potsdam Conference ==
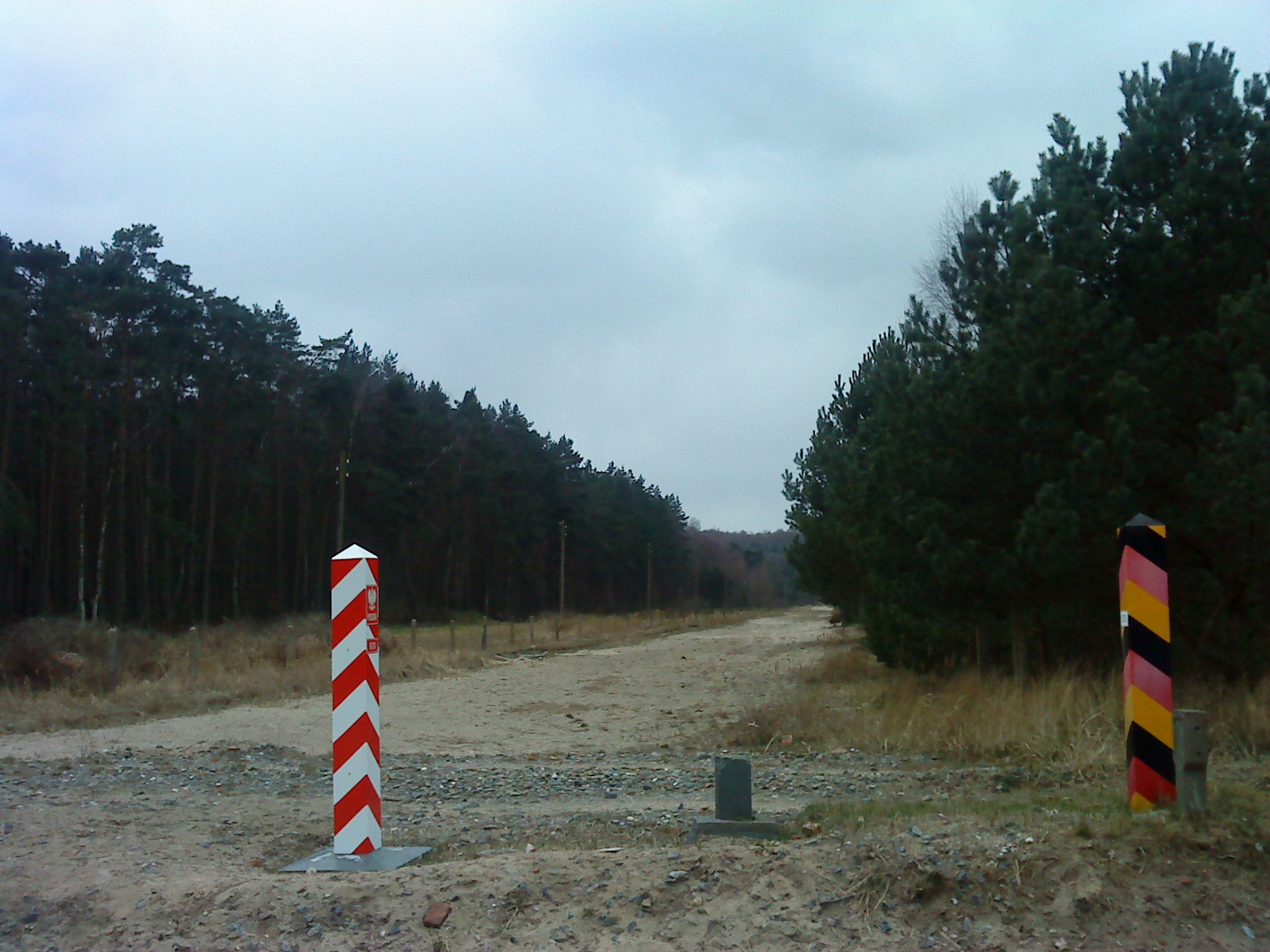
Oder-Neisse line at Usedom

After the Potsdam Conference, Poland was officially in charge of the territories east of the Oder–Neisse line. Despite the fact that article 12 of the Potsdam agreement from August 2, 1945, stated that "population transfer" should be performed in ordered and humane manner, and should not commence until after the creation of an expulsion plan approved by the Allied Control Council, the expulsions continued without rules and were associated with many criminal acts.

While the Polish administration had set up a State Repatriation Office (Państwowy Urząd Repatriacyjny, PUR), the bureau and its administrative subunits proved ineffective due to quarrels between Communists and opposition and a lack of equipment for the giant task of expelling Germans and resettling Poles in an area devastated by war. Furthermore, rivalry occurred between the Soviet occupation forces and the newly installed Polish administration, a phenomenon dubbed dwuwladza (double administration). The Soviets kept trains and German workmen regardless of the Polish ambitions and plans.

There was a simultaneous unorganized resettling of displaced and homeless Poles. Polish settlers, who themselves had been expelled from areas east of the Curzon Line, arrived with about nothing, putting an even higher pressure on the remaining Germans to leave. For the Germans, the Potsdam Agreement eased conditions only in one way - because now the Poles were more confident in keeping the former eastern territories of Germany, the expulsions were performed with less haste, which meant the Germans were duly informed about their expulsions earlier and were allowed to carry some luggage.

Another problem the Germans and, to a lesser extent, even the newly arrived Poles were facing was an enormous crime wave, most notably theft and rape, committed by gangs not only consisting of regular criminals but also Soviet soldiers, deserters or former forced laborers (Ost-Arbeiter), coming back from the west. In Upper Silesia, a party official, complained about some Polish security forces and militia raping and pillaging the German population and a general loss of sense for right and wrong. Much abuse also came from large Soviet contingents stationed in Poland after the war. A high number of crimes committed by regular Soviet soldiers - on both Germans and Poles - had been reported (see Rape during the liberation of Poland). A high death toll among the few Polish officials who dared to investigate these cases followed. Yet, Soviet troops played an ambiguous role, as there are also cases where Soviets freed local Germans imprisoned by Poles, or delayed expulsions to keep German workforce, for example on farms providing Soviet troops (for instance in Słupsk).

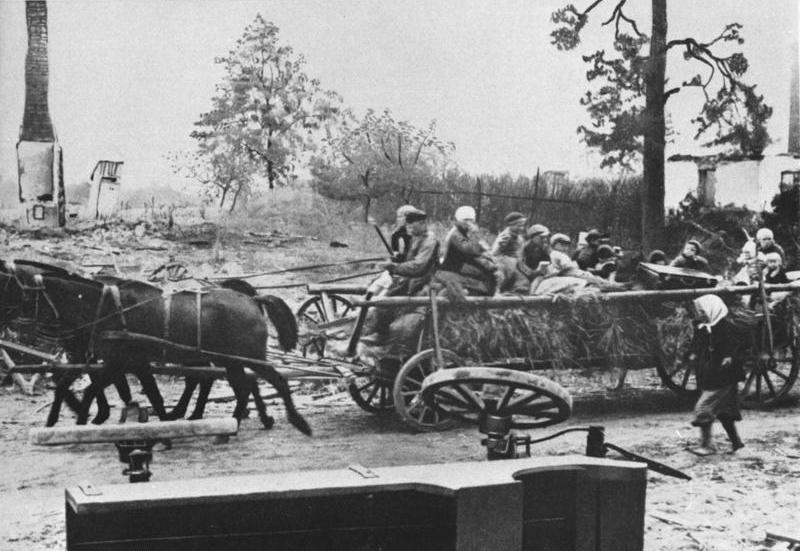
Refugees from East Prussia, 1945

The damaged infrastructure and quarrels between the Allied authorities in the occupation zones of Germany and the Polish administration caused long delays in the transport of expellees, who were first ordered to gather at one of the various PUR transportation centers or internment camps and then often forced to wait in ill-equipped barracks, exposed both to criminals, aggressive guards and the cold and not supplied sufficiently with food due to the overall shortages. The "organized transfer" as agreed at the Potsdam Conference began in early 1946. Conditions for expellees improved, yet due to the lack of heating facilities, the cold winters of both 1945/46 and 1946/47 continued to claim many lives. On September 13, 1946 President Bierut signed a decree on "the exclusion of persons of German nationality from the Polish National Community" The major evictions were completed in 1946, although another 500,000 Germans arrived in the Soviet Zone from Poland in 1947. An unknown number remained; a small German minority continues to reside in Upper Silesia and Masuria.

== Execution of deportation ==
The regions were typically evacuated of its population village by village. On short notice, Germans were ordered to assemble in the local market square to march on to a relocation camp (obozy tranzytowe), allowed to take with them as much as they could carry. Deportation of Germans was by trains to the west that in reverse direction brought Polish displaced persons such as former forced laborers. Trains were sealed to prevent flight of the deported and often took days or even weeks, during which many of the old and young people died. The condition of the deported as they arrived in the British occupation zone impelled the British to raise a formal protest on April 11, 1946.

== "Autochthons" ==
Close to three million residents of Upper Silesia (Silesians), Masuria (Masurs) and Pomerania (Slovincians, Kashubians) were considered of Slavic descent but many of them did not identify with Polish nationality, were either bilingual or spoke German only. The Polish government declared these so-called "Autochthons" to be Germanized Poles, who would be re-Polonized and serve as a proof of a continual Polish settlement. The Polish government aimed to retain as many "autochthons" as possible, as they were needed both for economic reasons and also for propaganda purposes, as their presence on former German soil was used to indicate an intrinsic "Polishness" character of the area and justify its incorporation into the Polish state as "Recovered Territories". "Verification" and "national rehabilitation" processes were set up to reveal a "dormant Polishness" and to determine which were redeemable as Polish citizens; few were actually expelled.

The verification procedure varied in different territories and was changed several times. Initially, the applicants had to prove their past membership in a Polish minority organization of the German Reich, and in addition needed a warrant where three Polish locals testified their Polishness. In April 1945, the Upper Silesian voivode declared the fulfillment of only one of these requirements to be sufficient. In Masuria, a Polish last name or a Polish-speaking ancestor was sufficient. On the other hand, in areas like Lower Silesia and the province of Pomerania, verification was handled much more strictly. Of the 1,104,134 "verified autochthons" in the census of 1950, close to 900,000 were natives of Upper Silesia and Masuria.

To the west of Cassubia in the area of Slovincian settlement, some residents were expelled along with the German population, but some remained. In the 1950s, mainly in the village of Kluki (formerly Klucken), a few elderly people still remembered fragments of Slovincian.

Some non-German residents of the Recovered Territories and the Kaliningrad Oblast who were not of Slavic descent, such as the Lietuvininkai and Kursenieki were also expelled to Germany after the war. A similar fate occurred to the Czech speaking residents of the Czech Corner in Kladsko Land who were transferred to Czechoslovakia.

The word "autochthon", introduced by the Polish government in 1945 for propaganda purposes, is today sometimes considered an offensive remark and direct naming as Kashubians, Silesians, Slovincians, and Masurians is preferred to avoid offending the people described.

=== Origin of the post-war population according to 1950 census ===
During the Polish post-war census of December 1950, data about the pre-war places of residence of the inhabitants as of August 1939 was collected. In case of children born between September 1939 and December 1950, their place of residence was reported based on the pre-war places of residence of their mothers. Thanks to this data it is possible to reconstruct the pre-war geographical origin of the post-war population. Many areas located near the pre-war German border were resettled by people from neighbouring borderland areas of pre-war Poland. For example, Kashubians from the pre-war Polish Corridor settled in nearby areas of German Pomerania adjacent to Polish Pomerania. People from the Poznań region of pre-war Poland settled in East Brandenburg. People from East Upper Silesia moved into the rest of Silesia. And people from Masovia and from Sudovia moved into adjacent Masuria. Poles expelled from former Polish territories in the east (today mainly parts of Ukraine, Belarus and Lithuania) settled in large numbers everywhere in the Recovered Territories (but many of them also settled in central Poland).

Origin of settlers and the number of autochthons in the Recovered Territories in 1950 (county data grouped based on pre-1939 administrative borders)
| Region (within 1939 borders): | West Upper Silesia | Lower Silesia | East Brandenburg | West Pomerania | Free City Danzig | South East Prussia | Total |
|---|---|---|---|---|---|---|---|
| Autochthons (1939 DE/FCD citizens) | 789,716 | 120,885 | 14,809 | 70,209 | 35,311 | 134,702 | 1,165,632 |
| Polish expellees from Kresy (USSR) | 232,785 | 696,739 | 187,298 | 250,091 | 55,599 | 172,480 | 1,594,992 |
| Poles from abroad except the USSR | 24,772 | 91,395 | 10,943 | 18,607 | 2,213 | 5,734 | 153,664 |
| Resettlers from the City of Warsaw | 11,333 | 61,862 | 8,600 | 37,285 | 19,322 | 22,418 | 160,820 |
| From Warsaw region (Masovia) | 7,019 | 69,120 | 16,926 | 73,936 | 22,574 | 158,953 | 348,528 |
| From Białystok region and Sudovia | 2,229 | 23,515 | 3,772 | 16,081 | 7,638 | 102,634 | 155,869 |
| From pre-war Polish Pomerania | 5,444 | 54,564 | 19,191 | 145,854 | 72,847 | 83,921 | 381,821 |
| Resettlers from Poznań region | 8,936 | 172,163 | 88,427 | 81,215 | 10,371 | 7,371 | 368,483 |
| Katowice region (East Upper Silesia) | 91,011 | 66,362 | 4,725 | 11,869 | 2,982 | 2,536 | 179,485 |
| Resettlers from the City of Łódź | 1,250 | 16,483 | 2,377 | 8,344 | 2,850 | 1,666 | 32,970 |
| Resettlers from Łódź region | 13,046 | 96,185 | 22,954 | 76,128 | 7,465 | 6,919 | 222,697 |
| Resettlers from Kielce region | 16,707 | 141,748 | 14,203 | 78,340 | 16,252 | 20,878 | 288,128 |
| Resettlers from Lublin region | 7,600 | 70,622 | 19,250 | 81,167 | 19,002 | 60,313 | 257,954 |
| Resettlers from Kraków region | 60,987 | 156,920 | 12,587 | 18,237 | 5,278 | 5,515 | 259,524 |
| Resettlers from Rzeszów region | 23,577 | 110,188 | 13,147 | 57,965 | 6,200 | 47,626 | 258,703 |
| place of residence in 1939 unknown | 36,834 | 26,586 | 5,720 | 17,891 | 6,559 | 13,629 | 107,219 |
| Total pop. in December 1950 | 1,333,246 | 1,975,337 | 444,929 | 1,043,219 | 292,463 | 847,295 | 5,936,489 |

== Rehabilitation of Volksdeutsche ==
During the war the population of the annexed areas of Poland was classified by the Nazis in different categories according to their "Germanness" in the Deutsche Volksliste. While most of the Volksdeutsche population of pre-war Poland fled or was expelled, some were rehabilitated and offered their pre-war Polish citizenship back. While those who had signed Volksliste category "I" were expelled, rehabilitation was offered to people who had been subject to forced labour before, spoke Polish and were rated as not constituting a threat. Once granted Polish citizenship, they were encouraged to Polonize their names, or to restore their original Polish names if they had been Germanized during the war. Numbers of how many were offered to stay in Poland as Poles and eventually did are not available, but it is assumed that the vast majority had rather opted and left for Germany by 1960. Those of mixed descent from within or without the borders of pre-war Poland were also allowed to stay on the premise of Polonization, yet likewise no comprehensive data exist.

== Exempted Germans ==
Some Germans were exempted from expulsion and retained because of their professional skills, if no Pole was at hand to replace them. These Germans were treated as second class citizens, especially regarding salary and food supply. So-called "abandoned wives", whose husbands found themselves in post-war Germany and were not able to return, were compelled to "seek divorce" and were not allowed to leave for Germany before 1950–52. The other ones retained were not allowed to leave before 1956; these measures also included the families of the retained or the parts thereof remaining with them. About 250,000 had been issued East German passports in the 1950s, ending their former statelessness. Many were concentrated in the areas of Wrocław (former Breslau) Wałbrzych (former Waldenburg), and Legnica (former Liegnitz), all in Lower Silesia, and in Koszalin (former Köslin) in Pomerania. How many actually left is uncertain, though it is generally assumed that the majority emigrated. The German society of Wałbrzych has maintained a continuous existence since 1957.

== Repopulation ==
People from all over Poland moved in to replace the former German population in a process parallel to the expulsions. While the Germans were interned and expelled, up to 5 million settlers were either attracted or forced to settle the area. The settlers can be grouped according to their background:

- Settlers from Central Poland moving in on a voluntary basis (majority)
- Former slave workers of Nazi Germany: 2.8 million Poles that had been freed from forced labor in Nazi Germany (up to two millions)
- Repatriants – Poles expelled from the Kresy areas east of the Curzon Line annexed by the Soviet Union, who made up for less than 10% of the overall Polish population, were preferably settled in the new western territories where they made up for 26% of the population (up to two million) Most of the Poles from ex-Polish today's Belarus were sent to the northern ex-German regions east of the Oder and in the vicinity of the Baltic Sea, whereas the majority of Poles from today's Ukraine were directed to find settlement around the Opole Province and Lower Silesia. This migratory movement of Polish "Repatriants" was depicted in a Boża podszewka II TV series.
- Poles coming from Western and Southern Europe, e.g. French miners and farmers from Prnjavor, Bosnia and Herzegovina region
- Non-Poles forcefully resettled during Operation Vistula in 1947. Large numbers of Ukrainians were forced to move from south eastern Poland under a 1947 Polish government operation, termed Operation Vistula, which aimed at breaking up, and therefore assimilating, the Ukrainian population, which had not been expelled eastward already, throughout the newly acquired territories. Belarusians living around the area around Białystok were also pressured into relocating to the areas vacated by fleeing German population for the same reasons. This scattering of members of non-Polish ethnic groups throughout the country was an attempt by the Polish authorities to dissolve the unique ethnic identity of groups like the Ukrainians, Belarusians and Lemkos, and broke the proximity and communication necessary for strong communities to form.
- Tens of thousands of Jewish Holocaust-survivors, most of them being "repatriates" from the East, settled mostly in Lower Silesia creating Jewish cooperatives and institutions — the largest communities were founded in Wrocław, Szczecin, Dzierżoniów and Wałbrzych. However, most of them later left Poland.
- 10,000–15,000 Greeks and Slavomacedonians — Refugees of the Greek Civil War

== Formal end of the expulsions ==
After 1 January 1948, Germans were primarily shipped to the Soviet occupation zone (after 7 October 1949, the German Democratic Republic (GDR)), based on a Polish-Soviet agreement. Most Germans had been expelled by the end of 1947. In entire 1948, a relatively small number of 42,700 were expelled, and another 34,100 in 1949. In 1950, 59,433 Germans were expelled following a bi-lateral agreement between the People's Republic of Poland and the GDR, 26,196 of whom however headed for West Germany. Between October 1948 and December 1950 all 35,000 German prisoners of war detained in Poland were shipped to Germany.

On 10 March 1951, the Polish "Bureau for Repatriation" (PUR) was disbanded; all further resettlement from Poland to Germany was carried out in a non-forcible and peaceful manner by the Polish state travel agency Orbis.

== Demographic estimates ==
According to the Polish census of 1946, there were still 2,036,400 Germans in the "Recovered Territories", 251,900 in the pre-war Polish territories (primarily eastern Upper Silesia, Pomerelia and Greater Poland) and the former Free City of Danzig, and 417,000 in the process of "verification" as "new" Poles. The census data did not include former German citizens already "verified" as ethnic Poles, Germans in forced labor or detention camps and otherwise detained Germans, and Germans employed by the Soviet administration.

According to S. Banasiak, 3,109,900 Germans were expelled to the Soviet and British occupation zones in Germany and thereby registered by Polish officials between 1945 and 1950. Registration by Polish officials was not exhaustive, especially in 1945. An unknown number left without formal registration or was expelled by Soviet military authorities without notifying by Polish officials responsible for statistics. Also, especially in 1945, many Germans returned to their former homes and some were expelled more than once.

Tomasz Kamusella cites estimates of 7 million expelled during both "wild" and "legal" expulsions from the Recovered Territories (Deutsche Ostgebiete) until 1948. The number is based on the 1946 census in which citizens were asked specifically if they were Polish or German. The expelled included German autochthons stripped of Polish citizenship and an additional 700,000 members of the German minority from areas of pre-war Poland. Kamusella states that in 1944-1945, about 5 million had fled from the former eastern territories of Germany, and 500,000 from the Polish lands incorporated into the Third Reich, whereas in 1946-1948, 3.325 million were expelled from the former German territories, (as well as 3 million from Czechoslovakia, and 250,000 from Hungary), emphasizing these numbers are not exhaustive.

Overy cites approximate totals of those evacuated, migrated, or expelled between 1944 and 1950 from East Prussia: 1.4 million to Western Germany, 609,000 to Eastern Germany; from West Prussia: 230,000 to Western Germany, 61,000 to Eastern Germany; from the former German area East of the Oder-Neisse: 3.2 million to Western Germany, 2 million to Eastern Germany.

According to Kacowicz, about 3.5 million people had fled before the organized expulsions began, mainly driven by fear of the advancing Soviet Army, between seven hundred and eight hundred thousand Germans were affected by the "wild" expulsions, and another three millions were expelled in 1946 and 1947.

== Legacy ==
=== Post-war ===
In Communist Poland, the expulsions were not to be questioned, and ideologically defended by propaganda. The expulsions were perceived by many Poles as just with respect to the former German Nazi policies, injustices were balanced off with the injustices during the contemporary "repatriation" of Poles. Except for the use in official anti-German propaganda, the expulsions became a taboo in Polish politics, public, and education for decades. German expellee organizations who did not accept the post-war territorial and population changes fueled Communist propaganda dismissing them as "far-right revanchists".

In the first years after the war, the bishop of Katowice, Stanisław Adamski, criticized the expulsion of Germans as inhumane.

According to Philipp Ther, pre-1989 Polish historiography has in general either underestimated or concealed the role of force during the expulsions. Ther says that this was caused on the one hand by censorship, and on the other hand by the interpretation of the registration forms the expellees had signed as acquiescence to "voluntary emigration".

=== Post-communist (1989–present) ===
The Polish role in the expulsions could not be contemplated in Poland until the end of the Cold War.

In the Polish–German border and neighborhood treaties of 1990 and 1991, the term "expulsion" for the first time replaced the old and euphemistic Communist term "resettlement" or the Potsdam term "population transfer", which were used by Polish officials before. Though "Wypędzenie", the Polish term for "expulsion", is since widely used officially, in regular linguistic practice it is still an emotionally loaded term, not as it were, something that is being acknowledged, and closely attached to the question of "right" or "wrong". Polish and joint German-Polish scholarly research and public debates in Poland were now concerned with issues like moral examination of the expulsions, responsibility for the inflicted suffering, terminology, numbers, and whether the expellee's status was that of a political subject or object.

In 1995, Polish foreign minister Władysław Bartoszewski expressed regret for innocent German suffering before the German parliament and federative council. In 1996, the Polish public opinion research institute CBOS polled public opinion about a phrase in the letter of reconciliation the Polish bishops had written in 1965: "We forgive and ask for forgiveness": 28% agreed; 45% agreed with the offering of forgiveness, but rejected the part that asked for forgiveness; 22% disagreed altogether.

A 1993 novel Summer of Dead Dreams written by Harry Thürk – a German author who left Upper Silesia annexed by Poland shortly after the war had ended – contained graphic depictions of the treatment of Germans by Soviets and Poles in Thürk's hometown of Prudnik. It depicted the maltreatment of Germans while also acknowledging German guilt, as well as Polish animosity toward Germans and, in specific instances, friendships between Poles and Germans despite the circumstances. Thürk's novel, when serialized in Polish translation by the Tygodnik Prudnicki ("Prudnik Weekly") magazine, was met with criticism from some Polish residents of Prudnik, but also with praise, because it revealed to many local citizens that there had been a post-war German ghetto in the town and addressed the tensions between Poles and Soviets in post-war Poland. The serialization was followed by an exhibition on Thürk's life in Prudnik's town museum.

The Polish government made some efforts to sue Germany for damages inflicted on Poland during World War II in return. The advancing German project of erecting a Centre Against Expulsions depicting the fate of 20th-century European expellees (mostly, but not only, German) is controversial in Poland, and was described by former Polish Prime Minister Jarosław Kaczyński as "equating the victims with the persecutors".

== See also ==
- German minority in Poland
- Polish population transfers (1944–46)
- World War II evacuation and expulsion
- Territorial evolution of Germany
- Territorial evolution of Poland

== Sources ==
- Baziur, Grzegorz (2003). "Armia Czerwona na Pomorzu Gdańskim 1945-1947" (Red Army in Gdańsk Pomerania 1945-1947). Warszawa: Instytut Pamięci Narodowej. ISBN 83-89078-19-8.
- Douglas, R.M.: Orderly and Humane. The Expulsion of the Germans after the Second World War. Yale University Press, 2012. ISBN 978-0-300-16660-6.
- Esch, Michael G.; Sundhaussen, Holm (2006), "Geschichte: Forschung und Wissenschaft" (Google books preview), in Brunnbauer, Ulf (ed.), Definitionsmacht, Utopie, Vergeltung: "Ethnische Säuberungen" im östlichen Europa des 20. Jahrhunderts (in German), LIT Verlag Münster, p. 301, ISBN 3-8258-8033-8
- Gormly, James L. From Potsdam to the Cold War. Big Three Diplomacy 1945-1947. Scholarly Resources, Delaware, 1990 (ISBN 0-8420-2334-8)
- Jankowiak, Stanisław (2005). "Wysiedlenie i emigracja ludności niemieckiej w polityce władz polskich w latach 1945-1970" (Expulsion and emigration of German population in the policies of Polish authorities in 1945-1970). Warszawa: Instytut Pamięci Narodowej. ISBN 83-89078-80-5.
- Kamusella, Tomasz (2004), "The Expulsion of the Population Categorized as 'Germans' from the Post-1945 Poland" (PDF direct download, 2.52 MB), Steffen Prauser and Arfon Rees (ed.), The Expulsion of the 'German' Communities from Eastern Europe at the End of the Second World War, European University Institute, Florence. Department of History and Civilization, pp. 21–30, EUI Working Paper HEC No. 2004/1
- Naimark, Norman m.: Fires of Hatred. Ethnic Cleansing in Twentieth - Century Europe. Cambridge, Harvard University Press, 2001.
- Naimark, Norman M. The Russians in Germany: A History of the Soviet Zone of Occupation, 1945-1949. Harvard University Press, 1995. ISBN 0-674-78405-7
- Nitschke, Bernadetta (2003). Vertreibung und Aussiedlung der deutschen Bevölkerung aus Polen 1945 bis 1949. Munich: Oldenbourg.
- Podlasek, Maria (1995). Wypędzenie Niemców z terenów na wschód od Odry i Nysy Łużyckiej (in Polish). Warszawa: Wydawnictwo Polsko - Niemieckie. ISBN 83-86653-00-0.
- Ther, Philipp (1998). Deutsche und polnische Vertriebene: Gesellschaft und Vertriebenenpolitik in SBZ/DDR und in Polen 1945-1956 (in German). Vandenhoeck & Ruprecht. ISBN 3-525-35790-7.
- Thum, Gregor (2003). Die fremde Stadt. Breslau 1945. Berlin: Siedler. ISBN 3-88680-795-9.
- „Unsere Heimat ist uns ein fremdes Land geworden..." Die Deutschen östlich von Oder und Neiße 1945-1950. Dokumente aus polnischen Archiven. Band 1: Zentrale Behörden, Wojewodschaft Allenstein
- Urban, Thomas (2004). Der Verlust. Die Vertreibung der Deutschen und Polen im 20. Jahrhundert (in German). München: C. H. Beck Verlag. ISBN 3-406-52172-X.
- de Zayas, Alfred-Maurice. Nemesis at Potsdam: The Expulsion of the Germans from the East. London: Routledge,1977. ISBN 0-8032-4910-1
- Alfred M. de Zayas: Die deutschen Vertriebenen. Keine Täter sondern Opfer. Ares, Graz, 2006. ISBN 3-902475-15-3.
- Alfred M. de Zayas: Heimatrecht ist Menschenrecht. Universitas, München, 2001. ISBN 3-8004-1416-3.
- de Zayas, Alfred-Maurice. A Terrible Revenge: The Ethnic Cleansing of the East European Germans. New York: St. Martin's Press, 1994, ISBN 1-4039-7308-3
- Zybura, Marek (2004). "Niemcy w Polsce" (Germans in Poland). Wrocław: Wydawnictwo Dolnośląskie. ISBN 83-7384-171-7.
