= Brzeg Synagogue =

Former synagogue, now residence, in Brzeg, Poland

- Polish: Synagoga w Brzegu
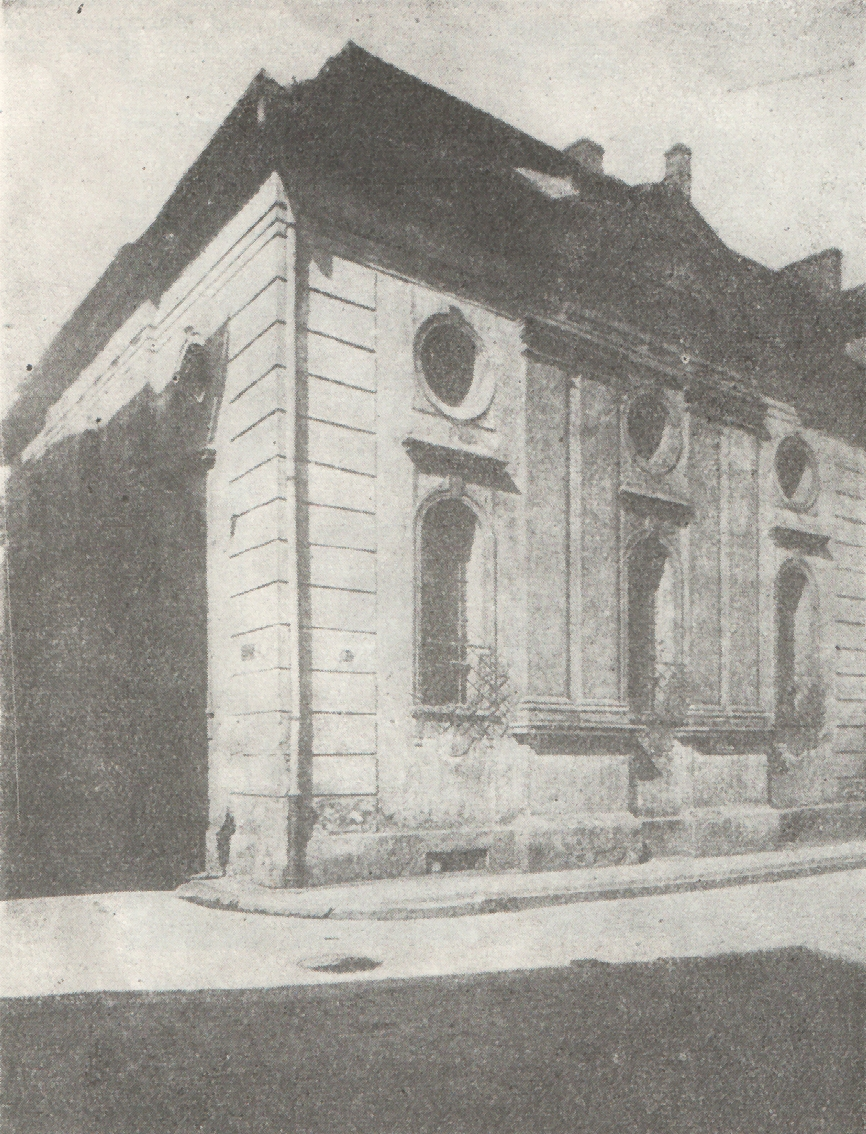
- The former synagogue, c. 1935

- Location of the destroyed synagogue, now residence, in Opole Voivodeship

Religion
- Affiliation: Judaism (former)
- Rite: Nusach Ashkenaz
- Ecclesiastical or organizational status: Synagogue (1799–1938); Residence (since 1940)
- Status: Destroyed (as a synagogue); Rebuilt (as a residence)

Location
- Location: 61 Długa Street, Brzeg, Opole Voivodeship
- Country: Poland
- Interactive map of Brzeg Synagogue
- Coordinates: 50°51′40″N 17°28′01″E

Architecture
- Type: Synagogue architecture
- Completed: 1799
- Destroyed: November 10, 1938 (interior only; during Kristallnacht)
- Materials: Brick

The Brzeg Synagogue is a former Jewish synagogue building, located at 61 Długa Street, in Brzeg, in the Opole Voivodeship of Poland. Completed in 1799 and partially destroyed by the Nazis during Kristallnacht, the building was rebuilt in 1940 as a residence.

== History ==
At the beginning of the sixteenth century a former synagogue building stood in the location of the present, but burnt down in 1507. The synagogue was built by Jews from Biała, who settled in Brzeg in 1660. The first rabbi was recruited by the gmina in 1816. A major renovation of the building occurred in 1899, and again in 1937. During the Kristallnacht through November 9 to 10, 1938, the Nazis destroyed the interior of the synagogue and publicly burnt the Torah.

In 1940, the former synagogue was reconstructed to serve as a residence.

== Gallery ==
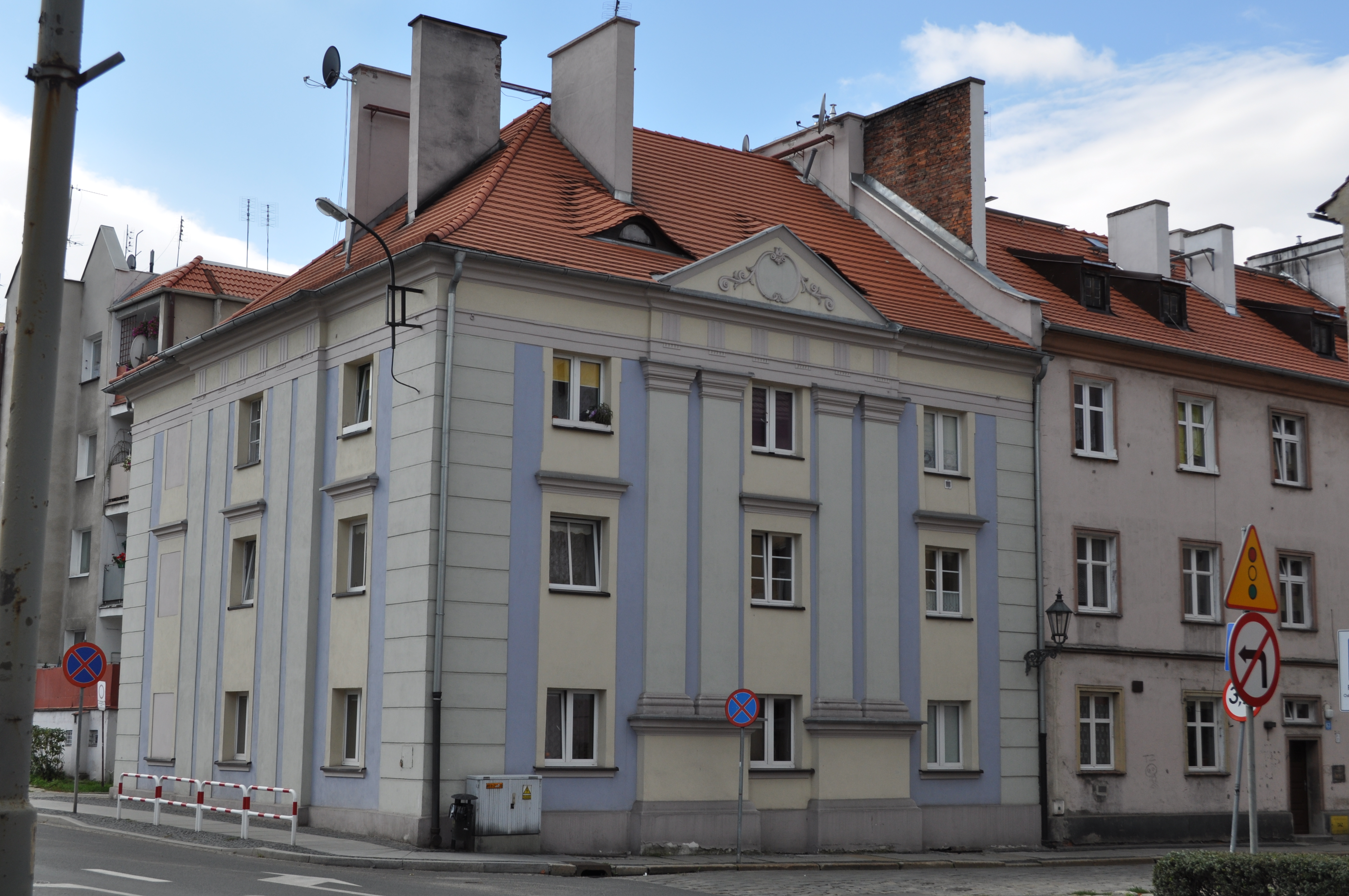
The former synagogue, rebuilt as a residence

== See also ==
- History of the Jews in Poland
- List of active synagogues in Poland
