= Rashap =

Rashap may refer to:

- Resheph, god associated with war and plague
- Solomon Pappenheim (1740 – 1814), German rabbi, linguist, and poet
