= Biała, Opole Voivodeship =

Biała Zülz
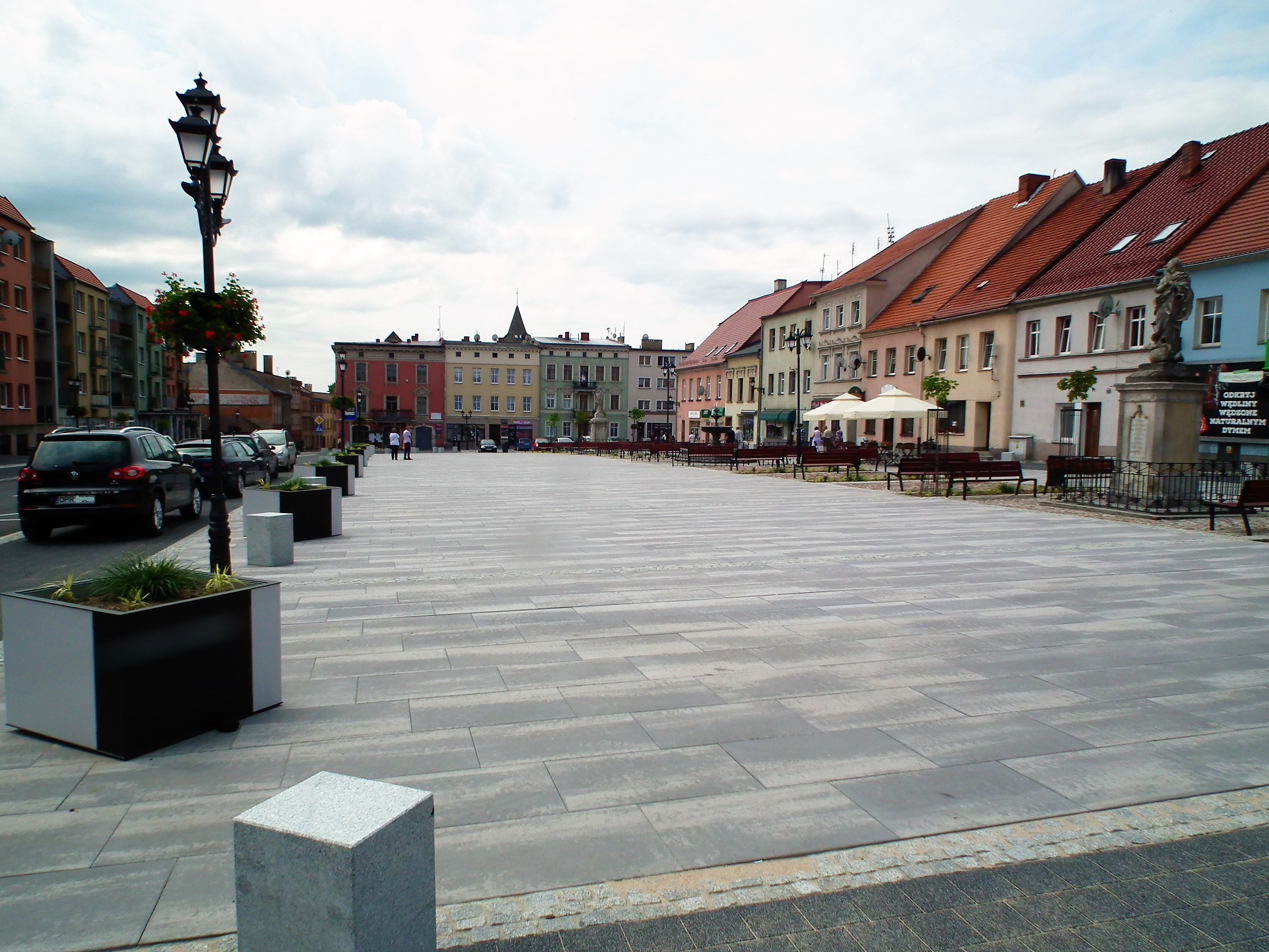
- Market square

- Flag Coat of arms

- Location within Poland
- Coordinates: 50°24′N 17°40′E
- Country: Poland
- Voivodeship: Opole
- County: Prudnik
- Gmina: Biała
- First mentioned: 1225
- Town rights: 1311

Government
  - Mayor: Edward Plicko

Area
  - Total: 14.72 km^{2} (5.68 sq mi)

Population (31 December 2021)
  - Total: 2,336
  - Density: 159/km^{2} (410/sq mi)
- Time zone: UTC+1 (CET)
  - Summer (DST): UTC+2 (CEST)
- Postal code: 48-210
- Area code: +48 77
- Car plates: OPR
- Website: biala.gmina.pl

Biała, informally Biała Prudnicka [ˈbʲawa prudˈɲit͡ska] (German: Zülz, Zültz, as well as older Zel(c)z, Zeltz, Silesian: Biołŏ, Biołŏ Prudnickŏ), is a town in southern Poland, located in the southern part of Opole Voivodeship in Prudnik County near the border with the Czech Republic. It is the administrative seat of Gmina Biała. As of December 2021, it has a population of 2,336.

The town was founded in the 12th–13th century. Over the centuries, Biała was located within Poland, Austria, Prussia, Germany, and eventually again Poland. A significant German minority resides in the vicinity. The town also possesses numerous architectural monuments and historic buildings.

== Etymology ==
The name "Biała" was created after Polish word biały (white).

== Geography ==
Biała is located in the historic Silesia (Upper Silesia) region at the confluence of the Biała river. The city is situated on the Biała Uplands (Polish: Wysoczyzna Bialska; a part of the Silesian Lowlands).

== History ==
=== Middle Ages ===
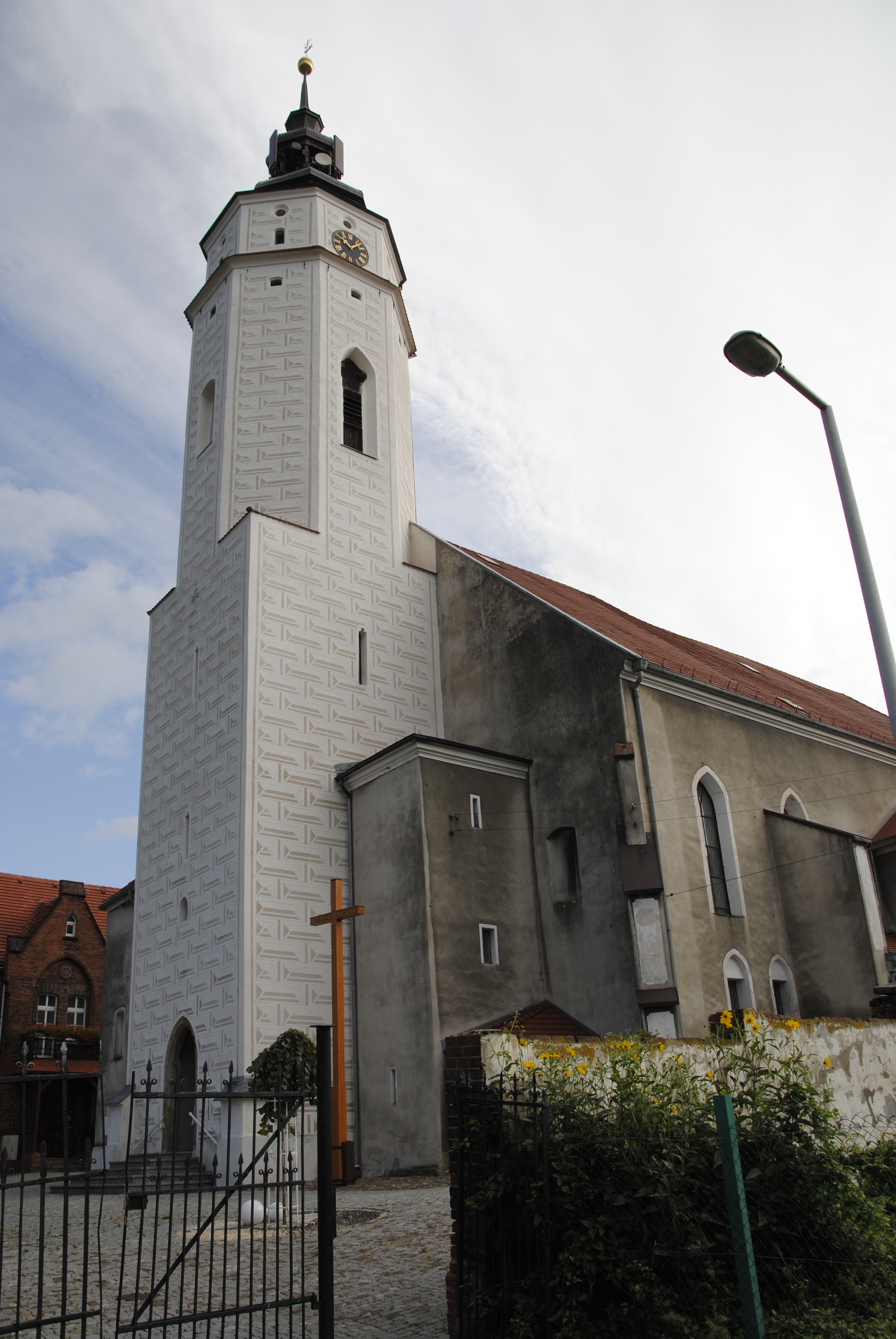
Gothic Church of the Assumption

The region became part of the emerging Polish state under its first historic ruler Mieszko I of Poland in 990. A Polish stronghold existed in present-day Biała, and in the 12th-13th century it was already a seat of local castellans. Biała was located on a trade route connecting Kraków and Nysa, and various crafts developed. As a result of the fragmentation of Poland, it was part of the duchies of Silesia, Opole, Niemodlin and Oleśnica, and remained ruled by local Polish dukes of the Piast dynasty until 1532, although in 1327 it fell under the suzerainty of Bohemia. In the southwestern corner of their domain, the dukes of Opole built a castle, named Biała (in medieval documents mentioned under the Latinized name Bela), on the Biała river. This castle was the seat of power of a local mayor of the palace. Around the foot of the castle, a village, settled by new colonists, including Germans, the seat of its local parish, served as a setting-off point for further settlement in the region, which was densely forested and bordered Moravia. The village was first mentioned historically in 1225.

In 1270 Biała, was a county seat, and it was granted town rights in 1311, later modeled on Środa Śląska and Wrocław. Around the year 1270, a new settlement, named Zolez and later Zülz, was founded between castle and the small surrounding village. Its construction was highly traditional. The town was walled after its completion, with two gates being constructed to allow access. A marketplace was built in the center of the town as well. Around this time, several surrounding municipalities changed their names. Biała, named for the castle, became the Old Town, while the new settlement, 4 km (2 mi) to the east, was already named Zülz, by the colonists, and was renamed Alt Zülz (English: Old Zülz). The church at Alt Zülz, which had been the main church in the area, was made a satellite church of a new, larger city church, built in 1400 by local Polish dukes. Zülz became the seat of a vogt in 1311. In 1428 it was plundered by the Hussites. In 1502 and 1503 Duke Jan II the Good granted various new privileges to the town.

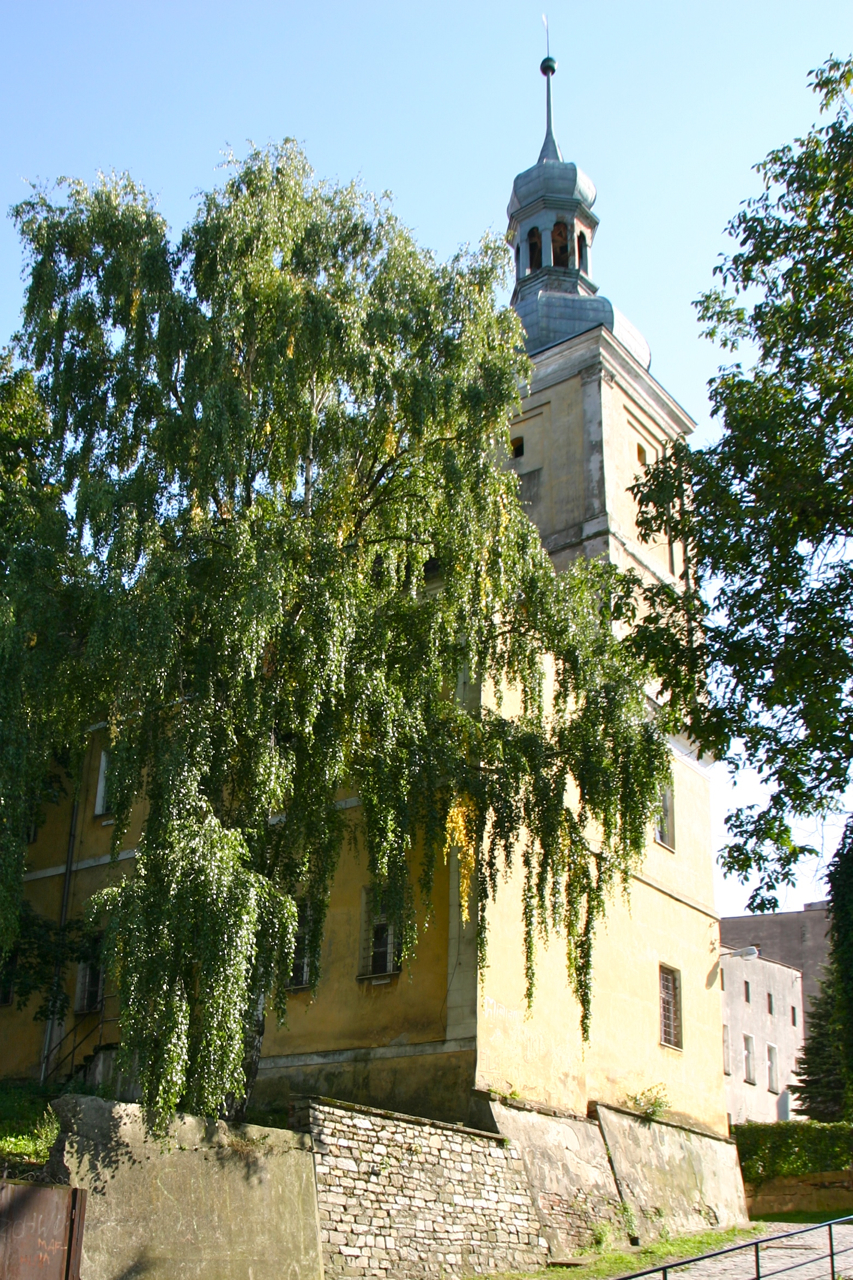
Renaissance castle

In 1335, the town became a Presbyterium, a local seat of power of the Roman Catholic Church. However, this was not permanent. After the death of the last duke of Opole, Jan II the Good in 1532, the town was incorporated to the Habsburg-ruled Kingdom of Bohemia and the Habsburgs soon mortgaged the town's ecclesiastical position to pay off debts. Also by the end of the 14th century, the city had acquired a large Jewish population. Over the next 200 years, the town passed into the possession of various groups, including the barons of Prószków. This was significant, as under the rule of the barons, Zülz was only one of two Silesian cities, the other being Głogów, which did not expel their Jewish populations. Under a 1601 petition of the barons, Bohemian King Rudolf II extended special protective privileges to the Jewish population of Zülz.

=== Modern era ===
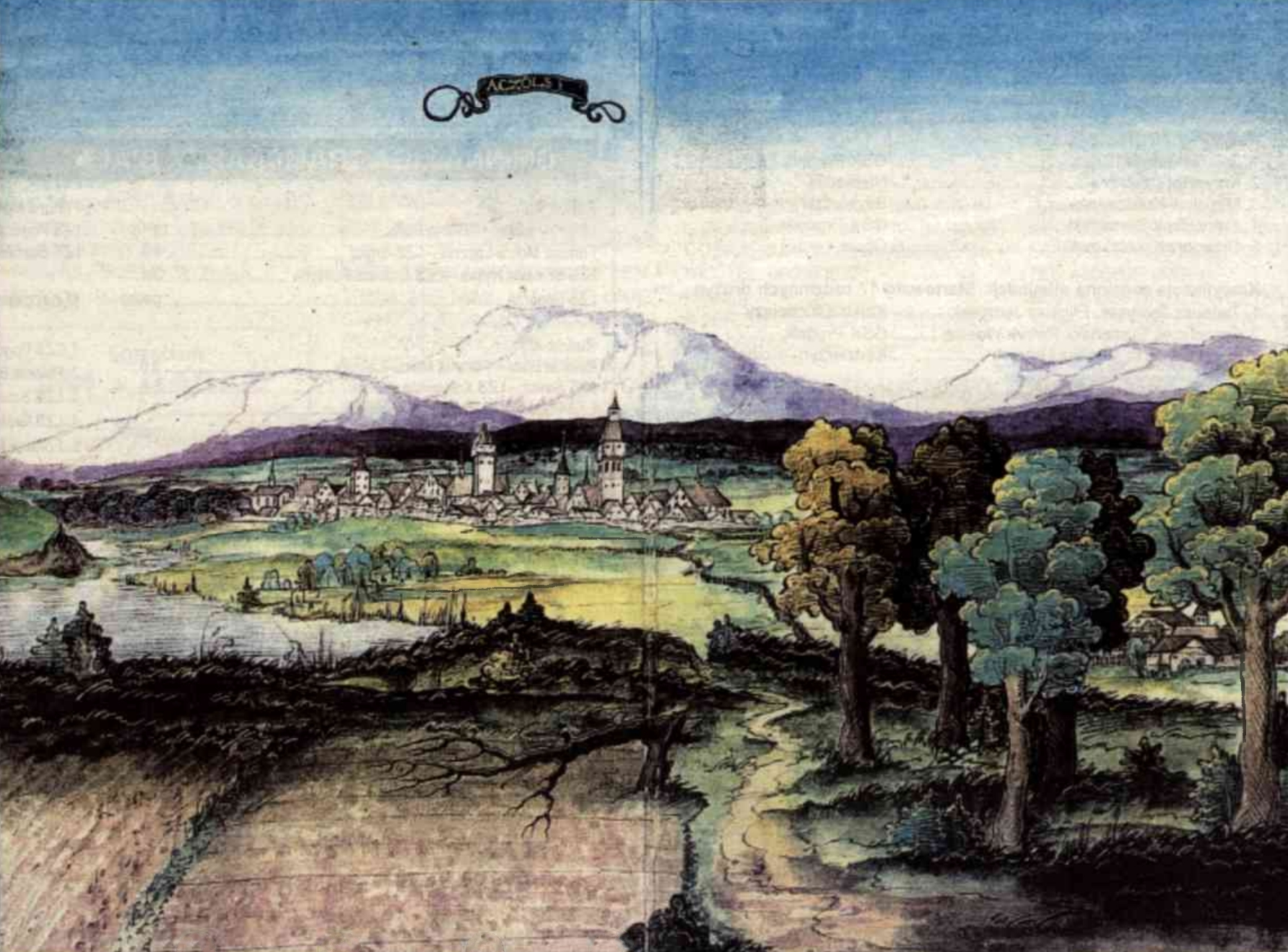
16th-century panorama of the town

The town was doubly devastated in the 1630s, as both the Thirty Years' War and the Black Death killed nearly the entire population of the town. To mark the terrible occurrence, a memorial remembering those who died around that time was constructed. In 1645 along with Opole and Racibórz it returned to Poland under the House of Vasa, and in 1666 it fell to Bohemia again. Despite being outside of Polish rule after 1666, in the late 17th century church services in Polish were still held in Biała and surrounding villages. Special commercial rights granted to the town in 1699 allowed local Jews to do business with people from Bohemia, Silesia, and the rest of Poland, giving them rights equal to local Christian merchants. These rights served as the impetus for a strong Jewish immigration into Zülz, mainly in the 18th century. This earned the city the nickname Judenzülz, although the local Jewish community had given the town another nickname, the Hebrew Makom Zadik (English: Place of the Protected).

After the 1742 partition of Silesia, Zülz was annexed by the Kingdom of Prussia. The main effect of this came several decades later, in the form of an emancipation decree issued by Frederick William III. This proclamation ended the second-class status of Jews. Many Jews took this opportunity and moved to larger cities, leaving Zülz. This emigration was so strong that by 1914, the Jewish community in Zülz was largely defunct. At the same time the indigenous Polish population was subject to increasing Germanisation policies. Due to the lack of Polish schools, local Poles sent their children to schools in so-called Congress Poland in the Russian Partition of Poland. Polish activist and publicist Filip Robota, who was a Polish teacher in the town in the 1870s, became the subject of an investigation by the local Prussian administration and police for writing about this practice in the Gazeta Toruńska, a major Polish newspaper in the Prussian Partition of Poland.

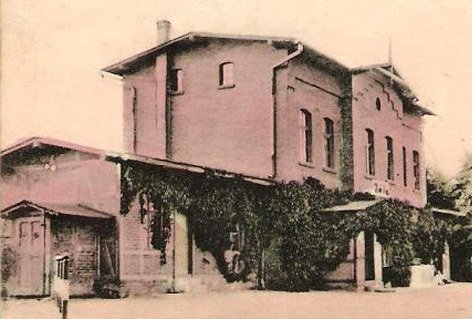
Early 20th-century view of the train station

The castle, like the town, passed through the ownership of many different groups. In 1727, the castle was still in the possession of the barons of Prószków (then Proskau), who began a restoration of both the castle and its architecturally notable 16th-century cloister. In 1748, the castle passed into the ownership of Bartolomaius von Oderfeld, as he was the new ruler of the area. In 1756, the castle became the property of count Rudolf Matuszka from Bohemia and his descendants, until the breakup of the local administrative units to which Zülz belonged, in 1841. The city of Zülz purchased the castle outright in 1874, which was then used for city business and administration until 1923. The castle became a girls' school in 1926.

The city was connected to the railroad network on October 22, 1896, with the completion of a 12 km (7 mi) railroad spur from the nearby town of Prudnik. Another connection, a 31 km (19 mi) spur connecting the city to the northeast with the town of Gogolin, was completed on December 4 of the same year.

In 1933 the Nazi Party came to power in Germany, and in 1934 Polish-language church services were cancelled. After World War II, the town passed back to Poland in accordance to the Potsdam Agreement, and its original name Biała was restored.

== Historical population ==
- 1782: 2,022
- 1787: 2,408
- 1825: 2,462
- 1905: 2,816
- 1939: 3,784
- 1961: 2,832
- 1971: 3,100
- 2021: 2,336

== Education ==
- Jarosław Iwaszkiewicz public school and preschool
- Technikum
- Zasadnicza Szkoła Zawodowa

== Economy ==
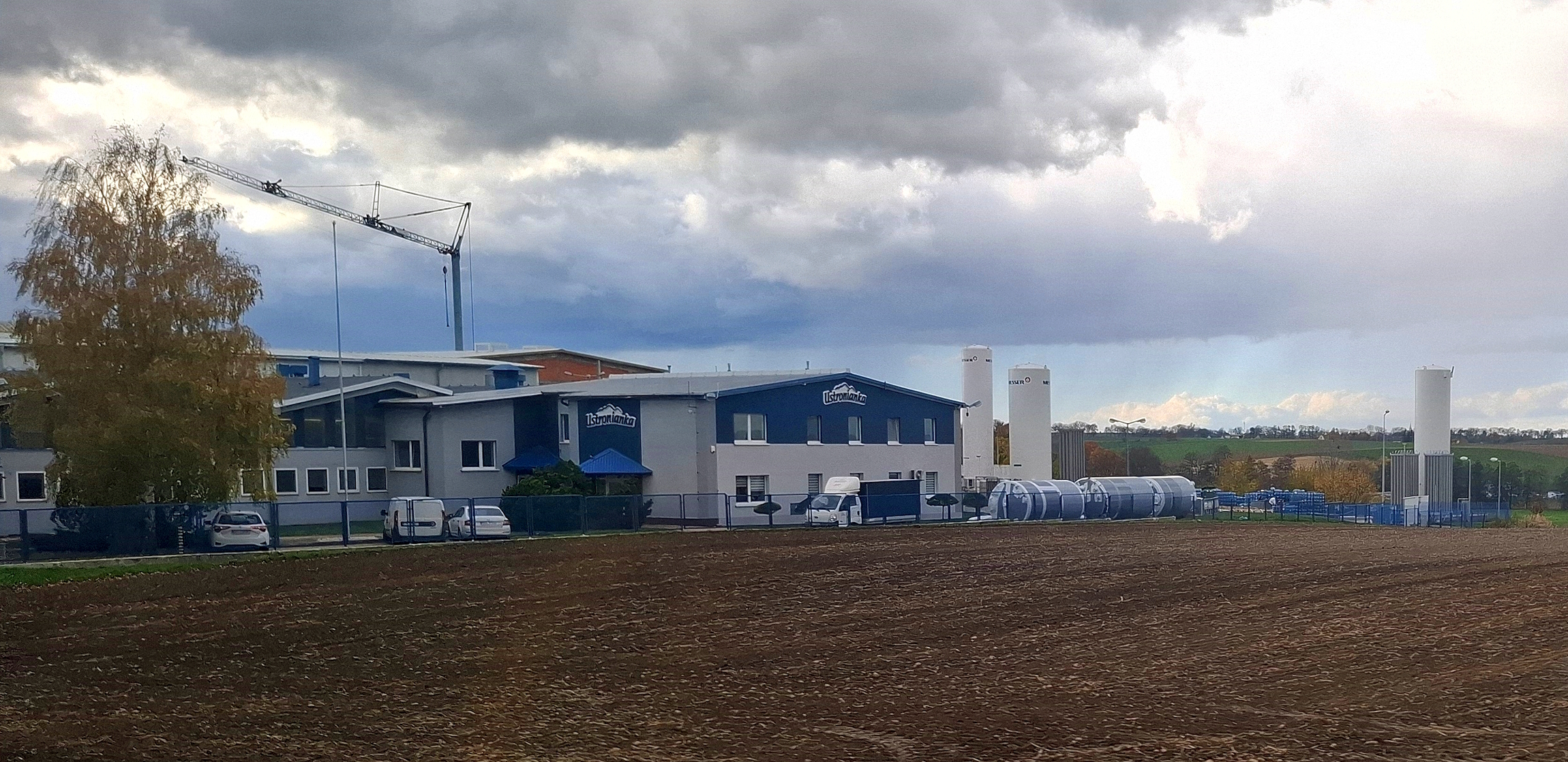
Ustronianka mineral water production plant in Biała

The biggest corporation in Biała was Zakłady Przemysłu Dziewiarskiego i Pończoszniczego w Białej Prudnickiej. Currently, the major industrial plant in Biała is Ustronianka Sp. z o.o.

== Religion ==
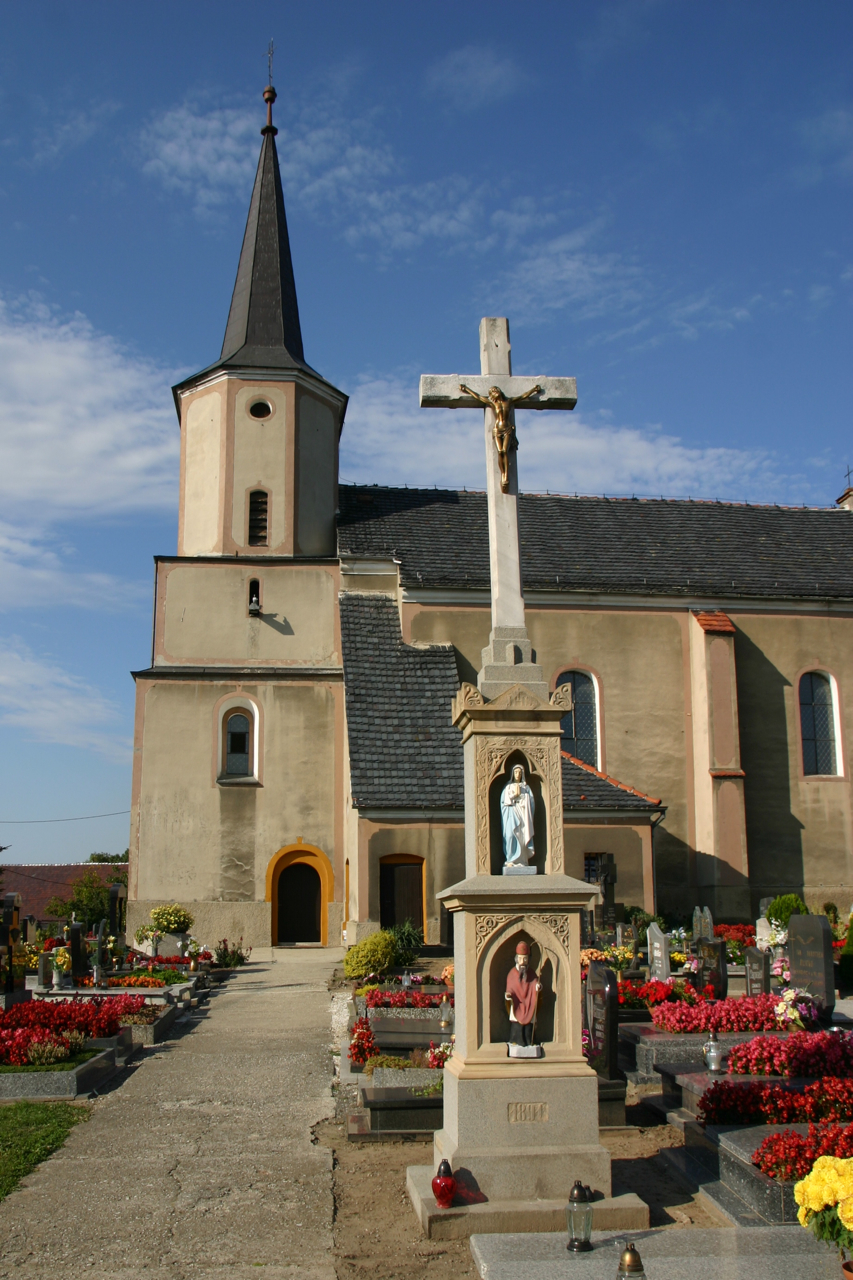
Saints Peter and Paul church

=== Catholic Church ===
- Biała Deanery
- Assumption of Mary parish (8 1 Maja St.)
- Assumption of Mary church (8 1 Maja St. )
- Saints Peter and Paul church (8 Stare Miasto St.)

=== Cemeteries ===
- Cmentarz Komunalny
- Jewish cemetery

== Sport ==
=== Sports venues ===
- Football pitch at Koraszewskiego Street
- Football pitch in the Town Park

=== Sports teams ===
- LKS Polonia Biała (football)
- AP Biała (football)
- Tigers Biała (football)
- White MTB Team Biała (cycling)

== Twin towns and sister cities ==
See twin towns of Gmina Biała.

== Notable people ==
- Solomon Pappenheim (1740–1814), theologian, writer, rabbi
- Adolf Martin Schlesinger (1769–1838), music publisher
- Samuel Fränkel (1801–1881), industrialist
- Louis Loewe (1809–1888), linguist
- David Deutsch (1810–1873), rabbi
- Filip Robota (1841–1902), local Polish teacher, activist and publisher
- Harry Thürk (1927–2005), writer
- Anna Myszyńska (1931–2019), writer
- Katarzyna Czochara (born 1969), politician, member of the Sejm (Polish parliament)
