= Lipno, Prudnik =

Lipno
- District of Prudnik
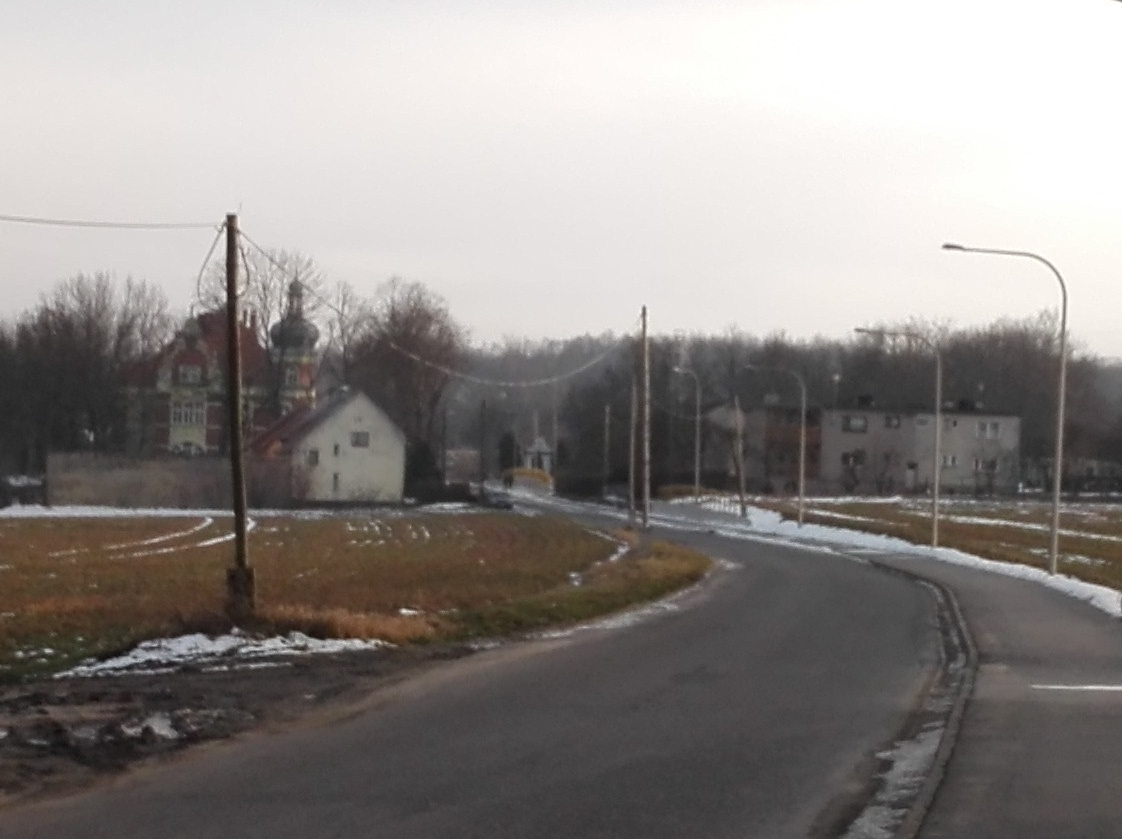

- Location within Poland Location within Opole Voivodeship
- Coordinates: 50°18′15″N 17°34′01″E
- Country: Poland
- Voivodeship: Opole
- City: Prudnik
- Area: 1.62 km^{2} (0.63 sq mi)
- Elevation: 260 m (850 ft)
- Time zone: UTC+1 (CET)
  - Summer (DST): UTC+2 (CEST)
- Area code: +48 77

Lipno (also Lipy, German: Lindenvorwerk) is a district of the city of Prudnik in southwestern Poland.

== Geography ==
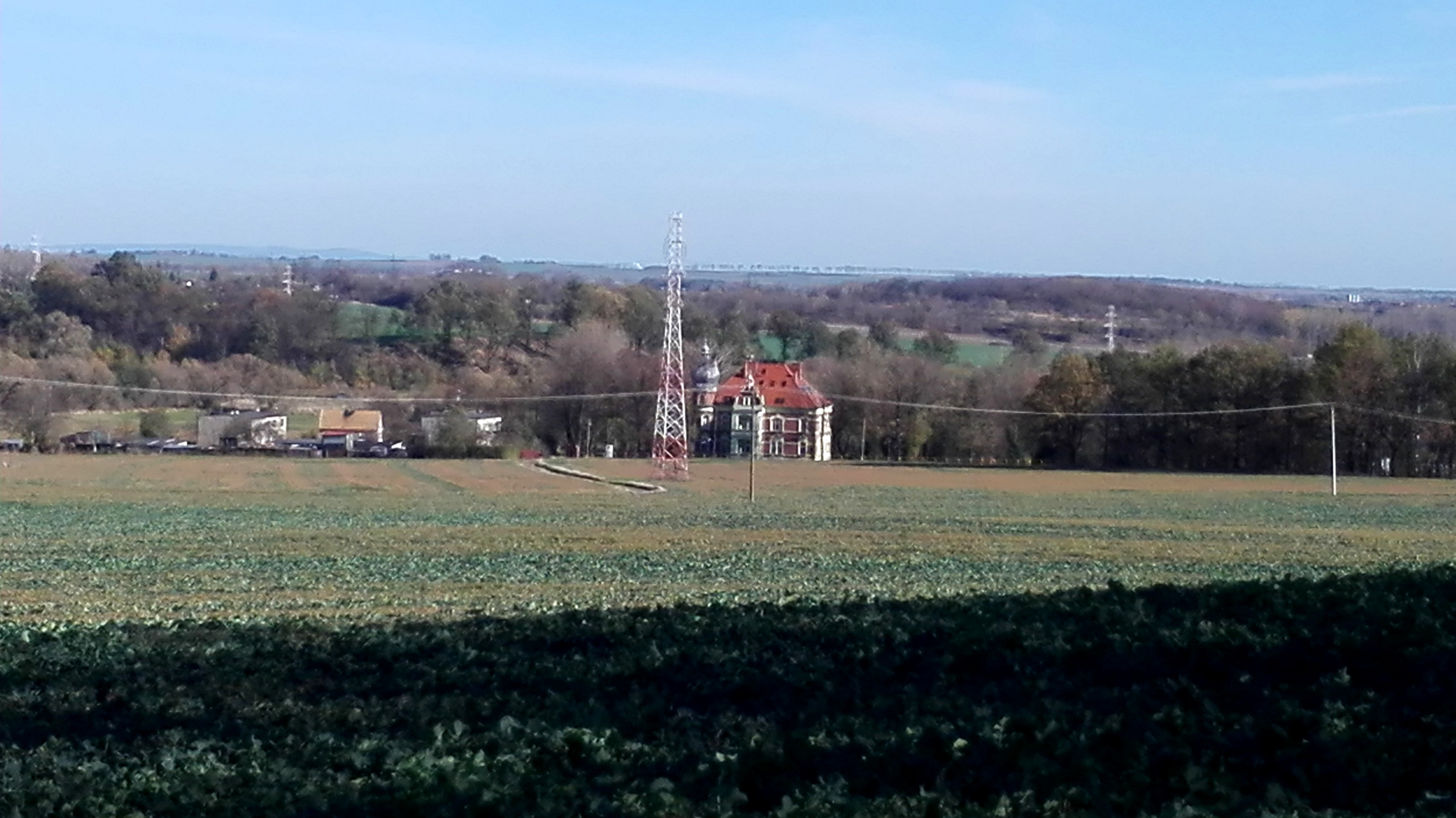
View from Kapliczna Góra

Lipno lies approximately 1.8 kilometres (1 mi) south of the centre of Prudnik and 3.2 kilometres (2 mi) from the border with Czech Republic. It is situated at the Prudnik river, on the territory of Opawskie Mountains. On the west there is Młyn Czyżyka. There are two mountains in the territory of Lipno: Klasztorne Wzgórze and Kapliczna Góra.

== History ==
In the 18th century, on the south of Prudnik, a folwark was built. Its area was 1.62 km² (0.63 sq mi). On the oldest maps it's marked as Piltz Vorwerk and Buchen Vorwerk. It was later called Lindenvorwerk. Around 1780, the owners of the folwark built a small chapel of Saint Anthony of Padua.

After some time, Lipno was taken over by the Fipper family. They built a brickyard close to it. In 1899 they built a palace. In 1896 on the territory of Lipno, a wastewater treatment plant was built.

In 1927, there were 64 people living in Lipno.

== Notable residents ==
- Stanisław Szozda (1950–2013), elite Polish cyclist

== Gallery ==
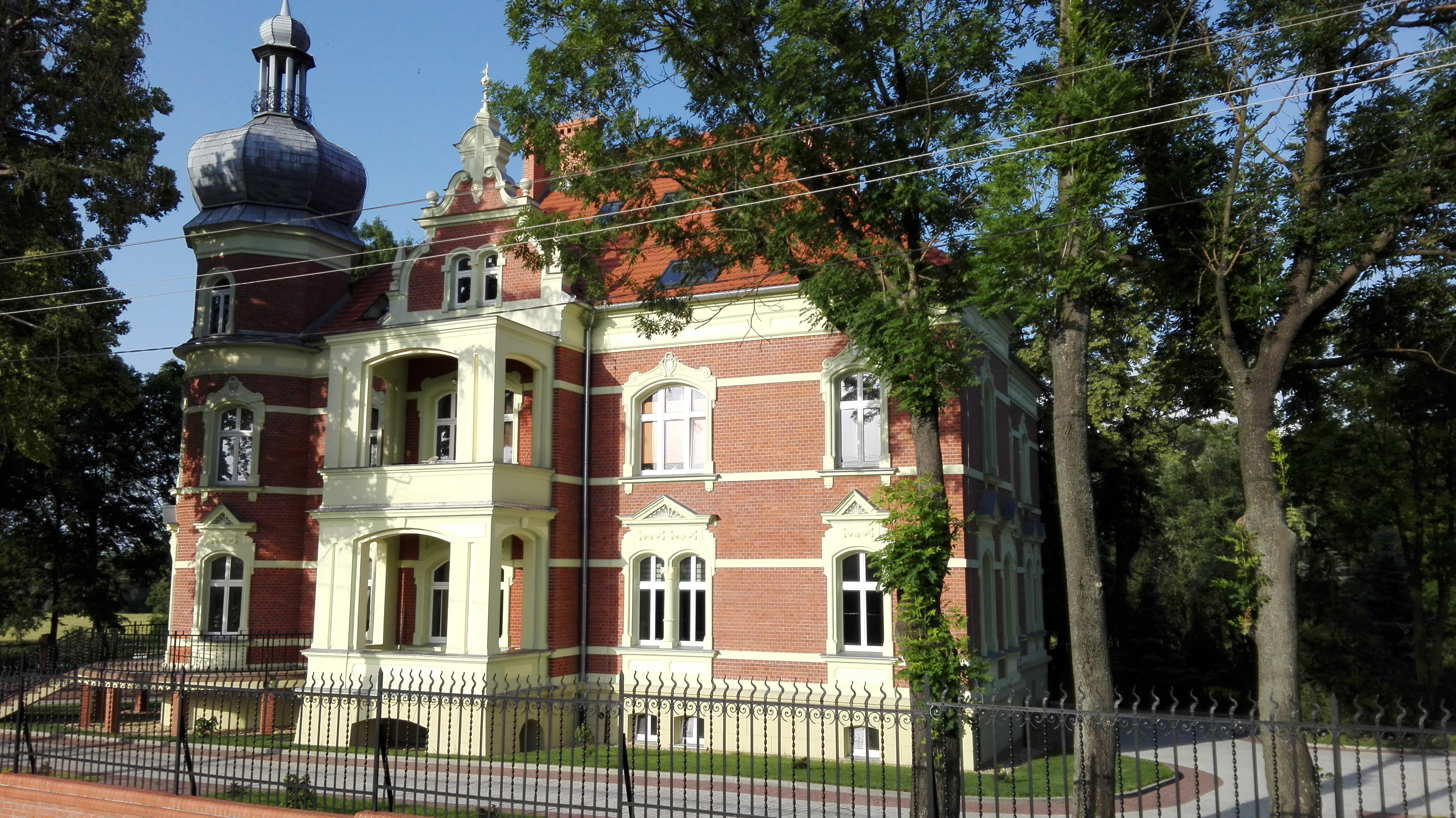
Palace in Lipno

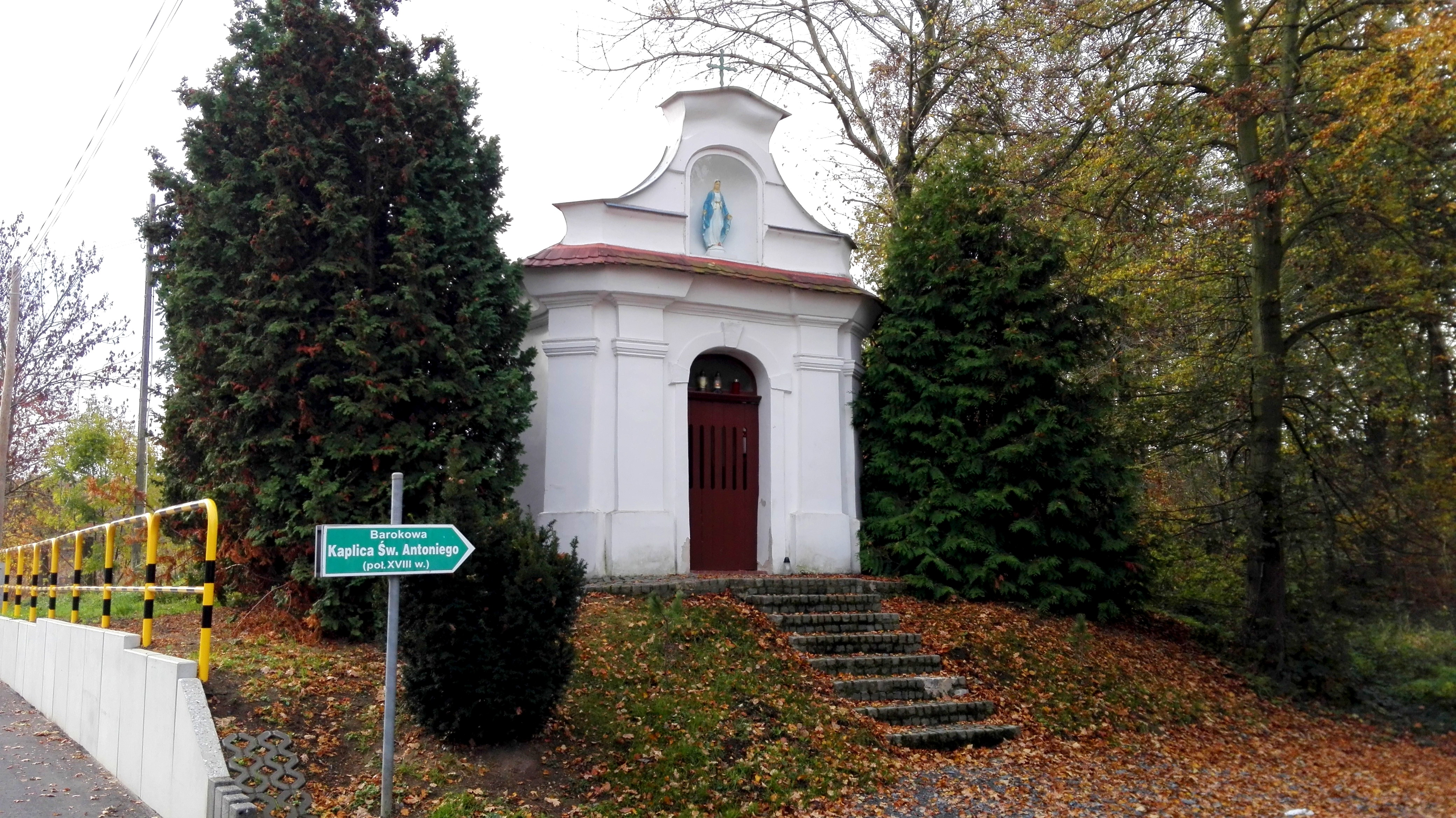
Chapel in Lipno
