= Solomon Pappenheim =

German rabbi and linguist (1740–1814)

- Born: 2 February 1740; Zülz, Silesia
- Died: 4 or 5 March 1814 (aged 74); Breslau, Silesia
- Spouse: Fridoline Heymann
- Children: Heymann Salomon Pappenheimer
- Relatives: Artur Pappenheim (great-grandson)
- Writing career
- Language: Hebrew, German
- Notable work: Yeri'ot Shelomoh (1784–1831)
- Literary movement: Haskalah

Solomon Pappenheim (Hebrew: שלמה בן זליגמן פפנהיים, German: Salomon Pappenheim; 2 February 1740 – 4 or 5 March 1814), also known by the acronym Rashap (Hebrew: רש״פ), was a German rabbi, linguist, and poet. He is best known for his three-part study of Hebrew synonyms entitled Yeri'ot Shelomoh.

== Biography ==
Solomon Pappenheim was born into a rabbinic family in Zülz, Silesia, the son of dayan Seligmann Pappenheim. He received a traditional education, and served as rabbi of the Jewish community in Lublinitz before himself becoming dayan at Breslau.

He died in Breslau at the age of 74. On his gravestone was inscribed in Hebrew Ein zeh kever ach aron kodesh ('This is not a grave but a Holy Ark').

== Work ==
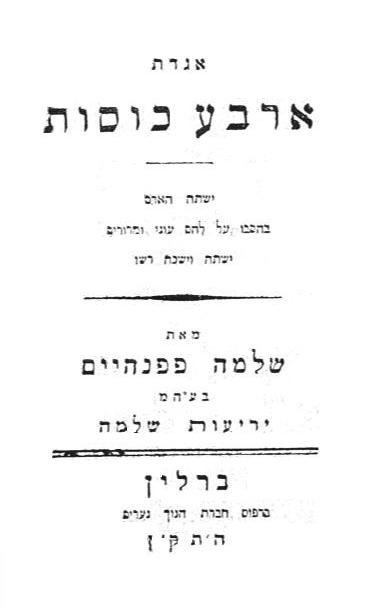
Title page of Aggadat arba kosot (1790)

Pappenheim composed a satire against Jonathan Eybeschutz entitled Elonei memre ve-kiryat arba (1761) amid the dispute between the latter and Jacob Emden. During the controversy on the subject of early burial he wrote several works in German favoring the practise among Jews: Die frühe Beerdigung bei den Juden (1795), Die Nothwendigkeit der frühen Beerdigung (1797), and Deduction Seiner Apologie für die frühe Beerdigung (1798). Against David Friedländer's views he wrote Freymüthige Erklärung über die erst jüngst rege gewordene Kritik des Gottesdienstes der Juden und deren Erziehung der Jugend (1813), in which he holds up to his nation various abuses within and without the Synagogue, declaring the need for "a convention of sensible rabbis for the purpose of remedying these abuses."

Pappenheim is especially known for his book on Hebrew synonyms and the philosophy of space and time, which appeared in three parts under the title Yeri'ot Shelomoh. The first and third were published in Dyhernfurth in 1784 and 1811, respectively, while the second was published posthumously in Rödelheim in 1831. A fourth part remained unprinted.

After losing his wife and three children in a short time, he wrote his Aggadat arba kosot, an imitation of Edward Young's Night-Thoughts in poetic prose (Berlin, 1790; Zolkiev, 1805; Vienna, 1809; with additions by M. Lemans, Amsterdam, 1817). The melancholic reflection on death and immortality survived many editions, and was translated into German by I. Wilheimer. It would go on to influence the poetry of Avraham Dov Ber and Micah Joseph Lebensohn.

Pappenheim's philosophical treatises include Beiträge zur Berichtigung der Beweise vom Dasein Gottes aus der Reinen Vernunft (1794) and Abermaliger Versuch über den Ontologischen Beweis vom Dasein Gottes (1800). Of his Hebrew lexicon Ḥeshek Shelomoh only one number, on the particles, appeared (1802). Ge'ullat Mitzrayim; Über die Erlösung aus Aegypten als Grundstein des Gesetzes was printed after his death by Hirsch Sachs (1815).

=== Partial bibliography ===
- Yeriʻot Shelomoh: ve-hu be-ur ʻal shemot nirdafim shebi-leshon ʻIvri [The Curtains of Solomon] (in Hebrew). Vol. 1. Dyhernfurth: Yeḥiel Mikhel Mai. 1784. hdl:2027/mdp.39015036716531.
- Aggadat arbaʻ kosot: yishteh ha-adam be-hesevo ʻal leḥem ʻoni u-merorim [The Legend of Four Glasses] (in Hebrew). Vienna: Georg Hraschanzky. 1809 [1790]. hdl:2027/hvd.hwnmsp.
- Beiträge zur Berichtigung der Beweise vom Dasein Gottes aus der Reinen Vernunft (in German). Breslau: C. F. Gursch. 1794.
- An die Barmherzigen zu Endor, oder über die frühe Beerdigung der Juden (in German). Breslau. 1794.
- Die frühe Beerdigung bei den Juden (in German). Breslau. 1795.
- Die Nothwendigkeit der frühen Beerdigung (in German). Breslau. 1797.
- Deduction Seiner Apologie für die frühe Beerdigung (in German). Breslau. 1798.
- Abermaliger Versuch über den Ontologischen Beweis vom Dasein Gottes (in German). Breslau. 1800.
- Ḥeshek Shelomoh [The Delight of Solomon] (in Hebrew). Breslau: Gedruckt bey Grasses Erben und Barth. 1802. hdl:2027/nyp.33433109936850.
- Speculatives Dilemma für die Existenz Gottes, als Beweis aufgestellt (in Hebrew). Breslau. 1808.
- Yeriʻot Shelomoh: ve-hu be-ur ʻal shemot nirdafim shebi-leshon ʻIvri (in Hebrew). Vol. 3. Dyhernfurth: Yosef Mai. 1811. hdl:2027/mdp.39015036716556.
- Freymüthige Erklärung über die erst jüngst rege gewordene Kritik des Gottesdienstes der Juden und deren Erziehung der Jugend (in German). Breslau. 1813.
- Ge'ullat Mitzrayim (in Hebrew). Breslau: Leib Zoltzbach. 1815.
- Yeriʻot Shelomoh: ve-hu be-ur ʻal shemot nirdafim shebi-leshon ʻIvri (in Hebrew). Vol. 2. Rödelheim: Wolf Heidenheim. 1831. hdl:2027/mdp.39015036716549.
