= Summer of Dead Dreams =

Book by Harry Thürk

- Author: Harry Thürk
- Original title: Sommer der toten Träume
- Language: German
- Genre: autobiography with fictional elements
- Publisher: Mitteldeutscher Verlag
- Publication date: 1993
- Publication place: Germany
- Media type: Print (paperback)
- Pages: 340
- ISBN: 9783898122412

Summer of Dead Dreams (German: Sommer der toten Träume) is a novel by German writer Harry Thürk, published in 1993 by Mitteldeutscher Verlag. It is an autobiography with fictional elements.

The book was translated to English, Polish (by Marcin Domino and Anna Myszyńska), Czech (by Miroslava Mamulová), Russian, Chinese, Slovak, Hungarian, Lithuanian, Vietnamese, Spanish and Finnish.

Małgorzata Jurczak was planning a film adaptation of the book, but it was delayed due to a lack of money.

The characters presented in the book are fictional, but the story is inspired by author's real experiences.

== Plot summary ==
The novel tells about three Germans: Oswald Hirschke, Jakob Latta and Schliebitz and a Romani woman called Alina. The story takes place in the summer of 1945 in Prudnik, shortly after the end of World War II. The main characters live in a ghetto on Chrobrego and Królowej Jadwigi Street, created by the Red Army in April 1945 after the end of the Battle of Prudnik. They are being used by Poles that came to Prudnik after the war and Russian soldiers. They are trying to escape to East Germany.
