= Harry Thürk =

German writer

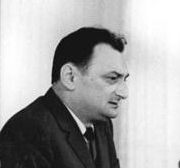
- Harry Thürk in 1967
- Born: 8 March 1927 Zülz, Germany
- Died: 24 November 2005 (aged 78) Weimar, Germany
- Occupation: Writer
- Citizenship: German
- Period: 1950–2001

Website
- www.harrythuerk.de

Harry Thürk (8 March 1927 – 24 November 2005) was a German writer.

== Life ==
In 1934, Thürk moved with his family to Neustadt. After attending trade school, he began to work for the German train system (Reichsbahn). After being drafted in 1944 and participating in World War II, he returned to Neustadt, which was renamed to Prudnik at the end of the war. However, he was forced to flee from Poland to Weimar. From 1946 to 1948 he worked with the Free German Youth organization in East Germany. After taking a variety of jobs, he became a journalist for a number of different newspapers and had the opportunity to work as a reporter in Southeast Asia during the Vietnam War and also in Korea. He claimed to have been affected by Agent Orange with lifelong effects.

He was married in 1953. Between 1956 and 1958, he worked with the Chinese magazine China Pictorial. After additional travels in East Asia between 1964 and 1980 (including Laos, Cambodia, Vietnam, Korea, China), he returned to Weimar. There between 1971 and 1983 he was the chairman of the writers union in Thuringia.

In 1995 he resigned from the German PEN organization.

== Work ==
With his 2004 book Treffpunkt Wahrheit Thürk had published sixty books altogether, including novels, nonfiction, and children's books, as well as screenplays. His topics and exciting prose made him especially popular in East Germany, and he had altogether nine million copies printed in nine different languages. However, he remained relatively unknown in West Germany.

Among his best-known works are the anti-war novel Die Stunde der toten Augen and the novels Amok and Der Gaukler. Many of his novels take place in Southeast Asia or in his first home of Upper Silesia. In his later years, his writings dealt with current political themes in reunified Germany.

Thürk was a very controversial author because of his political themes as well as the frequent sex scenes in his novels. In the Der Gaukler, he portrayed Aleksandr Solzhenitsyn as a tool of the CIA. However, Thürk, a member of the Socialist Unity Party also prompted controversy within the Communist sphere, for example with his depictions of battle scenes involving German troops against the Red Army in his novel Die Stunde der toten Augen (1957).

== Awards and honors ==
- 1964 National Prize of East Germany
- 1971 Theodor-Körner-Preis (DDR)
- 1977 National Prize of East Germany

== Selected works ==
=== Stories ===
- Nacht und Morgen, 1950
- Treffpunkt Große Freiheit, 1954
- Goldener Traum Jugend, 1996
- Auch überm Jangtse ist Himmel, 2001

=== Novels ===
- Die Herren des Salzes, 1956
- Die Stunde der toten Augen, 1957
- Der Narr und das schwarzhaarige Mädchen, 1958
- Das Tal der sieben Monde, 1960
- Der Wind stirbt vor dem Dschungel, 1961
- Verdorrter Jasmin, 1961
- Lotos auf brennenden Teichen, 1962
- Die weißen Feuer von Hongkong, 1964
- Der Tod und der Regen, 1967
- Der Tiger von Shangri-La, 1970
- Amok, 1974, situated into Indonesia during the 1965-66 massacres.
- Des Drachens grauer Atem, 1976
- Der Gaukler (2 Bde.), 1978
- Der schwarze Monsun, 1986
- Operation Mekong, 1988
- Die Lagune, 1991
- Summer of Dead Dreams, 1993
- Piratenspiele, 1995

==== Crime novels ====
- Der maskierte Buddha, 1991
- Die toten Masseusen von Kowloon, 1992
- Tod auf Tahiti, 1993
- Die tätowierte Unschuld, 1994
- Tuan Subutu läßt schießen, 1995
- Das letzte Aloha, 1996
- Schwarze Blüte – sanfter Tod, 1997
- Hongkongs Leichen sind sehr tot, 1998
- Der Tod kam aus Shanghai, 1999
- Mord mit zarter Hand, 2000

=== Children's books ===
- Fahrten und Abenteuer von Pitt und Ursula, 1955/56
- Su-su von der Himmelsbrücke, 1960
