= Nemmersdorf =

Nemmersdorf may refer to:

== Places ==
- former German name of the settlement Mayakovskoye, today Kaliningrad Oblast, Russia
- part of Goldkronach, a town in the district of Bayreuth, Germany

== People ==
- "Franz von Nemmersdorf", pen name of Franziska von Reitzenstein (1834–1896), German novelist

== Events ==
- Nemmersdorf massacre
