= Quis custodiet ipsos custodes? =

Latin for "Who will watch the watchmen?"

Quis custodiet ipsos custodes? is a Latin phrase found in the Satires (Satire VI, lines 347–348), a work of the 1st–2nd century Roman poet Juvenal. It may be translated as "Who will guard the guards themselves?" or "Who will watch the watchmen?".

The original context deals with the problem of ensuring marital fidelity, though the phrase is now commonly used more generally to refer to the problem of controlling the actions of persons in positions of power, an issue discussed by Plato in the Republic. It is not clear whether the phrase was written by Juvenal, or whether the passage in which it appears was interpolated into his works.

== Original context ==
The phrase, as it is normally quoted in Latin, comes from the Satires of Juvenal, the 1st–2nd century Roman satirist. Although in its modern usage the phrase has wide-reaching applications to concepts such as tyrannical governments, uncontrollably oppressive dictatorships, and police or judicial corruption and overreach, in context within Juvenal's poem it refers to the impossibility of enforcing moral behaviour on women when the enforcers (custodes) are corruptible (Satire 6, 346–348):

audio quid ueteres olim moneatis amici,
"pone seram, cohibe." sed quis custodiet ipsos
custodes? cauta est et ab illis incipit uxor.

Translation:

I hear always the admonishment of my friends:
"Bolt her in, constrain her!" But who will watch the
watchmen? The wife plans ahead and begins with them!

Modern editors regard these three lines as an interpolation inserted into the text. In 1899 an undergraduate student at Oxford, E. O. Winstedt, discovered a manuscript (now known as O, for Oxoniensis) containing 34 lines which some believe to have been omitted from other texts of Juvenal's poem. The debate on this manuscript is ongoing, but even if the verses are not by Juvenal, it is likely that it preserves the original context of the phrase. If so, the original context is as follows (O 29–33):

... noui
consilia et ueteres quaecumque monetis amici,
"pone seram, cohibes." sed quis custodiet ipsos
custodes? qui nunc lasciuae furta puellae
hac mercede silent crimen commune tacetur.

Translation:

... I know
the plan that my friends always advise me to adopt:
"Bolt her in, constrain her!" But who will watch the
watchmen? They keep quiet about the girl's
secrets and get her as their payment; everyone hushes it up.

== Reference to political power ==
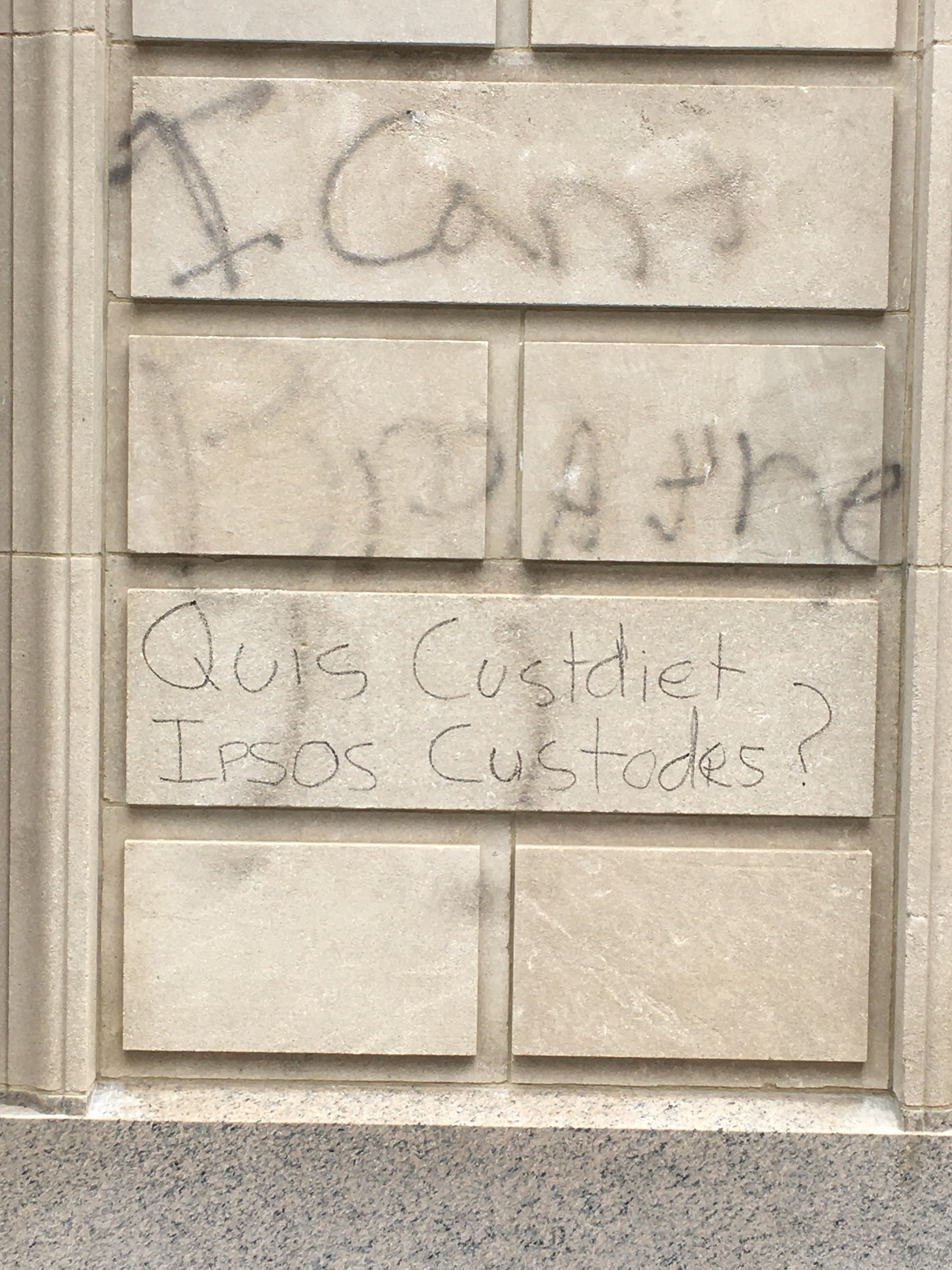
"Quis custodiet ipsos custodes" written (misspelling "custodiet" as "custdiet") on a wall in Washington, DC during the George Floyd protests

This phrase is used in general to consider the embodiment of the philosophical question as to how power can be held to account. It is sometimes incorrectly attributed as a direct quotation from Plato's Republic in both popular media and academic contexts. There is no exact parallel in the Republic, but it is used by modern authors to express Socrates' concerns about the guardians, whose solution is to properly train their souls.

Several 19th-century examples of the association with Plato can be found, often dropping "ipsos". John Stuart Mill quotes it thus in Considerations on Representative Government (1861), though without reference to Plato. Plato's Republic though was hardly ever referenced by classical Latin authors like Juvenal, and it has been noted that it simply disappeared from literary awareness for a thousand years except for traces in the writings of Cicero and St. Augustine. In the Republic, a putatively perfect society is described by Socrates, the main character in this Socratic dialogue.

Socrates proposed a guardian class to protect that society, and the custodes (watchmen) from the Satires are often interpreted as being parallel to the Platonic guardians (phylakes in Greek). Socrates's answer to the problem is, in essence, that the guardians will be manipulated to guard themselves against themselves via a deception often called the "noble lie" in English. As Leonid Hurwicz pointed out in his 2007 lecture on accepting the Nobel Memorial Prize in Economic Sciences, one of Socrates's interlocutors in the Republic, Glaucon, even goes so far as to say "it would be absurd that a guardian should need a guard."

The issue of the accountability of political power, traced back to different passages of the Old and New Testaments, received great attention in medieval and early modern Christian thought, especially in connection with the exercise of authority in the Church and in church-state relations. In the Protestant tradition it also animated the debate about who was to be the final arbiter in the interpretation of the Scriptures.

In his 2013 report to the UN Human Rights Council, Alfred-Maurice de Zayas, the United Nations Independent Expert on the Promotion of a Democratic and Equitable International Order, elucidated Juvenal's continued relevance: “Crucial remains the conviction that the government should serve the people and that its powers must be circumscribed by a Constitution and the rule of law. Juvenal's question quis custodiet ipsos custodes (who guards the guardians?) remains a central concern of democracy, since the people must always watch over the constitutional behaviour of the leaders and impeach them if they act in contravention of their duties. Constitutional courts must fulfil this need and civil society should show solidarity with human rights defenders and whistleblowers who, far from being unpatriotic, perform a democratic service to their countries and the world.”

== See also ==
- Homunculus fallacy
- Infinite regress
- Police misconduct § Video and audio recording
- Sousveillance
