= Nedd Willard =

American author and artist (1926–2018)

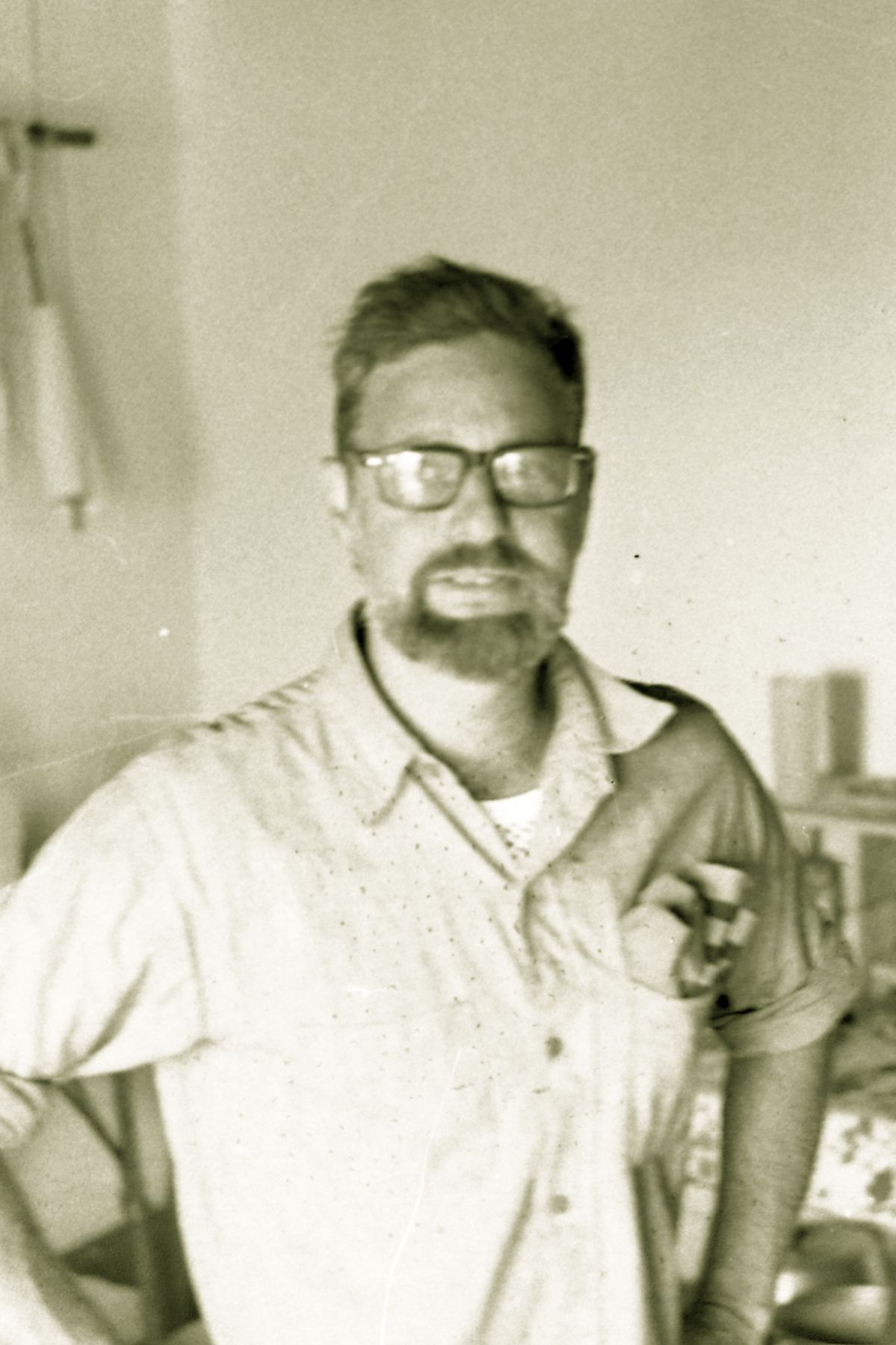
Willard in 1969

Nedd Willard (August 23, 1926 – July 12, 2018) was an American author and artist living in Thorens-Glières, France, and Geneva, Switzerland. He was a merchant sailor, university teacher and worked in public relations for the World Health Organization.

== Biography ==
Born in New York City, Willard was a merchant sailor on the Hudson River and on the Atlantic Ocean during the Second World War, after which he hitchhiked across the United States, doing odd jobs to earn his living. He toured Spain on a motorcycle in the 1960s and earned his doctorate at the Sorbonne with a dissertation on the subject of "Genius and Madness in the 18th Century".

Willard taught at the University of New Hampshire and Columbia University and then began work at international institutions. In 1959 he was director of the Federation of French Alliances in the United States.

Willard spent three months of professional activity in Ethiopia and three months in Cameroon. For six years he was chief of public information for the World Health Organization in India and Southeast Asia, followed by an assignment as editor-in-chief of World Health magazine of the same agency. He then became editor of UN Special, a magazine for international civil servants in Geneva. In 1981, he was the information attaché for a world survey in preparation for the organization's fifth World Conference on Smoking and Health.

He became a free-lance journalist and was a member of the Advisory Circle of the Seva Foundation.

== Family ==
In 1956, Willard was married to Diana Kent (Sharp), whom he met while she was doing postgraduate work in French literature at the Sorbonne, where Willard was teaching. They had a son, Ethan, and a daughter, Briar.

His second wife was Lucia Maloney, a classical Indian dancer who died September 21, 1976, in London, England. His third wife was Poppy Willard.

Willard died in Switzerland in July 2018 at the age of 91.

== Works ==
=== Print ===
- "Julien Green: A World Both Violent and Poetic," manuscript archival material, 1952
- La Moralité du Théâtre de Louis-Sébastien, Mercier, Paris, 1955
- Le Génie et la Folie au Dix-Huitième Siècle (1963) Paris: Presses Universitaires de France. Of that book, science historian Mirko Drazen Grmek wrote:
  Willard diligently analyzes the conception of Man, Genius and Madness such as it appears in the writings of Diderot, in the Encyclopédie, in the Tableau de Paris, by Louis-Sébastien Mercier and in the works of Offray de La Mettrie and the marquis de Sade. It is a pity that Willard omits pointing to the medical works of this era (Pinel, Cabanis, etc.). And, what's more, that he ignores, it seems, several of the most important studies on this subject (Lange-Eichbaum, Semelaigne, etc.). The author does not make the necessary distinction between neuroses, psychoses and troubles of intelligence. Nevertheless, this monograph is a useful contribution to the knowledge about the position taken by the principal French literary and scientific movement in the 18th century concerning the "irrational" behavior of the individual.
- A Hard Look at Drugs, 1967, World Health Organization
- "Welcome schizophrenia, Jet-lag in Geneva," Ex Tempore, an International Literary Journal, December 2001
- "Running breathlessly, the enemies, spring in dying, teach me to be a tree," Ex Tempore, December 2001
- "Picasso Is a Cannibal," essay, Ex Tempore, December 2002
- "Curtains for the Che," essay, Ex Tempore, December 2002
- "Our Swords are Made of Tin, The Sailor’s Prayer," Ex Tempore, December 2002
- Travels With a Thin Skin, 2010, Gardners Books
- The Giant Who Was So Small, children's book

=== Musical cassette ===
- "Avoidable Disablement," with John Wilson, Ruth Landy, Lucas T. Tandap, World Health Organization, 1984

=== Film ===
- Act of Love (1953), actor
