= Nemmersdorf massacre =

1944 World War II incident

Coordinates: 54°31′12″N 22°03′56″E

Nemmersdorf Massacre
- Part of the Gumbinnen Operation, Eastern Front (World War II)
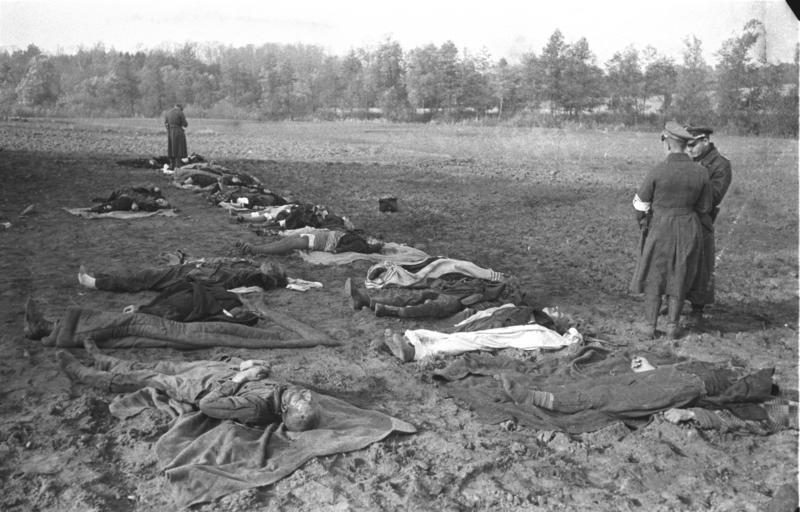
- Murdered German civilians in Nemmersdorf, October 1944, German Federal Archive
- Location: Nemmersdorf, East Prussia
- Date: 21 October 1944
- Target: German civilians, French and Belgian POWs
- Attack type: Massacre, wartime rape
- Deaths: ~74 German civilians; ~50 French and Belgian POWs
- Perpetrator: 2nd Guards Tank Corps

The Nemmersdorf massacre was a civilian massacre perpetrated by Red Army soldiers in the late stages of World War II. Nemmersdorf (present-day Mayakovskoye, Kaliningrad Oblast) was one of the first prewar ethnic German settlements to fall to the advancing Red Army during the war. On 21 October 1944, Soviet soldiers killed many German civilians as well as French and Belgian POWs.

== Incident ==
The 2nd Battalion, 25th Guards Tank Brigade, belonging to the 2nd Guards Tank Corps of the 11th Guards Army, crossed the Angerapp bridge and established a bridgehead on the western bank of the Rominte river on 21 October 1944. The German forces tried to retake the bridge, but several attacks were repelled by the Soviet tanks and the supporting infantry. During an air attack, a number of Soviet soldiers took shelter in an improvised bunker that was already occupied by 14 local men and women. According to the testimony of a seriously injured woman, Gerda Meczulat, when a Soviet officer arrived and ordered everybody out, the Soviets shot and killed the German civilians at close range. During the night, the Soviet 25th Tank Brigade was ordered to retreat across the river and take defensive positions along the Rominte. The Wehrmacht regained control of Nemmersdorf and discovered the massacre.

== Evidence ==
Nazi German authorities organized an international commission to investigate, headed by the Estonian Hjalmar Mäe and other representatives of neutral countries, such as Francoist Spain, Sweden and Switzerland. It heard the report from a medical commission, which reported that all of the dead females had been raped (they ranged in age from 8 to 84). The Nazi Propaganda Ministry (separately) used the Völkischer Beobachter and the cinema news series Wochenschau to accuse the Soviet Army of having killed dozens of civilians at Nemmersdorf and having summarily executed about 50 French and Belgian noncombatant prisoners-of-war, who had been ordered to take care of thoroughbred horses but had been blocked by the bridge. The threat to Germans of a Russian (Soviet) occupation was pushed by the ministry.

The former chief of staff of the German Fourth Army Major General Erich Dethleffsen, testified on 5 July 1946 before an American tribunal in Neu-Ulm:

When in October, 1944, Russian units temporarily entered Nemmersdorf, they tortured the civilians, specifically they nailed them to barn doors, and then shot them. A large number of women were raped and then shot. During this massacre, the Russian soldiers also shot some fifty French prisoners of war. Within forty-eight hours the Germans re-occupied the area.

== Wartime propaganda ==
At the time, the Nazi Propaganda Ministry disseminated a graphic description of the events to dehumanize Soviets in eyes of German soldiers. On the home front, civilians reacted immediately, with an increase in the number of volunteers joining the Volkssturm. More civilians, however, responded with panic and started to leave the area en masse.

To many Germans, Nemmersdorf became a symbol of war crimes committed by the Red Army and an example of the worst behaviour in Eastern Germany. Marion Dönhoff lived in the village of Quittainen (now Kwitany) in western East Prussia, near Preußisch Holland (now Pasłęk) at the time of the reports. She wrote in 1962 as post-war co-publisher of Die Zeit:

In those years, one was so accustomed to everything that was officially published or reported being lies, that, at first, I took the pictures from Nemmersdorf to be falsified. Later, however, it turned out that that was not the case.

== Reinvestigation ==
After the 1991 fall of the Soviet Union, new sources became available and the dominant view among scholars became that the massacre had been embellished and actually exploited by Goebbels in an attempt to stir up civilian resistance to the advancing Soviet Army. Bernhard Fisch, in his book, Nemmersdorf, October 1944. What actually happened in East Prussia, concluded that liberties were taken with at least some of the photographs, some victims on the photographs were from other East Prussian villages, and the notorious crucifixion barn doors were not even in Nemmersdorf. Additionally, the writer Joachim Reisch, who also claimed to be witness to the events, placed the Soviet presence in Nemmersdorf to less than four hours of heavy fighting in front of the bridge, before pulling back to defensive positions.

Ian Kershaw is among the historians who believe that the Soviet forces committed a massacre at Nemmersdorf, but the details and numbers are disputed. The German Federal Archives (Bundesarchiv) contain many contemporary reports and photographs by officials of Nazi Germany of the victims of the Nemmersdorf massacre. In the late 20th century, Alfred de Zayas interviewed numerous German soldiers and officers who had been in the Nemmersdorf area in October 1944, to learn what they saw. He also interviewed Belgian and French prisoners-of-war who had been in the area and fled with German civilians before the Soviet advance. De Zayas incorporated those sources into two of his own books: Nemesis at Potsdam and A Terrible Revenge.

== See also ==
- Metgethen massacre
- Red Army atrocities
- Gegenmiao massacre
- The Crucified Soldier (World War I)

== General references ==
- Koschorrek, Gunter. Blood Red Snow, The Memoirs of a German Soldier in the Eastern Front Zenith Press, ISBN 978-0-7603-2198-0
- Brandenburg, Christel Weiss and Dan Laing. Ruined by the Reich: Memoir of an East Prussian Family, 1916–1945. McFarland & Company; ISBN 0-7864-1615-7
- Reisch, Joachim. `Perkallen Versunkenes Paradies in Ostpreußen´ Landgut und Pferdegestüt zwischen Rominten und Trakehnen – Dokumentation (1999)
- Archived website mirroring various reports about Nemmersdorf (in German)
- German TV channel ZDF: Die Wahrheit über Nemmersdorf (in German)
