= A Terrible Revenge =

Non-fiction book

A Terrible Revenge: The Ethnic Cleansing of the East European Germans, 1944–1950
- Author: Alfred-Maurice de Zayas
- Language: English
- Publisher: St. Martin's Press
- Publication date: 1994
- ISBN: 0-312-12159-8

A Terrible Revenge: The Ethnic Cleansing of the East European Germans, 1944–1950 is a 1994 non-fiction book written by Cuban-born American lawyer Alfred-Maurice de Zayas, former research fellow at MPG in Heidelberg, Germany. The work is based on a collection of testimonials from German civilians and Wehrmacht military personnel; and devoted to the expulsion of Germans after World War II from states previously occupied by Nazi Germany. It includes as well selected interviews with British and American politicians who participated at the Potsdam Conference, including Robert Murphy, Geoffrey Harrison (drafter of article XIII of the Potsdam Protocol), and Denis Allen (drafter of article IX on the provisional post-war borders). The book attempts to describe the crimes committed against the German nation by the Soviet Union, Poland, Czechoslovakia, Hungary and Yugoslavia at the end of World War II – as perceived by the expellees themselves and settlers brought in Heim ins Reich (Home into the Empire) from the east.

The author begins with the history of German settlement in Central and Eastern Europe since the 12th century, the impact of the Treaty of Versailles on German minorities in Poland and Czechoslovakia, the failure of the League of Nations system of minority protection, the outbreak of World War II and selected crimes committed by the Nazis, followed by the story of refugees from the former Eastern parts of Germany (Silesia, East Prussia, Pomerania, East Brandenburg), as well as the fate of German minorities in Czechoslovakia, Hungary, Poland, Romania, Yugoslavia and the Soviet Union.

In the book, de Zayas claims that approximately two million Germans died during the post period of 1944–1949, although his claim does not withstand scrutiny. Most recent research on the subject has put the number at around half a million.

== Printing history ==
The book originated as a script for a television documentary by the Bavarian Broadcasting. It was a popular rendition of the author's monography on the expulsions called the Nemesis at Potsdam (German: Die Nemesis von Potsdam). This shorter introduction to the subject was published in German as Anmerkungen zur Vertreibung der Deutschen aus dem Osten (4 editions during 1986–1996, Kohlhammer Verlag, Stuttgart, ISBN 3-17-009297-9), first printed in English under the title of The German Expellees: Victims in War and Peace (St. Martin's Press, New York, 1993, Macmillan, London). The new, 1994 English title, included the then neologism "ethnic cleansing", used at that time in relation to the crimes committed by Serbs in Croatia and Bosnia and Herzegovina of the 1990s. The 5th expanded German 2006 edition was titled Die deutschen Vertriebenen (Leopold Stocker Verlag, ISBN 3-902475-15-3). The book ends with 12 historical theses, 14 legal theses and 10 conclusions. It was positively reviewed in Germany by Andreas Hillgruber in the Historische Zeitschrift and Gotthold Rhode in the Frankfurter Allgemeine Zeitung.

The 2006 English edition was expanded by about 20%. It contains additional information from interviews with the children of the displaced, German expellees who migrated to the United States and Canada, new photos and new statistical tables.

== Reviews ==
"This popularly written but still scholarly study follows the author's other successful books in the fields of history and international law [which] were hailed by historians as well as lawyers as masterpieces of academic craftsmanship. His book presents in a nutshell the history of the ethnic German population which had settled in the early 13th century in large parts of what is nowadays Eastern Europe." Netherlands International Law Review 1986, pp. 430–431.

"This is the story of the ethnic Germans who found themselves in the wrong place at the wrong time. Some two million died and fifteen million were displaced – driven from their lands by those opposed to anyone and everything German... De Zayas's moving plea is that one's home should be a human right. As frontiers once more shift in Eastern Europe and families flee in Bosnia, he could hardly have chosen a better moment to deliver it." The Times, (London) 18 November 1993.

== Criticism ==
One reviewer, Rainer Ohliger of Humboldt University, argues that de Zayas over-emphasizes the role of the Bund der Vertriebenen (non-governmental association representing the expellees) and its property and territorial claims. It has been noted that no West–East migration occurred when this possibility arose after the unification of the German states, and that practically no Germans have returned to the East after the Baltic States, Poland, Czechoslovakia, Hungary and Romania entered the European Union.

The book has also been criticized for its victim perspective, normally unsuitable for scholarly works, unfavourably comparing it with a more recent book of Detlef Brandes. The 2006 revised and enlarged edition of "Terrible Revenge" with Palgrave/Macmillan takes some of these considerations into account. In the introduction the author notes that a "Terrible Revenge" is a popularized version of his longer monograph "Nemesis at Potsdam" (1–3 editions Routledge, 6th edition Picton Press, Rockland, Maine 2003). See also review of the Future of Freedom Foundation.

Other reviews have criticized both de Zayas and Brandes reversely. According to Eagle Glassheim on the H-Net website, Brandes does not provide any moral conclusion deriving from violence against civilians due to their ethnic heritage.

Genocide historians Donald Bloxham and Tony Kushner describe the book as "tendentious".

== See also ==
- Against Their Will, a historical research book by Pavel Polyan
- Forced labor of Germans in the Soviet Union
- Journey Back to Youth, a 2001 documentary film
- Nemmersdorf massacre of 21 October 1944, in Kaliningrad Oblast
- Soviet war crimes from 1919 onward
