= Alfred-Maurice de Zayas =

Cuban–American lawyer and historian (born 1947)

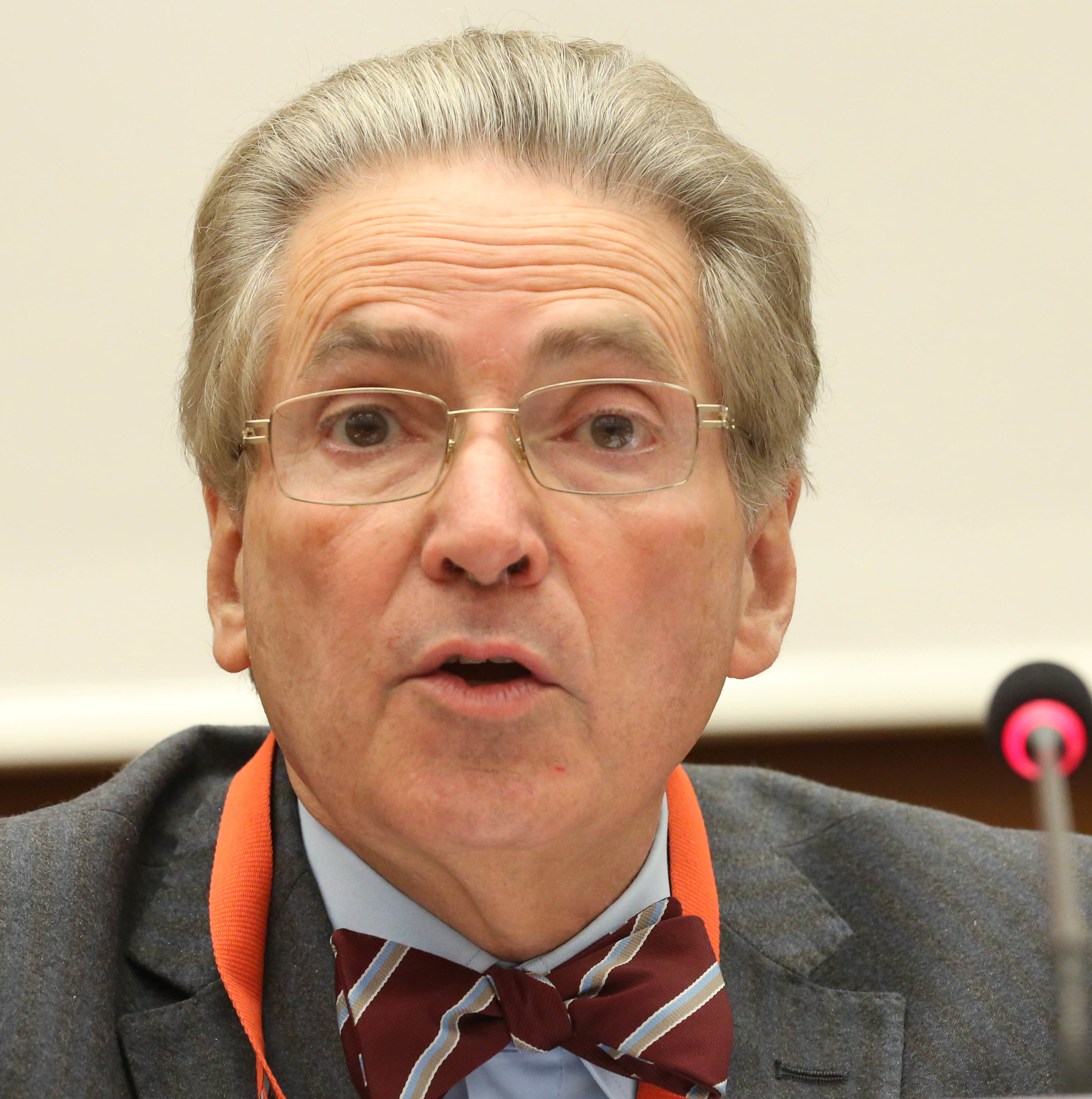

United Nations Independent Expert on the Promotion of a Democratic and Equitable International Order
- In office 1 May 2012 – 30 April 2018
- Preceded by: Position established
- Succeeded by: Livingstone Sewanyana

Personal details
- Born: Alfred-Maurice de Zayas; 31 May 1947 (age 79) Havana, Cuba
- Citizenship: American; Swiss
- Party: Republican (since 1968) (Note: Asked in an interview over a month following the 2020 presidential election and about "the course of the election and Joseph Biden's victory", de Zayas stated: "First of all, I would like to say that I have been a member of the Republican Party since 1968. At that time I was a student at Harvard University, and my political persuasion aimed at a social, ethical market economy. Times have changed, and of course I am no longer a "Republican", although I have not formally abandoned my membership in the Republican Party. I no longer feel any necessity to "root" for any political party".)
- Spouse: Carolina Jolanda Edelenbos (m. 1996)
- Relatives: Alfredo Zayas y Alfonso (great-grandnephew)
- Education: Harvard University (JD); University of Göttingen (PhD)

Alfred-Maurice de Zayas (born 31 May 1947) is a Cuban-born American lawyer and writer, active in the field of human rights and international law. From 1 May 2012 to 30 April 2018, he served as the first UN Independent Expert on the Promotion of a Democratic and Equitable International Order, appointed by the United Nations Human Rights Council.

== Early life and education ==
De Zayas was born in Havana, Cuba and grew up in Chicago, Illinois (US). He earned his juris doctor degree from Harvard Law School, then a doctorate of philosophy in modern history from the University of Göttingen (Germany).

He was a Fulbright Fellow at the University of Tübingen in Germany and research fellow at the Max Planck Institute for Comparative Public Law and International Law in Heidelberg, Germany. He worked with the United Nations from 1981 to 2003 as a senior lawyer with the Office of the UN High Commissioner for Human Rights and the Chief of Petitions.

Since 1996, de Zayas has been married to Carolina Jolanda Edelenbos, a Dutch national and UN official, with whom he had a son, Stefan (deceased).

== Scholarly work ==
De Zayas' work focuses inter alia on the judicial protection of peoples and minorities. He has written and lectured extensively on human rights, including the jurisprudence of the United Nations Human Rights Committee, the Armenian genocide, the Holocaust, the US-run detention centers at Guantanamo Bay, ethnic cleansing in the former Yugoslavia, the expulsion of Eastern European Germans after the Second World War, the invasion of Cyprus by Turkey in 1974, the rights of minorities, the right to freedom of opinion and expression, and the rights of indigenous peoples.

In 1994, he co-authored with Prof. Cherif Bassiouni, The Protection of Human Rights in the Administration of Criminal Justice, published by Transnational Publishers.

De Zayas, in collaboration with Justice Jakob Möller, authored the book United Nations Human Rights Committee Case Law 1977-2008 (2009), published by N. P. Engel Verlag. The first Chairman of the Human Rights Committee, Andreas Mavrommatis, wrote a preface for the handbook. In a review published in the UN Special magazine, former UN High Commissioner for Human Rights Bertrand Ramcharan wrote: "It is staggering how much the Human Rights Committee has influenced the human rights jurisprudence of the world, as is striking from reading this exceedingly important book.... From the outset of its work in 1977 there have been two Secretariat pioneers in developing the case law of the Committee when it considers petitions from individuals claiming violations of their rights: Jakob Möller (Iceland) and Alfred de Zayas (USA). Möller was the first Chief of the Petitions branch of what is today the Office of the High Commissioner for Human Rights and de Zayas was his colleague, who eventually succeeded him as Chief."

=== On the 1944–1950 expulsion of Germans ===
De Zayas' work into the expulsion of Germans from areas of eastern Germany and Eastern Europe at the end of World War II is extensive. De Zayas was reportedly the first American historian to address this topic. Deutsche Welle reported in 2007: "He wrote the first scholarly work on German expellees to appear in English, breaking what had long been a taboo topic." The German Federal Minister Heinrich Windelen wrote in the foreword to de Zayas's book Anmerkungen zur Vertreibung: "It is thanks to De Zayas that the debate on The Expulsion has been reopened [...] In the subsequent period, a number of authors have drawn on the work of De Zayas. Thus, he has contributed significantly to the fact that discussion of The Expulsion is no longer considered taboo." According to a doctoral thesis on the historiography of the expulsion, "de Zayas was one of the earliest 'respectable' academics to take up the cause of the expellees... De Zayas does not mention the Holocaust, the Jews, or any other minority ethnic groups that suffered under the Nazis except in passing." However, Professor Doerr in the Dalhousie Review notes: "De Zayas does not ignore the enormity of the crimes committed by Germans during the course of the war, nor does he deny that an anti-German feeling was natural and that punishment was justified, He does, however, question whether one set of crimes justified a second... whether revenge ... was not only extended to the guilty but to the innocent, whether expulsion itself was a crime ...While critical of western leadership, de Zayas leaves no doubt about the agents of the crime-- the Soviet leaders. ...Praised must be de Zayas's reopening of this largely neglected aspect of modern German history." The 1999 University of Hertfordshire doctoral dissertation of Robert Bard, Historical Memory of the expulsion of ethnic Germans in Europe 1944–1947, comments on the historical analysis of Nemesis at Potsdam and A Terrible Revenge: "De Zayas' senior position with the UN Human Rights Commission, his position as a United States citizen (not a German) and his indisputable humanitarian credentials meant that de Zayas' work was taken seriously in Germany and America."

In 1975, de Zayas published a study in the Harvard International Law Journal, questioning the legality of the expulsion of possibly as many as 15 million Germans from their homes after World War II, invoking the Atlantic Charter, the Hague Conventions, and the Nuremberg Principles.

==== Nemesis at Potsdam ====
The article was followed by his first book Nemesis at Potsdam (Routledge und Kegan Paul, 1977) which focused on what, if any, responsibility the British and U.S. governments had for decisions which purportedly led to the expulsions of these ethnic Germans. The book had a preface by Dwight Eisenhower's political advisor, Robert Daniel Murphy, a participant at the Potsdam Conference.

British historian Tony Howarth reviewed it in the Times Educational Supplement as "a lucid, scholarly and compassionate study". Nuremberg prosecutor Ben Ferencz wrote in the American Journal of International Law that it was "a persuasive commentary on the suffering which becomes inevitable when humanitarianism is subordinated to nationalism". The New Statesman reviewer stated: "in his well researched, closely reasoned work, de Zayas leaves little doubt that there have been few historical parallels to this record of modern mass atrocity".

In the same year, an enlarged German edition was published by the legal publisher C.H. Beck, becoming a bestseller.

==== The Wehrmacht War Crimes Bureau ====
His second book (written with Walter Rabus), The Wehrmacht War Crimes Bureau, was published in Germany by Universitas/Langen Müller, in 1979, and the English translation by de Zayas himself by the University of Nebraska Press in 1989. The book describes some of the work of the Wehrmacht-Untersuchungsstelle, a special section of the legal department of the Oberkommando der Wehrmacht, which investigated Allied and German war crimes. The authors argue that the Bureau carefully investigated war crimes and was largely free of Nazi ideology. De Zayas worked with the 226 extant volumes (about half of the total, the rest apparently having been burned in Langensalza, Germany, near the end of the war.). The book was savagely attacked in the media of the Soviet Union and its satellites.

In a review of the book in the Cambridge Law Journal, Professor of International Law at the University of Cambridge and judge at the International Court of Justice (ICJ) Christopher Greenwood considered the book to be "excellent" and that "the authors deserve the gratitude of all those interested in the laws of war but unable to read German for bringing out an English edition." He goes on to add that "Throughout the book the authors emphasize that all the cases they examined have to be seen against the background of the Holocaust and the atrocities committed by the German armed forces and SS."

In the Fletcher Forum, Alfred Rubin stated that "De Zayas is undoubtedly one of the world's leading legal scholars addressing forced population transfers ... [his] work provides massive confirmation of the truism that atrocities are committed in war by all sides, that many go unpunished, and some are part of national policy....the possibility that truth might be misused in argument by the devil is not a reason to suppress truth. I have no personal doubt that this book is a useful attempt to preserve an important truth. By writing it, the author – whose own humanitarian sympathies are beyond question, as is Levie's scholarly detachment --has done a service to scholarship." Dieter Fleck, in Archiv des Voelkerrechts, underlined that "this well-written book is based on thorough research of original sources." The British novelist Philip Kerr took the WUSt functionaries as subject of his novel A Man Without Breath, published 2013 by Penguin; in the "Author's note" (p. 463) Kerr writes: "The Wehrmacht War Crimes Bureau continued to exist until 1945. Anyone who wishes to know more about its work should consult the excellent book of the same name by Alfred de Zayas."

In the Historical Journal (Cambridge), vol. 35, 1992, de Zayas published a detailed analysis of the working methods of The Wehrmacht Bureau on War Crimes. The FAZ favourably reviewed the article: "Following careful study of the records, cross-checking in foreign archives and more than three hundred interviews with surviving witnesses and military judges, de Zayas arrives at the conclusion that the investigations are reliable." The International Committee of the Red Cross has republished parts of The Wehrmacht War Crimes Bureau in its teaching manual How does Law Protect in War, edited by Marco Sassoli and Antoine Bouvier.

==== A Terrible Revenge ====
His third book was A Terrible Revenge, The Ethnic Cleansing of the East European Germans, 1944–1950, published in Germany in 1986, and in the United States in 1993 by Palgrave Macmillan under the title The German Expellees. According to PhD candidate Robert Bard, this book "was, as [de Zayas] says, written 'to generate interest in this hitherto ignored tragedy [the German ethnic expulsions] and lead to a new respect for these forgotten victims and to more compassion and understanding for our neighbours.' De Zayas in his introduction states that the book originated in a 1981 'prime-time television broadcast in Germany' which dealt with the expulsions, and in which he took part."

The book was described as "problematic" by historians Konrad Jarausch and Michael Geyer. Historians Dan Diner and Joel Golb write that the tendency of "allow[ing] the Germans to perceive themselves also as victims" is "manifest in the work of the best-selling author Alfred-Maurice de Zayas". Nottingham Trent University’s Bill Niven writes that de Zayas is "often cited in support of the comparability thesis", i.e. the argument that crimes committed by Germany during the war were equivalent to crimes committed against it. A review in the scholarly journal Central European History describes it as having a "distinctively revisionist flavour".

By contrast, Andreas Hillgruber wrote in the Historische Zeitschrift: " His succinct and incisive recounting of the events are summarized in ten historical and six international law theses, that precisely because of their lucidity and balance deserve a permanent place in the historiography of the expulsions." Gotthold Rhode wrote in the FAZ: "de Zayas lets the victims themselves tell their story, providing reports that were hitherto unknown... the book has the character of a new 'Documentation on the Expulsions' and contains descriptions of cruelties and suffering that four decades after the events boggle the mind." Henry Stanhome in the London Times wrote: "De Zayas's moving plea is that one's home should be a human right. As frontiers once more shift in Eastern Europe and families flee in Bosnia, he could hardly have chosen a better moment to deliver it." (18 November 1993) Publishers Weekly: "This relatively unknown holocaust claimed more than two million lives...De Zayas... has uncovered testimony in German and American archives detailing these atrocities, adding a new chapter to the annals of human cruelty. His carefully documented book serves as a reminder that many different peoples have been subjected to 'ethnic cleansing'". (July 1994). Twenty years later Matthias Stickler reviewed a revised edition in the Frankfurter Allgemeine Zeitung: "Es vermittelt anschaulich, gut lesbar, quellenorientiert und ohne Polemik Grundwissen zu einem nach wie vor wichtigen Thema" ("the book imparts knowledge on a still very relevant topic vividly, in straightforward language, based on reliable sources and without polemics)." Historian Ernest Fisher reviewed it in the United States Army magazine Army: "The author has given the history of these expulsions a dramatic immediacy through a series of eyewitness accounts ... The remarkable sequel to this recital of inhumanity is that this displaced population has, in the 50 years since the war, managed to find a new home in a reunited Germany where nearly 20 percent of the population is made up of first- or second-generation descendants of these exiled millions." De Zayas' book Nemesis at Potsdam likewise received a positive review in the Neue Zürcher Zeitung by historian Patrick Sutter.

==== Genocide as State Secret ====
His 2011 book Völkermord als Staatsgeheimnis (Genocide as State Secret) with a substantive preface by Karl Doehring, Director of the Max Planck Institute for International Law in Heidelberg, explored the issue of who knew what when about the Holocaust. He is the first historian to have reviewed the issue in the light of published and unpublished Nuremberg documents, and in the light of interviews with Nuremberg prosecutors and defense attorneys, Holocaust survivors as well as German military judges and politicians. He argued that the policy of exterminating the Jews was "geheime Reichssache" (secret Reich business), and treated pursuant to Hitler's Order Nr. 1 (Führerbefehl Nr. 1) as a "state secret". Accordingly, although there were diffuse rumors about killings, no one except a very limited number of persons knew exactly what was going on, neither the industrialization of the killing nor the number of victims.

German historian Martin Moll wrote that de Zayas' book ignored the fact that in other research, scholars have found convincing evidence that knowledge of murders was partial but present. Overall, he found the book to be "a hard-to-read, confusing, poorly argued book that lags far behind the differentiated state of research represented primarily by [Peter] Longerich".

The review by Bernward Dörner in the Frankfurter Allgemeine Zeitung described it as an "attempt to deny contemporary perceptions of genocide", while the French-German Historian Alfred Grosser strongly criticized the Dörner review as political and "completely one-sided", accusing the reviewer of ideological bias and unhistorical approach. Grosser cited the reviewer's own words on "strategy": "The question of contemporary perception of the Holocaust is of strategic importance. Because if it had actually been the case that the genocide could have remained secret, this would severely limit the shared responsibility of the German population in the genocide." In other words, as the title of Grosser's article implies ("the return of collective guilt"), it is a question of instrumentalizing guilt for political purposes, and Zayas was not playing the game.

The journal of the Institute on the Holocaust and Genocide in Jerusalem, Genocide Prevention Now, observed in its review: "As the footnotes abundantly manifest, de Zayas is keenly aware of the secondary literature in the field. He takes issue with some of the conclusions of historians like Goldhagen, Gellately, Longerich and Bankier, and tends to agree with the analysis of Michael Marrus, Gordon Craig, Peter Hoffmann and Hans Mommsen. But while he carefully considers the opinions of other scholars, he does not rehash what is already in the secondary literature – he takes a fresh look at the evidence, poses new questions – and proposes possible answers, avoiding guessing and extrapolation. He places the evidence in historical context, avoiding the anachronisms that some historians indulge in."

== Activism ==
De Zayas was co-president, with Jacqueline Berenstein-Wavre, of the Association Suisses et Internationaux de Genève (ASIG) from 1996 to 2006.

Since the 1990s, de Zayas has also focused on the genocides against the Armenians, Greeks of Pontus and Assyro-Chaldeans under the Ottoman Empire before, during, and after the First World War. He advocates the creation of a Constitutional Convention for Cyprus and published a proposal for this together with Malcolm Shaw and Andreas Auer. He has argued for the recognition of "the human right to peace".

In 2018 de Zayas sent a Memorandum to Gary W. B. Chang, Jeannette H. Castagnetti, and Members of the Judiciary for the State of Hawaii, speaking out against the continued prolonged U.S. occupation of The Hawaiian Kingdom.

He has called for a peaceful solution to the dispute between India and Pakistan in accordance with pertinent UN resolutions and the right of self-determination of the Kashmiris.

He has advocated the rights of many minorities and indigenous peoples to autonomy and self-determination in United Nations fora and before parliamentarians in the European Parliament, including the Armenians of Nagorno Karabagh, the Sahrawi population of Western Sahara, the Tamils of Sri Lanka, the Bubis of Equatorial Guinea, the Catalans of Spain, and the Igbos and Ogonis of Nigeria. de Zayas is an advocate of reviewing certain decolonization issues in the light of the UN Charter and General Assembly resolutions. In particular, he has criticized the Spanish amalgamation of the distinct Bubi people of Bioko Island with the people of another Spanish colony, Equatorial Guinea.

Since his early retirement from the UN in 2003, de Zayas has been a vocal critic of the 2003 Iraq War He has criticised indefinite detention in Guantanamo, secret CIA prisons, and extreme poverty.

In 2015, he sparked a condemnation from UN Watch for saying the November 2015 Paris attacks were caused by the United States, Western colonialism, capitalism, and "Israeli settlers" and "a response to grave injustices and ongoing abuses perpetrated by the dominant, primarily developed countries, against populations of less developed countries".

On 29 September 2017, de Zayas, and another UN independent commissioner, David Kaye, issued a statement saying that the Spanish government was "violating fundamental individual rights, limiting the flow of public information at such a critical moment for the Spanish democracy" during the 2017 Catalan independence referendum. According to Spanish newspaper Okdiario, Catalan President Carles Puigdemont paid de Zayas €100 000 to support the Catalan independence process.

De Zayas is a registered Republican voter, although he supported Bernie Sanders in 2016, and Tulsi Gabbard (via write-in) in 2020. Writing in 2018 in the Canadian magazine Humanist Perspectives, he warned about the growing radicalism of the Antifa movement in Germany, reminiscent of the Nazi SA of the 1930s: "A new wave of totalitarianism is sweeping through Germany with the collusion of the mainstream media, which ... seldom criticize Antifa" and downplay their anti-democratic violence. On several occasions de Zayas has been invited as an expert before German courts and before the Rechtsausschuss (legal committee) of the German Bundestag, invited by the CDU/CSU.

He joined the board of trustees of the Alternative für Deutschland (AfD)'s "Desiderius Erasmus Foundation" think tank in 2018. In 2019, he spoke before the Menschenrechtsausschuss (Human Rights Committee) of the Bundestag, in March on the issue of humanitarian aid and in September on the issue of impunity. On this occasion De Zayas was invited as an expert by the AfD to speak on multilateralism in the 21st century, a lecture which he gave in the aula maxima of the University of Tuebingen in May 2019.

== United Nations Independent Expert ==
De Zayas was appointed as "Independent Expert on the promotion of a democratic and equitable international order" by the U.N. Human Rights Council at its 19th Session, which concluded on 23 March 2012.

He presented his first report to the UN Human Rights Council at its 21st session in September 2012, calling for uniform application of international law. On 10 September 2013, he presented his second report to the Human Rights Council A/HRC/24/38, and, in October 2013 his second report to the GA . A/68/284, to the UN General Assembly exploring initiatives and enforcement mechanisms to further advance a democratic and equitable international order, in particular through a World Parliamentary Assembly. On 10 September 2014, de Zayas presented his third report on the promotion of a democratic and equitable international order to the Human Rights Council. During its 27th session in September 2014, the Human Rights Council extended his mandate through 2018 pursuant to resolution A/HRC/RES/27/9.

On 27 October 2014, he presented his third report to the General Assembly on the right to self-determination (A/69/272) In the press release issued the following day, he stated: "The realization of the right of self-determination is essential to maintaining local, regional and international peace and must be seen as an important conflict-prevention strategy."

On 10 September 2015, he presented his fourth report to the council on the adverse human rights impacts of free trade and investment agreements on a democratic and equitable international order, and on 26 October 2015 to the General Assembly on the issue of investor state dispute settlement. The main observations of these reports were reported by news outlets such as Reuters, The Guardian, The Huffington Post, and The Independent. In 2015, the US based magazine of global politics, Foreign Policy, consulted with the UN Independent Expert on the application of the right to self-determination in the Indonesian region of West Papua.

During his mandate, he addressed multiple contemporary world issues, welcoming the Arms Trade Treaty and urging States to regulate not only trade but also production of arms. In 2015, following a press release, de Zayas urged trade negotiators to address the Doha Round commitments to promote equal and fair trade at the Tenth Ministerial Conference in Nairobi, Kenya.The Guardian published his op-ed on adverse human rights impacts of free trade and investment agreements. In the following year, the UN Independent Expert on the Promotion of a Democratic and Equitable International Order submitted his report on the adverse impact of World Bank policies on human rights and the realisation of a democratic and equitable international order to the UN Human Rights Council. On 21 July 2017, de Zayas presented his last report to the UN General Assembly on the human rights impact of IMF policies and practice. The report was sent to the UN Human Rights Council on 25 January 2018. On 15 March 2018, he formulated his 23 principles of international order.

In 2017, a 1982 photo of de Zayas in blackface which he had posted on his website was described as "racist and offensive" by UN Watch.

On 25 February 2018, The UN Independent Expert issued a memorandum that states: "I have come to understand that the lawful political status of the Hawaiian Islands is that of a sovereign nation-state in continuity; but a nation state that is under a strange form of occupation by the United States resulting from an illegal military occupation and fraudulent annexation. As such, international laws (The Hague and Geneva Conventions) require that governance and legal matters within the occupied territory of the Hawaiian Islands must be administered by the application of laws by the occupied state (in this case, the Hawaiian Kingdom) not the domestic laws of the occupier (the United States)."

=== Report on Venezuela ===
In late 2017 de Zayas visited Venezuela. In a February 2018 interview with Telesur, de Zayas, said "I’ve compared the statistics of Venezuela with those of other countries and there’s no humanitarian crisis". He said that Venezuela's economic problems were caused by the "economic war" and "economic sanctions placed by the U.S., Canada and the European Union". De Zayas' report, published in August 2018, found internal overdependence on oil, poor governance and corruption had damaged the Venezuelan economy, but that "economic warfare" was a major factor in the crisis. He recommended economic sanctions be investigated by the International Criminal Court as possible crimes against humanity under Article 7 of the Rome Statute. The report was received positively by the Venezuelan government.

More than eighty Venezuelan organizations questioned de Zayas' conclusions that there was not a humanitarian crisis in the country. In a public statement, the organizations said that before finishing his mission in Venezuela and without having processed the information provided by the organizations, de Zayas formed an opinion prematurely and assumed the government's point of view, which blames the "economic warfare" and "blockade" for the food and medical supplies shortages. The organizations said that in two years, among twenty two experts from twelve international organizations, de Zayas' report was the only one to say there was no humanitarian crisis in the country. Alí Daniels, director of the NGO Acceso a la Justicia (Access to Justice), said that Venezuelan and Ecuadorian organizations said that, since the mission was not prepared according to independence standards of the United Nations, it could not reach valid or acceptable conclusions for the UN Human Rights Council. Daniels argued that this lack of balance was demonstrated in Zayas' report, where twelve pages are dedicated to Venezuela and only two and a half to Ecuador.

During the 167th session of the Inter-American Commission of Human Rights, during a discussion of health and nutrition in Venezuela, the Venezuelan state representative screened an interview by state broadcaster Telesur with de Zayas, in which he stated there was not a humanitarian crisis in the country. Nutrition expert Susana Raffalli, advisor to PROVEA and Caritas Organization of Venezuela, said de Zayas used poor evidence to support his claim, and that by then four United Nations rapporteurs had already declared that there was a "grave" situation in the country. Raffali said that de Zayas was only one out of forty rapporteurs, and that during his visit to the country and after meeting with civil society organizations, de Zayas only took pictures of the counter of the charcuterie in front of his hotel.

== Literary works ==
Apart from his scholarly work in the fields of history and law, de Zayas has published poetry in English, French, German, Spanish, and Dutch, has translated the poetry of Rainer Maria Rilke into English, French, and Spanish, and has translated works by Joseph von Eichendorff Zayas has published many anti-war poems, including "Beatitudes" in Sam Hamill's "Poets Against the War", "Apocalypse" and "Dinosaurs", published in Esoteric Magazine, "Panem et circensis" published in Esoteric Magazine."Manichaean games", published in Ex Tempore.

As a member of the International Rainer Maria Rilke Society of Sierre, Switzerland, de Zayas published the first English-language translation of Rilke's "Larenopfer", 90 poems dedicated to Rilke's homeland of Bohemia and his home city of Prague Zayas has lectured on Rilke in Austria, Germany, Switzerland and Canada. On 2 May 2011, he delivered a lecture at the Salon du Livre de Genève (Geneva bookfair) on "Rilke, poète de la Heimat"

A member of International PEN since 1989, he was Secretary-General of the Centre Swiss Romande of PEN PEN Club in 2002–06, and its president 2006–10; 2010–13 he was a member of the centre's executive committee, and in 2013 was again elected president through 2017. De Zayas was coordinator of the three Swiss PEN Centres Switzerland during 2008–10 and 2013–14. He served for fifteen years as president of the United Nations Society of Writers, in Geneva.

From 1990 to 2005, he was president of the United Nations Society of Writers (UNSW) and editor-in-chief and founder of its literary journal Ex Tempore. In November 2019 he was reelected editor-in-chief of Ex Tempore.

== Awards ==
- Georg Dehio Prize, 1980.
- "Dr. Walter-Eckhardt-Ehrengabe für Zeitgeschichtsforschung" ("Dr. Walter Eckhardt Award for Contemporary History") from Ingolstadt Research Institute for Contemporary History, 2001.
- "Scholarly Achievement Award" of the Armenian National Committee of America, 8 November 2003
- Cultural Prize (Kulturpreis) of the city of Geislingen (Baden-Württemberg, Germany) for his Rilke and Hesse translations, 2008
- Educator's Award, Canadians for Genocide Education, 31 March 2011.

== Selected works ==
=== Books ===
- Building a Just World Order (1st ed.). Clarity Press, Atlanta, Georgia, 2021. ISBN 978-1-949762-42-6
- 80 Thesen zur Vertreibung. Aufarbeiten anstatt Verdrängen, together with Konrad Badenheuer, Verlag Inspiration, London and Berlin, 2019: ISBN 978-3-945127-29-2
- Völkermord als Staatsgeheimnis [Genocide as State Secret], Olzog Verlag, München, 2011; ISBN 978-3-7892-8329-1
- The Genocide against the Armenians and the relevance of the 1948 Genocide Convention, Beirut, Lebanon: Haigazian University Press, 2010; ISBN 978-9953-475-15-8
- The United Nations Human Rights Committee Case Law 1977-2008 (together with Jakob Th. Möller), N.P.Engel Publishers, Kehl/Strasbourg, 2009; ISBN 978-3-88357-144-7
- 50 Thesen zur Vertreibung London/Berlin: Verlag Inspiration Un Limited, 2008; ISBN 978-3-9812110-0-9 50 Theses on the Expulsion of the Germans from Central and Eastern Europe, Verlag Inspiration Un Ltd.: London and Berlin, 2012; ISBN 978-3-9812110-4-7
- Rainer Maria Rilke. Die Larenopfer Bilingual English-German edition with commentary. Los Angeles: Red Hen Press, 2005; ISBN 1-59709-010-7; second revised edition with a preface by Ralph Freedman, 2008.ISBN 978-1-59709-080-3.
- International Human Rights Monitoring Mechanisms (with Gudmundur Alfredsson and Bertrand Ramcharan). The Hague: Kluwer, 2001; ISBN 90-411-1445-9. New revised edition, Brill 2009; ISBN 978-90-04-16236-5.
- Heimatrecht ist Menschenrecht Universitas Verlag, 2001; ISBN 3-8004-1416-3
- Nemesis at Potsdam: The Expulsion of the Germans from the East Routledge (1979) ISBN 978-0897253604; 7th ed. Rockland, Maine: Picton Press, 2003; ISBN 0-89725-360-4. 14. revised German edition Die Nemesis von Potsdam, Herbig, Munich 2005, isbn .
- A Terrible Revenge: The Ethnic Cleansing of the East European Germans. New York: St. Martin's Press, 1994; ISBN 1-4039-7308-3; second revised edition, Palgrave/Macmillan, New York 2006.
- The Wehrmacht War Crimes Bureau, 1939-1945 (with Walter Rabus). Lincoln: University of Nebraska Press, 1989; ISBN 0-8032-9908-7. New revised edition with Picton Press, Rockland, Maine; ISBN 0-89725-421-X. German edition: Die Wehrmacht Untersuchungsstelle, 7th revised and enlarged edition Universitas/Langen Müller, Munich 2001; 8th revised and enlarged edition Lindenbaum Verlag, 2012; ISBN 978-3-938176-39-9.
- The Protection of Human Rights in the Administration of Criminal Justice (with Cherif Bassiouni). New York: Transnational Publishers, 1994 ISBN 094-1-320-87-1.
- — (1 February 2007). Die deutschen Vertriebenen – Keine Täter sondern Opfer: Hintergründe, Tatsachen, Folgen [The German expellees – not perpetrators but victims: background, facts, consequences] (in German). ARES Verlag. ISBN 978-3902475152. LCCN 2006502139. OCLC 71328804. OL 16302134M.

=== Articles and chapters ===
- 4 entries in Dinah Shelton (ed.) Encyclopedia of Genocide. Macmillan Reference, 2005, "Aggression", "Ismael Enver", "Nelson Mandela", "Raoul Wallenberg".ISBN 978-00-28-65847-6.
- 6 entries in David Forsythe, Encyclopedia of Human Rights (Oxford 2009): P.E.N. International and Human Rights, Jose Ayala Lasso, Aryeh Neier, Kenneth Roth, Simon Wiesenthal and Bertrand Ramcharan; ISBN 978-0-19-533402-9.
- 18 entries in the Encyclopaedia of Public International Law, edited by Rudolf Bernhardt, Amsterdam: Elsevier, Vol. 1–5, 1992–2003, including "Amnesty Clause", "United Nations High Commissioner for Human Rights", "Combatants", "Spanish Civil War", "Population Expulsion", "Repatriation", "Open Towns", "Curzon Line", "Territory, Abandonment", "Territory, Discovery", "United States Dependent Territories", "European Recovery Program", "Westphalia, Peace of", etc. ISBN 0 444 86246 3
- 6 entries in the Max Planck Encyclopaedia of Public International Law, edited by Rüdiger Wolfrum, Oxford, 2012, including "Forced Population Transfer", "Guantanamo Naval Base", "Marshall Plan", ISBN 978-0-19-929168-7
- "The United Nations High Commissioner for Human Rights" in Helmut Volger (ed.) Concise Encyclopaedia of the United Nations, The Hague: Kluwer, 2002 (2nd revised edition 2009). ISBN 9789047444541
- "Peace" in William Schabas (ed.) Cambridge Companion to International Criminal Law, Cambridge, Cambridge University Press, 2016 ISBN 978-1-107-69568-9
- "Die amerikanische Besetzung Guantánamos", Institut für Rechtspolitik an der Universität Trier, Rechtspolitisches Forum Nr. 28, 2005, ISSN 1616-8828.
- "The United Nations and the Guarantees of a Fair Trial" in David Weisbrodt (ed.), The Right to a Fair Trial, Springer Berlin, Volume 129, 1997, ISBN 3-540-62593-3.
- "Ethnic Cleansing: Applicable Norms, Emerging Jurisprudence, Implementable Remedies" in John Carey (ed.) International Humanitarian Law: Origins, New York: Transnational Press, 2003, pp. 283–307, ISBN 978-1571052643.
- "The Follow-up Procedure of the UN Human Rights Committee" in International Commission of Jurists Review, no. 47, 1991. ISSN 0443-8094
- "Petitioning the United Nations" in American Society of International Law, Proceedings of the 9th annual Meeting, 2001, Washington DC
- "International Law and Mass Population Transfers" in Harvard International Law Journal, 16: 207–58. ISSN 0017-8063
- "The Illegal Implantation of Turkish Settlers in Occupied Northern Cyprus" in Gilbert Gornig (ed.), Iustitia et Pax, Berlin: Duncker & Humblot, 2008, pp. 721–31. ISBN 978-3-428-12745-0
- "Karl Ernst Smidt" in Biographisches Lexikon für Ostfriesland, Aurich, 2007. ISBN 3-932206-62-2
- "Der Krieg im ehemaligen Yugoslawien aus völkerrechtlicher Sicht" in Tilman Zülch (ed.) "Ethnische Säuberung-Völkermord", Hamburg: Luchterhand (1993). ISBN 3-630-71084-0.
- "Minority Rights in the New Millennium" in The Geneva Post Quarterly, May 2007, pp. 155–208. ISSN 1422-2248
- "Normes morales et normes juridiques. Concurrence ou conciliation" in Anne Sophie Millet-Devalle (ed.), Religions et Droit International Humanitaire, Paris: Editions Pedone, 2007, pp. 81–87. ISBN 978-2-233-00535-9
- "Der Nürnberger Prozess" in Alexander Demandt "Macht und Recht", Munich: C.H. Beck, 1996. ISBN 3 406 39282 2
- "The potential for US ratification and enforcement of the Covenants on Civil and Political Rights and Economic, Social and Cultural Rights". Georgia Journal of International and Comparative Law, vol. 20, 1990. pp. 299–310. ISSN 0046-578X
- "The Procedures and Case-Law of the United Nations Human Rights Committee" in Carlos Jiménez Piernas, The Legal Practice in International Law and European Community Law, Leiden: Martinus Nijhoff, 2007. ISBN 978-9004154261.
- "Desarrollo jurisprudencial del Comité de Derechos Humanos" in Carlos Jiménez Piernas, "Iniciación a la práctica en Derecho Internacional y Derecho comunitario europeo", Marcial Pons, Barcelona 2003, ISBN 84-9768-069-3
- "Reflections on Law and Justice" in Diva International Diplomat, N. 3, 2019, Geneva ISSN 1660-9913 pp. 26–27.
- "Ethnic Cleansing 1945 and Today: Observations on its Illegality and implications" in Steven Vardy (ed.), Ethnic Cleansing in 20th century Europe New York, Columbia University Press ISBN 0-88033-995-0
- "Selbstbestimmungsrecht und Vereinten Nationen" in Hans-Joachim Heintze (ed.) Selbstbestimmungsrecht der Völker Bonn, Dietz Verlag, 1997 ISBN 3-8012-0247-X
- "A historic survey of twentieth century expulsions" in Anna Bramwell (ed.) Refugees in the Age of Total War, Boston, Unwyn Hyman, 1988 ISBN 0-04-445194-6
- "The Ottoman genocide of the Greeks" in Tessa Hoffman (ed.)The Genocide of the Ottoman Greeks, New York, Caratzas, 2011 ISBN 978-0-89241-615-8
- "Le comité des droits de l'homme et le defi de Guantanamo" in Ben Aissa (ed.) Mélanges offeerts au Doyen Abdelfattah Amor Tunis, Centre de Publications Universitaires, 2005 ISBN 9973-37-282-4
- "La dérogation et le comité des droits de l'homme" in Daniel Premont (ed.)Droits Intangibles et Droits de l'Homme Bruxelles, Bruylant, 1996 ISBN 2-8027-0766-3
- "Les Arménians et le droit au recours" in Politique Internationale, Revue trimestrielle, No. 147, Paris ISSN 0221-2781
- "Préface" to the collection of poems by Camilo Pallasco and Françoise Mianda, Le jeu des mots. Poèmes Editions de la Maison Rouge, Cossonay ISBN 978-2-940410-36-1
- "Human rights and indefinite detention". International Review of the Red Cross. March 2016.

=== Journals ===
- — (1 December 1991). "The Follow-up Procedure of the UN Human Rights Committee" (PDF). International Commission of Jurists Review (47). International Commission of Jurists: 28–35. ISSN 0020-6393. LCCN 75009596. OCLC 605141439. Archived (PDF) from the original on 5 April 2016.
- — (1 June 1992). "The Wehrmacht bureau on war crimes". The Historical Journal. 35 (2). Cambridge University Press: 383–399. doi:10.1017/S0018246X00025851. eISSN 1469-5103. ISSN 0018-246X. LCCN 62052664. OCLC 301165981. S2CID 159986792.
- — (1 April 1993). "The Kalshoven Commission". Leiden Journal of International Law. 6 (1): 131–134. doi:10.1017/S0922156500001680. eISSN 1469-5103. ISSN 1478-9698. LCCN 2004252700. OCLC 916305492. S2CID 145179888.
- — (10 December 1995) [1995-09-01]. "The right to one's homeland, ethnic cleansing, and the International Criminal Tribunal for the Former Yugoslavia". Criminal Law Forum. 6 (2): 257–314. doi:10.1007/BF01097769. ISSN 1046-8374. LCCN 2007233703. OCLC 223314674. S2CID 144513680.
- — (1 September 1997). "Collective expulsions: Norms, Jurisprudence, remedies". Refugee Survey Quarterly. 16 (3): 149–153. doi:10.1093/rsq/16.3.149. ISSN 0253-1445. OCLC 244827927.
- — (1 August 2007). "The Istanbul Pogrom of 6–7 September 1955 in the Light of International Law". Genocide Studies and Prevention. 2 (2). University of Toronto Press: 137–154. doi:10.3138/gsp.2.2.137. eISSN 1911-0359. ISSN 1911-9933. OCLC 804391848.
- —; Martín, Áurea Roldán (7 December 2012). "Freedom of Opinion and Freedom of Expression: Some Reflections on General Comment No. 34 of the Un Human Rights Committee". Netherlands International Law Review. 59 (3): 425–454. doi:10.1017/S0165070X12000289. ISSN 0028-2138. OCLC 182898419. S2CID 147266476.
