= Franziska von Reitzenstein =

German novelist (1834–1896)

- Born: Franziska von Nyss; 19 September 1834; Castle Härdenstein, Swabia
- Died: 4 June 1896 (aged 61); Munich
- Spouse: Freiherr von Reitzenstein
- Writing career
- Pen name: Franz von Nemmersdorf
- Genres: novels, novellas

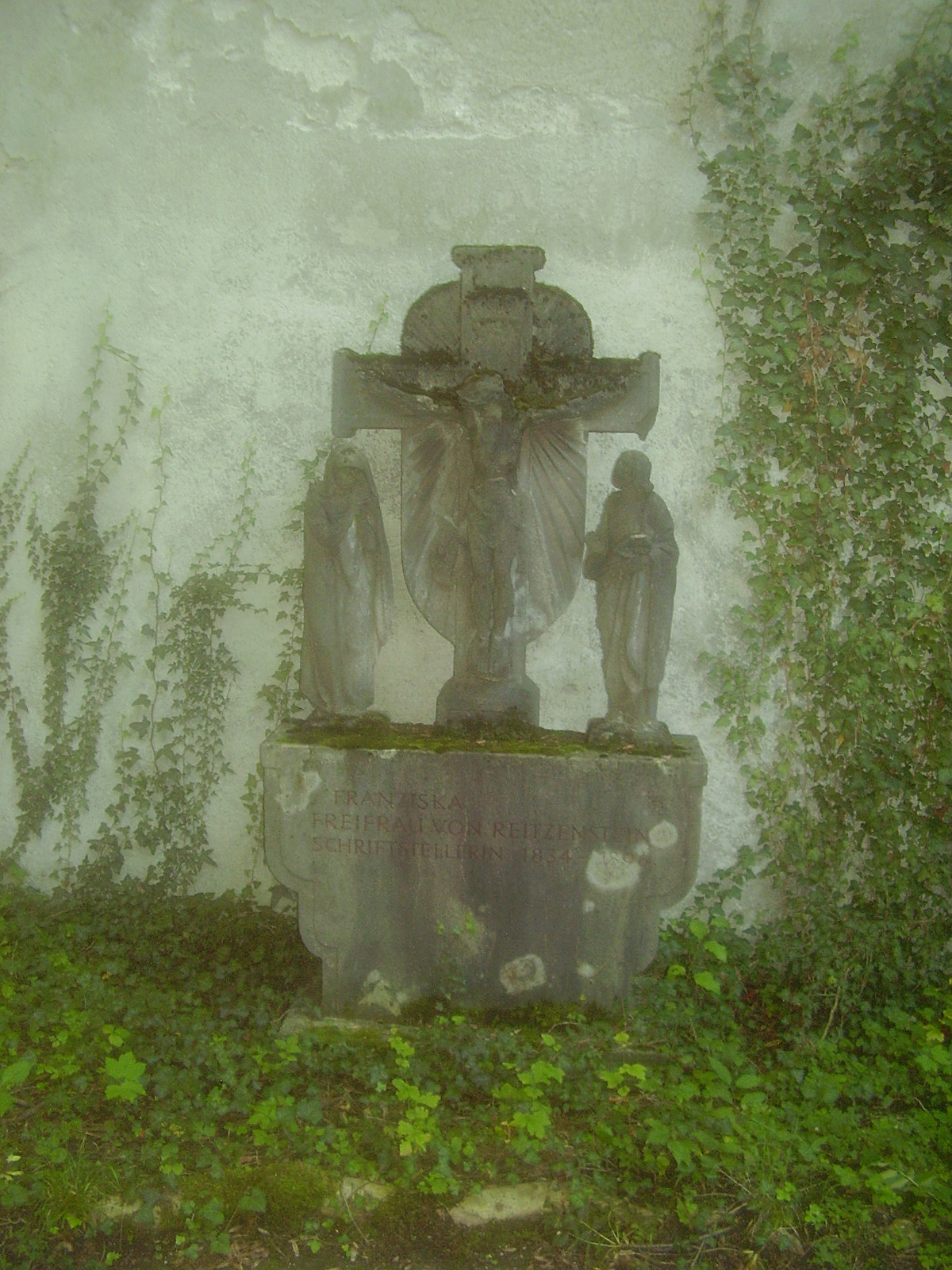
Grave of Franziska von Reitzenstein

Franziska Freifrau von Reitzenstein (née von Nyss; alias "Franz von Nemmersdorf"; 19 September 1834 – 4 June 1896) was a German novelist.

== Biography ==
Von Reitzenstein was born the daughter of a judicial counselor (Oberappellations-Gerichtsrat) in Castle Härdenstein in Swabia. She was well educated and moved in aristocratic and noble circles. In 1849 she married the royal Bavarian Rittmeister Freiherr von Reitzenstein. After her husband died in 1853, she travelled to several places of Italy and was inspired to write by Karl Gutzkow. She randomized her male pen name "Franz" in a topographical, statistical lexicon, whereas Nemmersdorf was the former name of a settlement in East Prussia, today Mayakovskoye.

Under her pen name she wrote novels in particular, also some with historical themes. Later she followed in Paolo Mantegazza's footsteps and dedicated her work Kampf der Geschlechter to him, which dealt with the relations between women and men and of the question of women's rights. She wrote also for journals and newspapers, amongst them the "Allgemeine Zeitung" in Augsburg, the "Münchener Zeitung" (literally: Munich's newspaper) as well as the appending "Unterhaltungsblatt" (entertainment paper), also Keil's „Die Gartenlaube“ and several papers in Vienna. Von Reitzenstein owned a house in Munich, where she lived with her cats, which was why she was called "cat baroness" by her neighbors She is buried in the Old Southern Cemetery in Munich. Her grave tomb was designed by Friedrich von Thiersch.

== Works ==
- Von der Newa an die Weichsel ("From the Neva to the Vistula"), in Unterhaltungen am häuslichen Herd published by Karl Gutzkow
- Unter den Ruinen ("Under the Ruins", a novel about Rome, 4 vol.), Leipzig, 1861,
- Moderne Gesellschaft ("Modern Society", novel, 4 vol.), Leipzig, 1863
- La Stella (Italian for the star, an anecdote), Munich, 1863, prior published in Neue Münchener Zeitung
- Doge und Papst ("Doge and Pope", a historical novel about the 17th century and about Pope Paul VI, 2 vol.), Breslau, 1865
- Gozzi’s Rache ("Revenge of Gozzi", novella), published in the evening paper of the Bayerische Zeitung, 1865
- Allein in der Welt ("Alone in the World", novel, 3 vol.), Berlin, 1868
- Ein moderner Werther ("A Modern Werther", novella)
- Späte Sühne ("Late Atonement") in Julius Grosse's and Franz Grandauer's revue "Propyläen", 1869
- Unter den Waffen ("Under Arms", novel, 3 vol.), Berlin, 1869, reprinted in 1872
- Ritter unserer Zeit ("Knights of our Time", 3 vol.), Nuremberg, 1873
- Die Verworfene und Reine ("The Corrupt and the Pure")
- Ein dämonisches Weib ("A Demonic Woman"), 1873
- Ein Gentleman (4 vol.), Jena, 1874
- Ein Ehestandsdrama ("A Matrimonial Drama", 4 vol.), Jena 1876
- Die Masken des Glückes ("The Masks of Luck"), Berlin, 1876
- Gebt Raum! ("Make Way!", 3 vol.), Dresden, 1880
- Das Rätsel des Lebens ("The Enigma of Life", novel, 2 vol.), Leipzig, 1894
- Der Kampf der Geschlechter - Eine Studie aus dem Leben und für das Leben ("The Battle of the Sexes - a Study from Life and for Life", Leipzig, 1891
- Aus gärender Zeit - Studie aus dem Leben ("An Age of Ferment"), Stuttgart, 1895
