= Wielbark, Warmian-Masurian Voivodeship =

Town in Poland

Wielbark
- Town
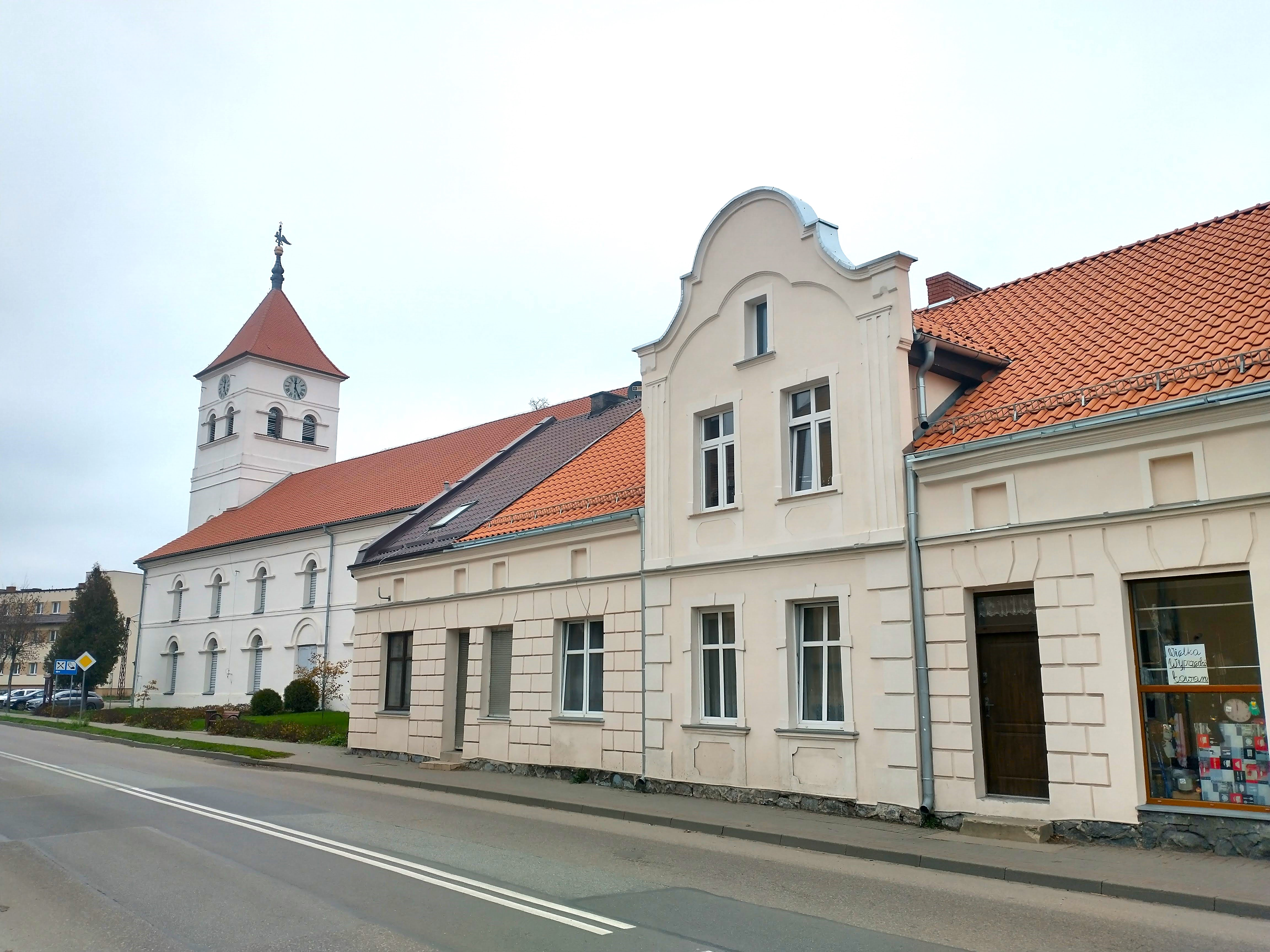
- Town center

- Flag Coat of arms

- Location within Poland
- Coordinates: 53°23′52″N 20°56′46″E
- Country: Poland
- Voivodeship: Warmian-Masurian
- County: Szczytno
- Gmina: Wielbark
- Established: 14th century
- Town rights: 1723

Area
  - Total: 1.84 km^{2} (0.71 sq mi)

Population
  - Total: 2,943
  - Density: 1,600/km^{2} (4,140/sq mi)
- Time zone: UTC+1 (CET)
  - Summer (DST): UTC+2 (CEST)
- Postal code: 12-160
- Area code: +48 89
- Car plates: NSZ

Wielbark [ˈvjɛlbark] (Note: German: Willenberg) is a town in Szczytno County, Warmian-Masurian Voivodeship, in northern Poland. It is the seat of the gmina (administrative district) called Gmina Wielbark. It is part of historic Masuria.

== History ==
=== Early history ===
The first named settlement mentioned in the area was called Bartniki. Bartniki along with the settlement located near castle, called Wieś Karczmarska, gave birth to Wielbark. The German name of the settlement, “Wildhaus” ("wild game house"), is first mentioned in 1361 of the Teutonic Order at the southern border of the Teutonic Order State Willenberg (Wildenberg) consisted only of a few buildings when it was founded by komtur Frederic von Willenberg. It developed as a trade settlement for local Polish beekeepers, hailing from nearby Mazovia (Masurians). The Old Polish word bartnik means "beekeeper".

In 1454 King Casimir IV Jagiellon incorporated the town and region to the Kingdom of Poland upon the request of the anti-Teutonic Prussian Confederation. In the Second Peace of Thorn (1466), the Teutonic Order regained authority over the town as a fief and part of the Kingdom of Poland. Later on, it became a part of Ducal Prussia with the adoption of the Lutheran faith by Albert of Prussia in 1525. A Protestant church was mentioned in 1557 and the settlement was called a small town in 1647. In 1656, throughout the Second Northern War, Wielbark, like many towns in Masuria, was destroyed by Crimean Tatars.

In the 18th century the town was a center of cloth manufacturing and benefited from its location at the main road from Warsaw to Königsberg. The settlement was granted town rights on 21 July 1723. Fires destroyed the town in 1743 and 1763. In 1745 town limits were expanded by including Warszawskie Przedmieście ("Warsaw suburb").

=== 19th century ===
In January 1807 70,000 Napoleonic soldiers traversed the town and had to be supplied. Napoleon headquartered here from 21 January to 2 February prior to the Battle of Eylau. The French troops caused a fire which damaged the town furthermore. In 1813 Tsar Alexander I of Russia received the official message of the Prussian accession to the struggle against Napoleon by General von Kleist at Willenberg.

The Prussian administration reform of 1818 made the town part of Landkreis Ortelsburg (Szczytno). On 23 September 1819 and on 9 June 1834 the town was again damaged by fire and in 1831 and 1852 cholera caused many casualties.

In 1823 a crisis happened when the authorities of Congress Poland in the Russian Partition of Poland introduced high custom tariffs on imports, reaching 60% to 80%, which brought large losses to the population in the town, mainly engaged in cloths trade. Despite this, the local fairs attracted large attendance of merchants from Masuria and the Russian-controlled Congress Poland, said to be the largest fairs at the time in Masuria. A new Protestant Church was built in 1827, based on plans of Karl Friedrich Schinkel.

The area played a role in Polish preparations for uprising against Russian Empire. Hoping to gain assistance from the population of Warmia, uprising plans from 1845 to 1846 hoped to establish seven main camps on border between Prussia and Russia, with one of them located near Willenberg, to which two Polish units, including one from Allenstein (Olsztyn) and one from Ortelsburg, would be directed, to attack Myszniec later on. During the January Uprising Polish units operated in the area, and in January 1864 a unit of Olszański-Ostrorog numbering 300 soldiers established a camp near the town. Local population itself engaged in smuggling of weapons to Polish resistance across the border.

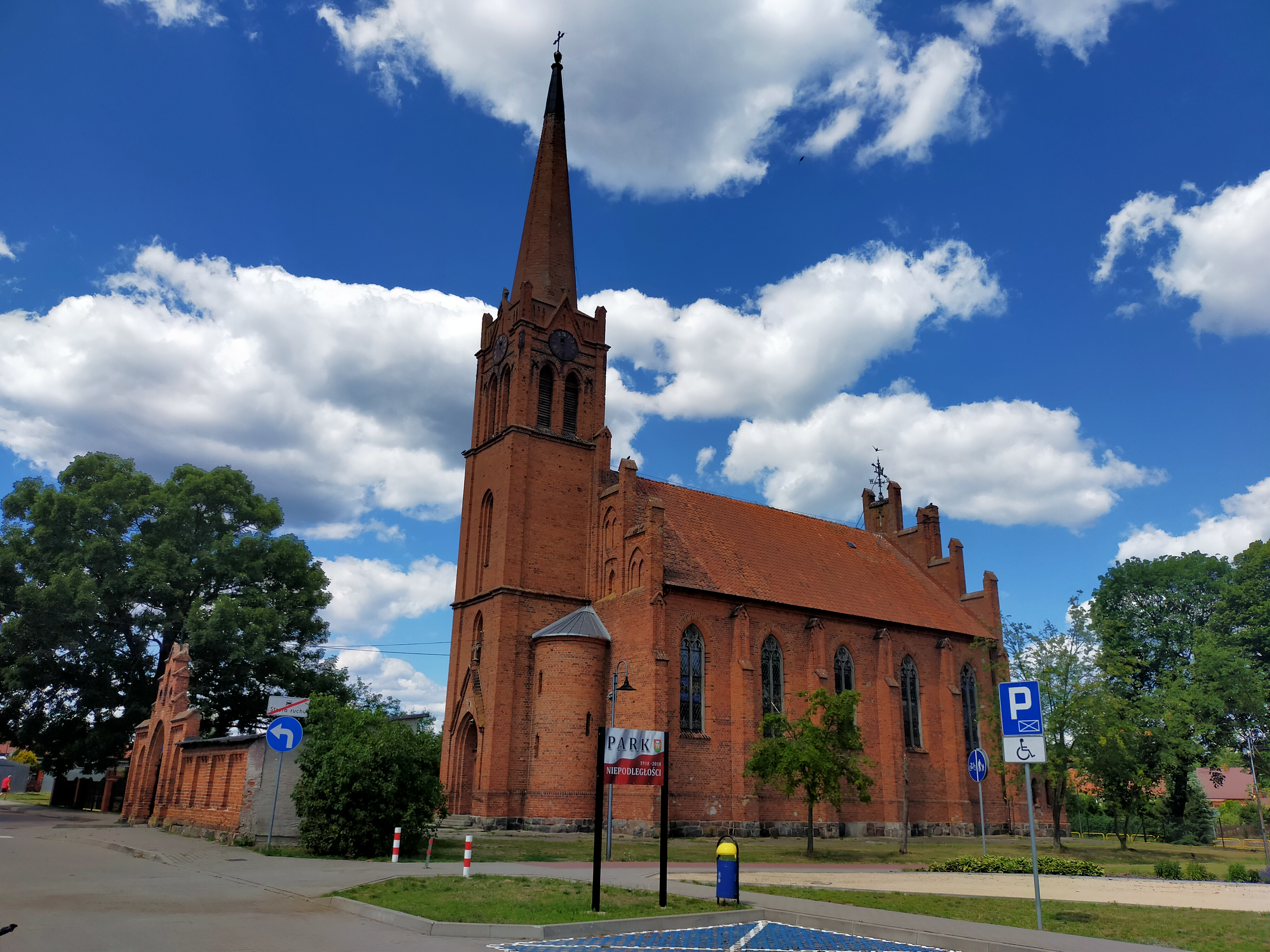
Saint John of Nepomuk church

In 1871 the town became part of the German Empire. In the years 1872-1887 the cleric in charge of the local parish was Polish priest Jan Szadowski - a religious and social activist, involved in defence of the Polish language. At that time the German Empire engaged in policy of Kulturkampf which combined anti-Catholicism with anti-Polish actions in areas inhabited by Poles. Thanks to his efforts a petition was made to Prussian authorities demanding that Polish language should remain in rural schools. He also initiated the construction of a local Catholic church and was engaged in popularizing Polish religious singing and wrote several collections of religious songs. Szadowski complained about the teaching system imposed on the Polish population "No child can read in Polish. The new teaching system strips poverty stricken Poles of their books for prayer and their beautiful songs". He also complained about expulsions of Poles by German authorities. During this time around 60 Poles were expelled by German authorities from the area of the town.

Szadowski's work in Willenberg was continued by Walenty Barczewski, priest, notable activist in the Polish national movement, author of numerous books about Warmia, its geography, history and folk culture, who arrived in Willenberg on 11 April 1889. Already in 1890 he managed to open up a Polish school in the town for young clerics. A Catholic church was built in 1878–1880. Wielbark was attached to the railway line Ortelsburg - Willenberg - Neidenburg (Nidzica) on 1 July 1900.

=== 20th century ===
In the beginning of World War I, Willenberg was occupied by Russian troops in the Battle of Tannenberg (1914). On August 30, 1914, 16,100 Russian soldiers were captured in a battle near Willenberg. The commander of the Russian Second Army, General Samsonov, committed suicide in a forest just south of Willenberg.

During the Polish-Soviet war, a plebiscite was organized to determine if the town should remain in Germany or be attached to Poland, which just regained independence. The Germans attacked and terrorized local Poles both before and after the plebiscite. On July 11, 1920, 1,581 citizens voted to remain in Weimar Germany’s East Prussia and 24 to join the Second Polish Republic in the East Prussian plebiscite. Afterwards posters were hung out in the town demanding that “traitors who voted for Poland” leave the town within three days with their belongings. Due to the Nazi Party's significant success in Masuria in the 1932 elections, Adolf Hitler visited the area in April 1932 and gave a speech in the town. In August 1939, Germany introduced martial law in the region, which allowed for increasing and blatant persecution of Poles.

At the beginning of World War II, in September 1939, German troops invaded Poland towards Mława and Warsaw from the area. The Polish resistance was active in the area. In 1944, Polish partisans seized German weapons in the vicinity of the town and blew up a German military transport on its way to Chorzele. In January 1945, the town was taken over by the Red Army from Nazi Germany. Due to the fast Soviet advance, large parts of the populace remained in the town or were overrun on their flight. After World War II, the remaining German populace was expelled and the town was transferred to Poland in accordance with the Potsdam Agreement. The historic Polish name Wielbark was confirmed as official by the Commission for the Determination of Place Names.

== Demographics ==
Historical population

Year	Pop.	±%
1782	1,100	—
1818	1,644	+49.5%
1857	2,044	+24.3%
1871	2,630	+28.7%

Year	Pop.	±%
1880	2,323	−11.7%
1900	2,280	−1.9%
1910	2,463	+8.0%
1925	2,441	−0.9%

Year	Pop.	±%
1933	2,507	+2.7%
1939	2,600	+3.7%
2008	2,943	+13.2%

== Sports ==
The local football club is Omulew Wielbark. It competes in the lower leagues.

== Notable people ==
- Bernhard Fisch (1926–2020), German writer
