= Ex Tempore (magazine) =

Literary magazine in Switzerland

Ex Tempore is a literary magazine published annually by the United Nations Society of Writers. The magazine was started in 1989, the same year as the society. There have been 36 issues, with the most recent in 2025.

The magazine publishes texts such as short stories, essays, poems, and plays in the six official languages of the United Nations: Arabic, Chinese, English, French, Russian and Spanish. Former Society of Writers president Alfred de Zayas continues to serve as the magazine's editor in chief.

== Reference numbers ==
ISSN 1020-6604, OCLC 34360356
