= The Wehrmacht War Crimes Bureau, 1939–1945 =

Book by Alfred-Maurice de Zayas

- First edition
- Author: Alfred-Maurice de Zayas
- Original title: Die Wehrmacht-Untersuchungsstelle
- Language: German
- Genre: Non-fiction
- Publisher: Universitas/Langen Müller
- Publication date: November 1979
- Publication place: Germany
- English publication date: 1989

The Wehrmacht War Crimes Bureau, 1939–1945 is a book by Alfred-Maurice de Zayas. It was published in November 1979 in Germany by Universitas/Langen Müller under the title Die Wehrmacht-Untersuchungsstelle, and in America in 1989 under the title The Wehrmacht War Crimes Bureau, 1939-1945 by the University of Nebraska Press. Professor Howard S. Levie, an expert in international humanitarian law, provided the preface for the American version. The book describes some of the work of the Wehrmacht War Crimes Bureau, a special section of the legal department of the Wehrmacht High Command, which collected reports of alleged Allied and German war crimes for purposes of diplomatic protests, war crimes trials, and white books.

== Research and authorship ==
The book examines the records of the work of the Wehrmacht War Crimes Bureau, a body set up to collect evidence of war crimes committed by both the Allies and the Wehrmacht in World War II. Examples include the murder of Ukrainians in Lviv by the NKVD in 1941, the murder of Polish prisoners of war at Katyn in 1940, executions of German prisoners of war by French irregulars in 1944, and the sinking of the German hospital ship Tübingen by the RAF in 1944. De Zayas was the first researcher to evaluate the extant 226 volumes; about half of the total records, the rest apparently having been burned in Langensalza, Germany, near the end of the war (de Zayas; pp. xiii-xiv). These records, captured by the United States Army in May 1945, had been classified documents in the United States for several decades, and had been returned by the US National Archives to the German Bundesarchiv in 1975.

De Zayas was head of a working group specialising in international humanitarian law, the "Arbeitsgruppe Kriegsvölkerrecht", at the Institute of International Law at the University of Göttingen. Together with a Dutch colleague from the University of Amsterdam, Walter Rabus, he undertook the evaluation of the recently declassified records, as well as related records of the Wehrmachtführungsstab, Fremde Heere Ost, and Kriegstagebücher (war diaries of army units). The project was financed by the University of Göttingen and by the Deutsche Forschungsgemeinschaft. Between 1975 and 1979, the project involved the interviews of hundreds of witnesses who had given testimony before the German military judges in 1939–45, and more than a hundred of the judges who had been involved in the investigations. Two international conferences were held to discuss the project, one at the Institute of International Law in Göttingen, and the other at the Institute of International Law at the University of Cologne. attended by international experts, the Director of the German Bundesarchiv, witnesses, and judges.

The result of the research was a 520-page book in German, consisting of two parts: a history of the bureau, its members, working methods, etc.; and a second part, consisting of case studies. It became the subject of a television documentary by the ARD/WDR in Germany, the broadcast receiving the largest number of viewers on 18 March and 21 March 1983. The 384-page English edition of the book was translated by de Zayas and published by the University of Nebraska Press in November 1989. De Zayas gave a series of guest lectures on the Wehrmacht War Crimes Bureau at universities in Germany, the Netherlands, and the United Kingdom, including the German Historical Institute in London.

The German version of the book was heavily criticised by the media of the Soviet Union and Eastern Europe. The book has remained in print for over 30 years and reached the 8th revised edition in Germany (Lindenbaum Verlag, 2012, ISBN 978-3-938176-39-9) and the 4th revised edition in the United States (with Picton Press in Rockland, Maine).

The Wehrmacht War Crimes Bureau, 1939-1945 is the first scholarly book on Allied war crimes (primarily Soviet) during World War II.

== Preface ==
In the Preface to the first German edition of the book, the Director of the Institute of International Law of the University of Göttingen, Dietrich Rauschning wrote about the close supervision of the project by the Deutsche Forschungsgemeinschaft and the experts of the five principal archives where the research was conducted, and about the distance and care taken by de Zayas and the members of his team in evaluating the records of the Wehrmacht-Untersuchungsstelle.

Howard Levie said in the preface: "The research for this book, which extended over a number of years, included the review of several hundred volumes of official records of the investigations of war crimes by the Wehrmacht War Crimes Bureau, the existence of which was hitherto unknown to researchers, the review of other original documents (including many in Russian, one of the author's several languages) and hundreds of interviews and correspondence with Germans who were involved in various capacities in the Bureau and in various aspects of those investigations by or on behalf of the Bureau during the course of World War II, as well as with witnesses to the events described ...It can be said without fear of contradiction that this book opens a new dimension in the study of the war crimes committed during World War II. It should generate much discussion and encourage other students of that period to further research, not only into the legal and historical, but also into the sociological and psychological aspects of this facet of that conflict."

== Aftermath ==
In the 1990s, the book became controversial in the context of a debate on war crimes committed by the Wehrmacht.

While the book mentions investigations of German war crimes in Poland, the Soviet Union and elsewhere, about half of the archival records of the Wehrmacht War Crimes Bureau are missing, according to de Zayas, and those extant files concern primarily Soviet war crimes.

In 2013 the best-selling British novelist Philip Kerr published a thriller under the title A Man Without Breath—unfolding before, during and after World War II, using real-life historical figures including the old Berlin judge Johannes Goldsche, head of the Wehrmacht War Crimes Bureau. Kerr notes at the end of the book: "The Wehrmacht War Crimes Bureau continued to exist until 1945. Anyone who wishes to know more about its work should consult the excellent book of the same name by Alfred M. de Zayas, published by the University of Nebraska Press in 1989."

== Reviews ==
In his review in the American Journal of International Law, Benjamin B. Ferencz, an American prosecutor at Nuremberg wrote:

Every victim of inhumanity, regardless of nationality, race or creed, should be entitled to the equal protection of the law. The stated primary purpose of this interesting and well-written work is to minimize the violations of international law in any future armed conflicts. If that goal is to be achieved, it is not enough merely to know that the rules are often broken by all sides. Americans learned that lesson at My Lai. There must be continued improvement in the codes in order to meet the changing modes of warfare. There must be inculcation and acceptance of humanitarian values, even in time of war. Most important, there must be a more certain, objective and effective judicial machinery, national and international, to improve the enforcement of international law and the rules of war. The de Zayas book sheds light on a problem that has not yet been resolved.

A review by Professor Christopher Greenwood in the Cambridge Law Journal notes:

This is an excellent book...all the cases examined have to be seen against the background of the Holocaust and the atrocities committed by the German armed forces and SS...nevertheless...atrocities do not excuse the kind of crimes detailed in this book.

Concerning the methodology of this book, Max E. Riedlsperger wrote:

"Dr. de Zayas first came upon the previously undiscovered 226 volumes of WUSt documents as a Fulbright fellow on leave from his studies in International Law at Harvard. After concluding his legal studies, de Zayas subsequently earned a PhD. in history and the University of Göttingen, where he later became an associate. The Institute supported the research on which this study is based and arranged for the assistance of a Dutch international law specialist, Dr. Walter Rabus...Mindful that the WUSt might have been manipulated by Goebbels's Propaganda Ministry, the authors were punctilious in their verification. They carefully examined the documents for internal consistency and continuity and then verified the reports and testimony, where possible, with judges, medical examiners and witnesses still alive. In addition, they compared WUSt documents with those of other German agencies in seven additional German archives, and with documents in British, Dutch, Swiss, and American archives. In this exhaustive analysis, it becomes clear that the WUSt operated with scrupulous objectivity and therefore that its documents constitute a valuable new source for the study of the conduct of war. This carefully documented administrative history together with its excellent bibliography will therefore become an important introduction to this extensive archive. The Wehrmacht-Untersuchungsstelle is at once an interesting history of an internal agency of the Third Reich and an important archival and historiographical contribution to the study of the war." German Studies Review, Vol. 4, No. 1 (Feb., 1981), pp. 150–151.

The book was positively reviewed in the German Press, including by Andreas Hillgruber in the Historische Zeitschrift, in the weekly DIE ZEIT and in the SPIEGEL.
