= Bernhard Fisch =

German writer (1926–2020)

- Born: 22 August 1926 Willenburg, Ortelsburg, East Prussia
- Died: November 18, 2020 (aged 94) Stadtroda, Germany
- Occupation: Non-fiction writer
- Subject: Nemmersdorf massacre

Bernhard Fisch (22 August 1926 – 18 November 2020) was a German writer.

== Life ==
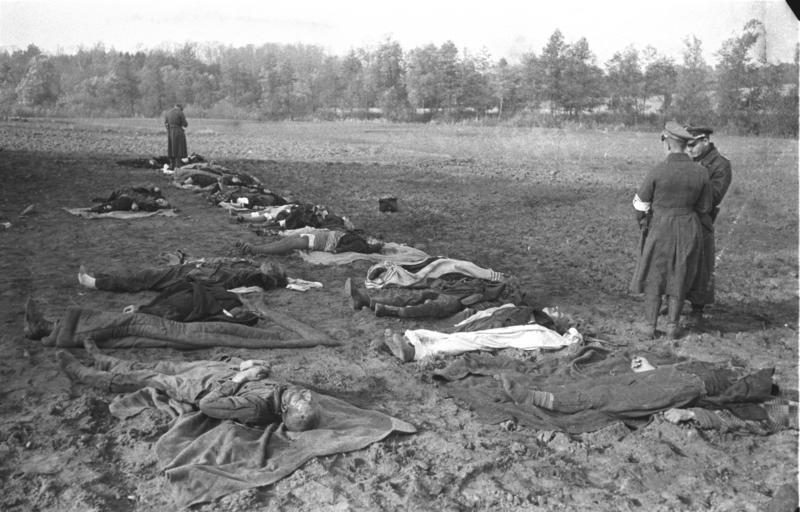
German victims of the Nemmersdorf massacre, Fisch's main topic of interest

Fisch was born in Willenberg, near Ortelsburg, East Prussia on 22 August 1926. He went to elementary school in his home town, and then visited the Realgymnasium in Ortelsburg. During the Second World War he was drafted to the Wehrmacht and fought in East Prussia and in Upper Bavaria. He was wounded and became prisoner of war.

In 1945, his family had to leave their home due to expulsion of Germans and wound up in Thuringia, which became part of the socialist German Democratic Republic (East Germany). At age 19, he went back to school to graduate (Abitur). He acquired a full-time job at the socialist party organisation for youths, Freie Deutsche Jugend, but lost it due to an infringement against cult of personality („Verstoß gegen den Personenkult“). He became a teacher at an Erweiterte Oberschule in Suhl until 1957. Having been married in 1950, he has a daughter and two grandchildren, who have been living since 1958 in Stadtroda. He studied pedagogy and slavic studies, graduated Ph. D. (Dr. paed.), published about methods of teaching foreign languages and was a scientific assistant for six years in Gera.

In the 1970s, he developed an interest in East Prussian history and the expulsions, both being considered taboo in the GDR. At a 2004 conference of communists in Thuringia, he presented a book of 1945, containing pictures of the East Prussian landscape, which had to be published without any geographic names, as these were banned by censors. There, he also stated that while spending 10 months at the Lomonosov Moscow State University, he flew via Kaunas to Königsberg/Kaliningrad, where he was arrested by the Russian police. During Die Wende of 1989/1990 in the GDR, Fisch founded an "organisation of resettlers of the GDR", using the old official wording, but this organisation merged into the West German Bund der Vertriebenen where he found no majority for his views.

In 1990, the year the GDR was dissolved in favor of German reunification, he retired. Taking advantage of his knowledge of the Russian language and former Soviet archives being opened at the time, he published about the expulsion of Germans, the role of Stalin in creation of the Oder-Neisse line, the anti-German propaganda of Ilja Ehrenburg, and mainly the Nemmersdorf massacre.

Fisch died in Stadtroda in November 2020 at the age of 94.

== Works ==
- Bernhard Fisch: Nemmersdorf 1944 – ein bisher unbekanntes zeitnahes Zeugnis. In: Zeitschrift für Ostmitteleuropa-Forschung Bd. 56 H. 1 (2007), S. 105–114 (online).
- Bernhard Fisch: Nemmersdorf 1944 – nach wie vor ungeklärt. S. 155–167. In: Orte des Grauens. Verbrechen im Zweiten Weltkrieg, Hrsg. Gerd R. Ueberschär, Primus-Verlag (online), Darmstadt 2003. (at gleich-lesen.de online; Rezension.)
- Bernhard Fisch: Was haben die Augenzeugen wirklich gesehen? Erfahrungsbericht über die Quellen zu den Ereignissen im ostpreußischen Nemmersdorf am 21. und 22. Oktober 1944. In: Bulletin für Faschismus- und Weltkriegsforschung H. 12 (1999), 30–65
- Bernhard Fisch: Ubej! Töte! Zur Rolle von Ilja Ehrenburgs Flugblättern in den Jahren 1944/45. In: Geschichte – Erziehung – Politik. Bd. 8 (1997), S. 22–27, 5 Abb.
- Bernhard Fisch: Nemmersdorf, Oktober 1944. Was in Ostpreußen tatsächlich geschah., Mit einem Nachw. von Ralph Giordano und einem Vorw. von Wolfgang Wünsche, edition ost, Verlag Das Neue Berlin (1997), ISBN 3-932180-26-7
- Bernhard Fisch: Stalin und die Oder-Neiße-Grenze, Helle Panke, Berlin 2000
- Bernhard Fisch: Die Striche des Josef W. Stalin. Vom Anteil der Kommunisten an der Vertreibung der Deutschen aus Ostmitteleuropa, trafo-Verlag, Berlin 2005, 449 S., ISBN 3-89626-218-1
