= Detlef Brandes =

German historian

Detlef Brandes (1 May 1941 – 2 September 2025) was a German historian who is known for his writings on the history of the Czech lands. He taught modern history at the Heinrich Heine University Düsseldorf and headed the Institute for the History and Culture of Germans in Eastern Europe there.
