= Patrick Sutter =

Patrick Sutter may refer to:

- Patrick Sutter (ice hockey)
- Patrick Sutter (footballer)
