= Anders Johnsson (jurist) =

Swedish jurist

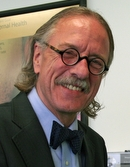
Anders Johnsson in 2009

Anders B. Johnsson (born 1948) is a Swedish jurist and a former Secretary General of the Inter-Parliamentary Union (IPU).

== Biography ==
Johnsson was born in Lund, Sweden. He holds a Bachelor of Law degree from Lund University, has studied European law and integration in Bruges, Belgium, and holds a Master of Comparative Law degree from New York University.

He worked for over 15 years at the Office of United Nations High Commissioner for Refugees (UNHCR) where he held senior positions in Honduras, Pakistan, Sudan and Viet Nam. He also served as Senior Legal Adviser to the High Commissioner at the UNHCR Headquarters.

Johnsson joined the IPU in 1991 where he directed the development of the IPU's program on strengthening parliaments and promoting democracy. He was Deputy Secretary General and Legal Adviser from 1994 to 1998 and Assistant Secretary General from 1991 to 1994.

He was elected IPU Secretary General in 1998 for an initial four year mandate and has since been re-elected three times. Johnsson is the IPU's seventh Secretary General from the organization's founding in 1889.

Johnsson's fields of expertise include international law and organisation, refugee law and human rights, and parliamentary diplomacy. He has authored several papers and articles on those matters.

On 28 July 2011 the Congress of the State of Chiapas, Mexico, bestowed the Medal "Fray Matías de Cordoba" to Anders B. Johnsson in recognition of his work to strengthen parliaments, human rights, gender equality, and the promotion of democracy. This was partly in recognition of the IPU conference held in Chiapas on 3 November 2010 on "Parliaments, Minorities and Indigenous Populations, towards effective political participation" which resulted in the "Chiapas declaration" on strengthening involvement of minorities in parliamentary politics.

Johnsson is married to a Mexican writer. They share three children.
