= UN Special =

Magazine

UN Special, the former magazine of international civil servants in Geneva, was founded in 1949 and circulated uninterruptedly until December 2019. As of 2020, the staff associations of the two organizations that co-owned the magazine went their separate ways, each with its own publication. The use of the United Nations name, logo and emblems are retained by UN Today exclusively, however the pool of writers of NewSpecial includes UN Staff members, diplomats, and others.

== History ==
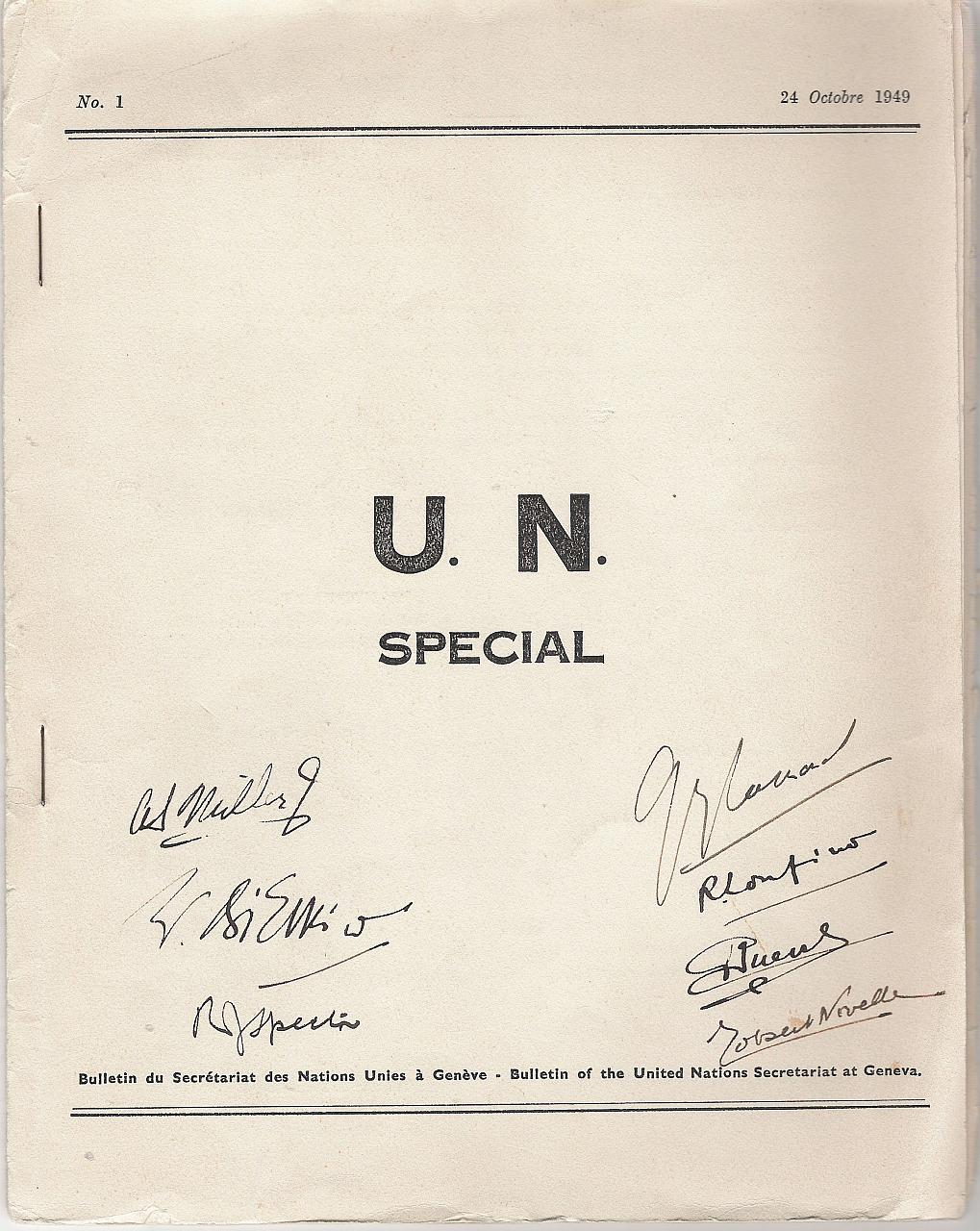
Cover of the first issue of the UN Special, 1949.

The first issue of UN Special was published on 24 October 1949. It was handwritten and the cover was signed by the members of the Editorial Committee at that time. Among the articles, essays and UN announcements in this first issue under the Chief Editor R.J Spencer, are a welcoming address by Wladimir Moderow, the representative of the Secretary-General, the Director-General of the European Office of the United Nations (the nation of the United Nations Office at Geneva in 1949) and by Gunnar Myrdal, Executive Secretary of the United Nations Economic Commission for Europe, UNECE. Another contribution was dedicated to the celebration of the United Nations Day, announcing the public reading of the Preamble of the UN Charter. This first issue contained 22 black and white pages without defined columns and without photos.

Over the years, UN Special became a professional 50 page-magazine with an average of 32 articles, mainly in English and French (the six official UN languages are English, French, Russian, Spanish, Arabic, and Chinese). Earlier, the content of the magazine tended to focus on UN staff issues, however, with its development and increase in outreach, the magazine covered a broad range of topics related to the work of international organizations and governance, such as peace-keeping, poverty reduction, human rights, climate change mitigation, environmental protection, natural disaster management, and the status of the Millennium Development Goals (MDGs). The recent global discussions on greening the economy and enhancing sustainable development were reflected in the magazine due to the engagement within these topics of those contributing to the UN Special. Cultural and environmental World Heritage Sites (listed by UNESCO), also found coverage in the magazine.

In October 2009, the exhibition "UN Special magazine: History over 60 years" was inaugurated in the Palais des Nations in Geneva. The exhibition traced the development of UN Special from the first magazine in 1949, and highlighted key moments in the history of the United Nations as experienced and told by staff. The exhibition was visited by the Secretary-General of the United Nations Ban Ki-moon. The Director-General of the United Nations Office at Geneva Sergei Ordzhonikidze in his opening remarks to mark the 60th anniversary of the UN Special magazine noted: "I believe that UN Special embodies both the United Nations’ unique ability to facilitate cooperation between people of all backgrounds and its capacity to adjust to ever-changing circumstances – without losing sight of the overall objectives".

In summer of 2015, UN Special submitted the nomination for the United Nations Secretary-General Awards (UNSG Awards) that honour individual staff members or teams who promote innovation, efficiency, and excellence in the way the Organization delivers its programmes and services. On the eve of the 70th anniversary of the United Nations, UN Special was shortlisted in the category: Staff Volunteerism, for the collective work of the colleagues who promoted Organizational values through the commitment of personal time and/or expertise to a deserving cause outside their job description.

== Achievements ==
=== UN Green Day ===
Green Day on the Place des Nations, 5 June 2010.

On 5 June 2010, the United Nations family invited the wider Geneva population to join in a big celebration of World Environment Day. A record number of 6,500 accepted the invitation to visit Ariana Park, which was also opened to mark the International Year of Biodiversity. Many activities were organized by the United Nations Environmental Programme (UNEP) on the Place des Nations, and the World Intellectual Property Organization (WIPO) opened its doors to the public for the first time. Based on an idea from UN Special magazine, and from its Editor-in-Chief, the event (also called UN Green Day) was made possible through the dedicated efforts over less than six months of an organizing committee, drawn from all UNOG Divisions and Services and working in collaboration with UNEP and WIPO colleagues. On the day, over 90 volunteers from different parts of the United Nations donated their time.

The event was also made possible through the contributions and assistance from the Swiss Confederation, the Canton and City of Geneva, the Permanent Missions of Brazil, Denmark, Italy, Japan and Rwanda and a large number of other partners. In addition to the opening of the Ariana Park, a multitude of activities for all ages, focused on biodiversity to mark the International Year of Biodiversity 2010, were held in the park, on the Place des Nations and at the World Intellectual Property Organization.

=== Memorial to honour those who lost their lives for peace ===
Memorial in Ariana Park

Special attention and tribute is given to United Nations staff and international civil servants who lost their lives under the duties of the United Nations in different parts of the world. A special Memorial has been inaugurated at the initiative of UN Special with the support of the United Nations Secretary-General and under the auspices of the United Nations Office at Geneva Director-General to commemorate those who lost their lives for the high ideals of the United Nations.(see UN Special No.600). The Memorial to honour those who lost their lives for peace was inaugurated at the grounds of the Palais des Nations, in Ariana Park, in 2003.

The Memorial in Ariana Park symbolizes all UN peacekeepers and a celebration of the International Day of the United Nations Peacekeepers takes place at the grounds of this Memorial to remember those who served in the UN peacekeeping operations and to honor the memory of those who died in the name of peace. Each year, at the end of May, UN staff and the Soldier for Peace International Association come to this Memorial to pay tribute to the women and men who serve, or have served, in United Nations peace missions across the globe, to salute their courage and commitment, their dedication and determination to serve fellow human beings in dangerous and difficult circumstances. Special ceremony is conducted near this Memorial in Ariana Park to honour more than 2,500 civilian and military personnel who have died in the line of duty since 1948. Near this Memorial UN colleagues vow to remember them, and pledge to carry on their efforts, to honour their memory and to ensure that their sacrifice will serve the cause of peace and stability in the world.

=== Rice is life ===
Rice is life was selected as the slogan for the International Year of Rice 2004. The slogan illustrated the significance of rice across the globe, and its importance to nutrition, livelihood, culture, and the natural environment. On the occasion of the International Year of Rice decreed by the United Nations General Assembly, the UN Special magazine, together with the United Nations family, the World Health Organization (WHO), and the Food and Agriculture Organization (FAO) prepared an international cookbook Rice Around the World. Rice nourishes more than 3 billion people throughout the world, and many cities and countries, from the richest to the poorest, have their own way of accommodating the various types of rice. The book was prepared by the international civil servants and people from throughout the world. The so called "Rice Team" from the UN Special Editorial Board collected and compiled 300 recipes from over 100 countries. The benefits were donated to the UNICEF to help fight hunger.

== Featured interviews ==
- Kofi Annan, former Secretary-General of the United Nations (http://www.unspecial.org/UNS600/UNS_600_T07.html)
- Navi Pillay, UN High Commissioner for Human Rights (http://www.unspecial.org/UNS679/t23.html)
- Sergei Ordzhonikidze, Director-General of the United Nations Office at Geneva (http://www.unspecial.org/UNS683/t21.html)
- Jimmy Wales, The founder of Wikimedia Foundation (http://www.unspecial.org/UNS694/t21.html)
- Jacques Rogge, President of the International Olympic Committee (http://www.unspecial.org/UNS696/t21.html)
- Sashi Tharoor, former Deputy General-Secretary of the United Nations (http://www.unspecial.org/UNS667/t3A.html)
- Dr. Margaret Chan, Director-General of the World Health Organization (http://www.unspecial.org/UNS684/t21.html)
- Gordon Martin, OBE, Honorable member of the Swiss Press Club (Club suisse de la presse) (http://www.unspecial.org/UNS666/t21.html)
- Abdou Diouf, La Francophonie International Organisation Secretary-General (http://www.unspecial.org/UNS667/t21.html)
- Anders B. Johnsson, Secretary-General of the Inter-Parliamentary Union (http://www.unspecial.org/UNS697/t21.html)
