= United Nations Society of Writers =

The United Nations Society of Writers is a club for United Nations staff registered with the United Nations Staff Socio Cultural Commission in Geneva, and is known under the acronyms UNSW and SENU, corresponding to Societé des écrivains des Nations Unies. It was founded in Geneva on Friday 14 August 1989 by Sergio Alberto Chaves (Argentina), Leonor Sampaio (Brazil) and Alfred de Zayas (United States, Switzerland).

== Overview ==
The UNSW organizes literary events, poetry readings, and round tables and publishes a yearly literary journal, Ex Tempore, with a print run of 500 copies. As of December 2024, thirty-five issues have appeared.

On 27 September 2019 the United Nations Library celebrated an event "Express and De-Stress" to commemorate 30 years of the UNSW and 30 years of publishing its literary journal Ex Tempore.

== Board ==
After 15 years as president of the UN Society of Writers, Alfred de Zayas retired in December 2005, but remains as editor of the literary journal. Following the General Assembly of UNSW held in Geneva on 18 February 2026, the composition of the new UNSW Board is

- President Josep Gari
- Vice-president: Monika Spyczak von Brzezinska
- Treasurer Carla Edelenbos
- Secretary Joel Hakizemana
- Editor-in-chief: Alfred de Zayas
- Honorary President: Tatiana Valovaya, Director-General of the United Nations Office at Geneva (UNOG)
