= Gozzi =

Gozzi is an Italian surname. Notable people with the surname include:

- Anders Gozzi (born 1967), Swedish professional ice hockey player
- Carlo Gozzi (1720–1806), Italian dramatist
- Gasparo Gozzi (1713–1786), Italian critic and dramatist
- Gaia Gozzi (born 1997), known as simply Gaia, Italian singer-songwriter
- Patricia Gozzi (born 1950), French actress
- Rasmus Gozzi (born 1993), Swedish artist
- Simone Gozzi (born 1986), Italian footballer
