= United Nations Independent Expert on the Promotion of a Democratic and Equitable International Order =

United Nations Independent Expert

Independent Expert on the Promotion of a Democratic and Equitable International Order of the United Nations
- Emblem of the United Nations
- Incumbent; George Katrougalos
- Term length: Three years
- Inaugural holder: Alfred-Maurice de Zayas
- Formation: UN Human Rights Council resolution 18/6 (29 September 2011)
- Website: ohchr.org

The United Nations Independent Expert on the Promotion of a Democratic and Equitable International Order is a United Nations Independent Expert (also known as Special Rapporteur) appointed by the United Nations Human Rights Council under its special procedures mechanism, to report on the thematic field of the promotion of a democratic and equitable international order. The mandate was established by Human Rights Council resolution 18/6 (29 September 2011), chiefly supported by developing countries.

== Purpose of the mandate ==
The aspirations of all peoples for an international order are based on the principles enshrined in the Charter.This includes promoting and encouraging respect for human rights and fundamental freedoms for all and respect for the principle of equal rights and self-determination of peoples, peace, democracy, justice, equality, the rule of law, pluralism, development, better standards of living and solidarity.

== Mandate holders ==
On 23 March 2012, Alfred-Maurice de Zayas (United States) was elected the Independent Expert by the Human Rights Council, after being nominated by its President Laura Dupuy Lasserre, the Permanent Representative of Uruguay. The other nominated candidates were Miloon Kothari (India), Vugar Mammadov (Azerbaijan) and Jean Ziegler (Switzerland). De Zayas presented his first report to the UN Human Rights Council at its 21st session in September 2012, calling for uniform application of international law. He presented his interim report to the General Assembly on 2 November 2012 and his next report to the council during the 24th session in September 2013.

The Current mandate holder is George Katrougalos (Greece), who assumed his duties pursuant to Human Rights Council resolution 54/4. Georges Katrougalos is a Greek academic specializing in public and constitutional law. He previously served as Minister of Foreign Affairs of Greece and is a professor at Democritus University of Thrace. He holds advanced degrees from Paris 1 Panthéon-Sorbonne University, with a focus on human rights and international law.

In his first report to the Human Rights Council pursuant to resolution 54/4, Independent Expert George Katrougalos outlined his vision for the mandate. Building on the work of his predecessors, Katrougalos aims to further strengthen the mandate by addressing the geopolitical gap in the development of a democratic international order.

The Independent Expert believes that the concept of democracy at the international level entails due respect for the independence and sovereign equality of states and their equal participation in global decision-making. He also noted that the report focuses on analyzing the challenges facing modern democracy, the shifting power dynamics between the North and South, and disagreements over values, as well as the impact of ineffective global governance institutions on the United Nations system.
