= Susana Raffalli =

Venezuelan nutritionist and activist (born 1964)

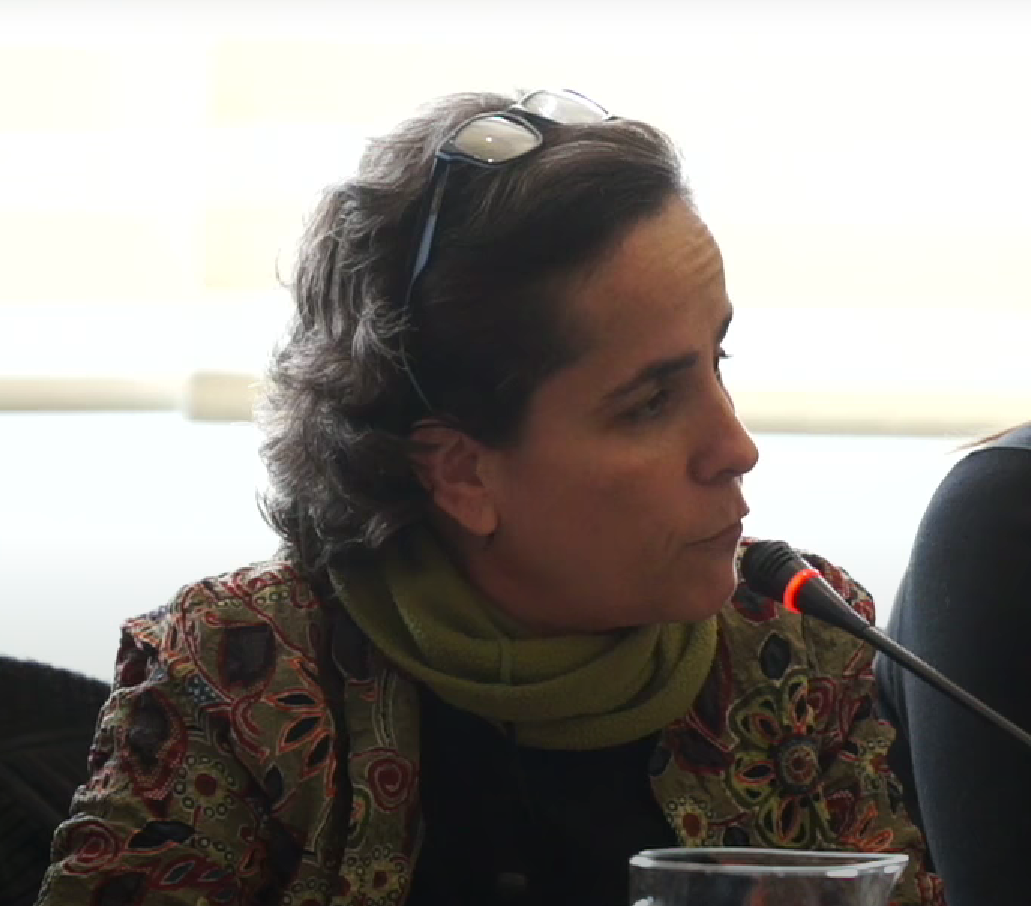
- Born: December 20, 1964 (age 61)
- Education: Central University of Venezuela
- Employer(s): UNICEF, Cáritas Venezuela
- Known for: humanitarian work in Venezuela

Susana Raffalli (born December 20, 1964) is a Venezuelan nutritionist and activist. She received a number of awards including the 100 Women (BBC) award in 2020 for her work in alleviating hunger in Venezuela and in particular during the coronavirus pandemic.

== Life ==
She studied at the Central University of Venezuela. She completed her master's degree in Guatemala under funding provided by the Caracas newspaper El Universal.

She was offered a job at UNICEF by Aaron Lechtig. His assistant was leaving so Raffali became the replacement. She was based in Bogota where they looked after Nutrition Affairs in Latin America for UNICEF. During her time there she learned about emergency nutrition as Hurricane Mitch devastated Guatemala, Honduras, Nicaragua, El Salvador and the Yucatán Peninsula in 1998.

She came to notice when she did the research and created a tool that revealed the detail behind the humanitarian crisis in Venezuela at the suggestion of Janeth Márquez of Cáritas Venezuela. The Nutrition and Health Monitoring, Alert and Attention System (SAMAN) is one of the few sources of intelligence on the emergency. Her data showed that just under one in three people living in Venezuela are going hungry in work published by the World Food Programme. Caritas began trying to get food brought into Venezuela to avoid widespread hunger in 2015 and it was still trying in 2019. Raffalli emphasises that shortage of food is bad for men, but for women the resource of last resort is their own bodies to keep their families fed.

She worked with others to provide centres where the under nourished could find food.

During the coronavirus pandemic of 2020 she helped to keep food supplies going for many including people with HIV, youths in prison and those with low incomes. She spoke out in November 2020 when the charity, Feed the Solidarity, was raided by the Venezuelan authorities. The charity which feeds the poor was accused of redirecting foreign money to subversive groups although no evidence was offered.

== Awards ==
In 2017, she received the National Human Rights Award from the Human Rights Coordinator of Venezuelan civil society and is recognised as one of the 10 women whose work stood out at the national level by the EfectoCocuyo communication portal. In 2018 Raffalli received the Franco-German Prize for Human Rights for her humanitarian work. In 2019 she is awarded for her public service with the Woodrow Wilson Awards. She was named as one on the BBC's 100 Women in 2020 for her inspiring work.
