= Nemesis at Potsdam =

1977 book

Nemesis at Potsdam: The Anglo-Americans and the Expulsion of the Germans
- First edition
- Author: Alfred-Maurice de Zayas
- Language: English
- Genre: Non-fiction
- Publisher: Routledge & Kegan Paul
- Publication date: 1977

Nemesis at Potsdam: The Anglo-Americans and the Expulsion of the Germans is a 1977 book by Cuban-born American lawyer Alfred-Maurice de Zayas. Its title is drawn from Greek mythology; Nemesis is the Greek goddess of revenge. The book implies that at the Potsdam Conference (held from 17 July to 2 August 1945) the victorious Allies of World War II took revenge on the Germans, resulting in significant territorial losses in Eastern Europe and the forced transfer of some 15 million Germans from their homelands in East Prussia, Pomerania, Silesia, East Brandenburg, Czechoslovakia, Hungary, and Yugoslavia.

The book is the first English language scholarly study of the expulsion of Germans after World War II, a topic that had received limited academic coverage in the English-speaking world at the time, and also in Germany and Austria, thus facilitating subsequent research in the subject by other scholars. The book was dedicated to Victor Gollancz, whose seminal book Our Threatened Values had inspired the author when he was a student at Harvard University. In Chapter 6 of the book, de Zayas cites Gollancz's clear condemnation of the expulsions:

If the conscience of mankind ever again becomes sensitive, these expulsions will be remembered to the undying shame of all who committed or connived at them. [...] The Germans were expelled, not just with an absence of over-nice consideration, but with the very maximum of brutality.

On the basis of US and British archival documents, de Zayas shows that the Western Allies were genuinely appalled at the manner in which the Germans were being expelled and that they lodged diplomatic protest notes in Warsaw and Prague – to no avail.

The theses of Nemesis at Potsdam have been condensed into a new 2012 book called 50 Theses on the Expulsion of the Germans from Central and Eastern Europe.

== Contents ==
- Chapter I. The Principle of Populations Transfers
- Chapter II. The Germans of Czechoslovakia
- Chapter III. The Genesis of the Oder-Neisse Line: The Conferences of Tehran and Yalta
- Chapter IV. The Flight: Prelude to the Expulsions
- Chapter V. Anglo-American Plan of Limited Transfers
- Chapter VI. "Orderly and Humane" Transfers
- Chapter VII. From Morgenthau-Plan to Marshall-Plan
- Chapter VIII. Peace without a Peace Treaty
- Chapter IX. Recognition or Revision of the Oder-Neisse Line
- Chapter X. Towards The Future: The Conference on Security and Co-operation in Europe—The Berlin question and détente—The German expellees today—Anglo-American attitudes

== Publishing history ==
The book was first published by Routledge & K. Paul in 1977 with the title Nemesis at Potsdam: the Anglo-Americans and the Expulsion of the Germans: Background, Execution, Consequences. It contained a preface by U.S. ambassador Robert Murphy, a participant at the Potsdam Conference and former political advisor of General Dwight D. Eisenhower during World War II and of General Lucius Clay during the American military government in Germany. Routledge published a second edition in 1979. The third edition, titled Nemesis at Potsdam: the Expulsion of the Germans from the East, was published in 1979 by the University of Nebraska Press. A subsequent edition was published by Picton Press in Rockland Maine.

The book is a revised version of a doctoral dissertation for the history faculty of the University of Göttingen in Germany. Although a scholarly book with 761 endnotes and 47 pages of bibliography citing archives, interviews and secondary sources, the book quickly became a bestseller. It received praise in the American Journal of International Law, the American Historical Review, Foreign Affairs, the Times Educational Supplement, and British Book News. However, some historians have criticized the book, contending that de Zayas had not given enough space to the Nazi crimes, that he relied too much on the stories of the German victims and their political representatives, that he is too legalistic in his analysis of the Potsdam Conference, and because of the tone of the moral outrage expressed by the author.

An enlarged German edition, with previously unpublished photographs from the United States Army Signal Corps, facsimiles of documents from the National Archives, Public Record Office, Federal Swiss Archives in Bern, and Bundesarchiv-Koblenz, was published in October 1977 by C. H. Beck in Munich, and had several editions, published under the title Die Nemesis von Potsdam. ISBN 3-7766-2454-X. The Herbig edition was positively reviewed in Die Presse and the Neue Zürcher Zeitung.

== Reviews ==
=== Academic ===
Reviews of the work include:

- Tony Howarth in the Times Educational Supplement: "His is a lucid, scholarly and compassionate study. Most pertinently he insists that we deny what the lesser histories conspire with us to invent—that there are stopping places in history." 22 April 1977, p. 495.
- Benjamin Ferencz in the American Journal of International Law: "The author, effectively using maps and photographs, traces the history of the expellees. Aided by Marshall Plan funds the millions of displaced persons, still longing for their homelands, recognized the futility of resort to force and turned to hard work to rebuild their lives by absorption in a democratic and peaceful society. The Helsinki Conference of 1975 in effect acknowledged that the provisional Oder-Neisse demarcation line implied de facto annexation. The lesson from this well organized and moving historical record is not merely that retribution which penalizes innocent human beings becomes injustice, but that acceptance of political realities may be a better road to human fulfillment than the path of violence Alfred de Zayas has written a persuasive commentary on the suffering which becomes inevitable when humanitarianism is subordinated to nationalism."
- A. K. Damodaran in International Studies: "An excellent piece of historical research. However, it would have been better if the author could enlarge the scope of the research by connecting the expulsion of the Germans... with the story of the expulsion and the genocide ordered by the Nazi regime."
- Alfred Connor Bowman in the American Bar Association Journal: "de Zayas... finds it easy to exculpate from war guilt all Germans, except Hitler and his immediate entourage, and [his] heart seems to bleed more for the displaced "simple German farmer" of the Sudetenland than even for the exterminated Jew. This is not said critically; it is a healthy experience to be exposed occasionally to a point of view and value system that at first blush seems outrageously untenable but with further thought becomes understandable if still unacceptable... There are technical flaws:[but] the writing is generally workmanlike, and the research seems to have been adequate, making allowance for the pervasive pro-German bias, which may have been injected deliberately to stimulate reactive reader interest. In any event, especially for lawyers with a historical bent, it will be rewarding reading."
- Frederick Dumin, Washington State University, in German Studies Review: " The material Mr. de Zayas presents is not new, though he correctly states that the facts of the German expulsion were never adequately publicized in the West... The author's approach cannot properly be considered revisionist, since he does not introduce new evidence or revise earlier interpretations, though he effectively synthesizes available sources to show how Czechoslovakia and Poland, with Soviet support, conducted illegal, and certainly inhumane, expulsions, and Poland, equally illegal territorial annexations... Certain mistakes and nuances, however, should have been avoided,... The author's claim that "Only a frivolous person would today fail to experience a certain visceral discomfort with those decisions" to leave the Sudetenland with Czechoslovakia, does ignore the realities of 1919 and is an attempt to rewrite, not understand, history. The author describes the Soviet invasion of East Prussia as having been of "genocidal character." Unfortunately the term "genocide" has been employed rather carelessly recently. Soviet behavior in East Prussia and elsewhere, as well as Germany's behavior towards the Russians, was brutal, bestial, inhumane. but not "genocidal." When read carefully, this book will be of considerable value to students, interested laymen, and general historians."
- James H. Wolfe in Southern Review: "Beginning with an historical overview of population transfers, the author examines in detail the diplomatic environment of World War II in which the decisions to alter frontiers and transplant populations were made. The Potsdam Conference occupies a key position in his analysis, since on this occasion the United States and Great Britain sanctioned the expulsions. Turning to the study of the human consequences of these forced migrations, de Zayas has frequently relied on interviews, such as that with Robert Murphy, the wartime political adviser of General Eisenhower, and on previously untapped archival resources. The fresh insights of the chapters on Allied military governance and the division of Germany in the immediate postwar period make this work essential reading for students of European international relations."
- Carl G. Anthon in the American Historical Review (reviewing the German version, Die Anglo-Amerikaner und die Vertreibung der Deutschen): "De Zayas writes with sympathy for the refugees and moral indignation over what he, as an international lawyer, concludes was another crime against humanity, but he strives to show how Allied decisions regarding postwar Germany were the product of many factors, such as horror over Nazi atrocities, the passions of war and victory, and considerable ignorance on the part of Anglo-American leaders regarding the actual state of affairs in Central and Eastern Europe".
- Juergen Doerr in Dalhousie Review: "De Zayas does not ignore the enormity of the crimes committed by Germans during the course of the war, nor does he deny that an anti-German feeling was natural and that punishment was justified, He does, however, question whether one set of crimes justified a second... whether revenge ... was not only extended to the guilty but to the innocent, whether expulsion itself was a crime ...While critical of western leadership, de Zayas leaves no doubt about the agents of the crime—the Soviet leaders. The recent works of A. Solzhenitsyn and Lev Kopelev give further credence to the thesis that Soviet retributive actions were often not spontaneous but were planned ...Praised must be de Zayas's reopening of this largely neglected aspect of modern German history through this brief but well-written account."
- Henry Lane Hull in the Ukrainian Quarterly, Vol. XXXVII, No. 2, p. 181 : "The basic thrust of Professor de Zayas' analysis centers on the ineptitude of the Allied leaders before the demands of Marshal Stalin and his successors. As the late Robert Murphy noted in the Foreword, Stalin's unsympathetic disregard of the rights of the individual Germans affected by population transfers is understandable in the context of Soviet hatred of the Nazi war machine. What is not understandable, however, is why Britain and the United States failed to see the injustice visited upon millions .... the bibliography is excellent and four folios of photographs graphically supplement the text. Substantially, organizationally and stylistically, this book is an outstanding historiographical achievement".
- LaVern Rippley in Die Unterrichtspraxis Vol. 11, No. 2, 1978, pp. 132–13: "Profusely illustrated with photographs, documents and excellent maps, this book analyzes the origin and the effects of article XIII of the Potsdam Protocol which provided that ethnic Germans living in the eastern countries would be transferred to the truncated remains of the Reich 'in an orderly and humane manner'. As the 16 million Germans were driven westward, some two million died, but the world remained silent. Outraged by the crimes Nazis had perpetrated ...the whole world, with a few exceptions, like Bertrand Russell and Albert Schweizer, remained mum.... de Zayas is perhaps best when delineating the legal aspects of the Potsdam action, although his historical facts are equally impeccable....Due to the willingness of the press and the scholarly community in the West to ignore these facts of the Potsdam accord, few Americans or Britons know there ever was an expulsion, let alone authorization of the compulsory transfer. Questioning rhetorically whether the wrong could ever be righted, de Zayas maintains that the West could affirm its regard for individual guilt or innocence and reject the concept of collective guilt."
- Craig Whitney in the New York Times, 13 February 1977, and in the International Herald Tribune 17 February 1977 : "A young legal scholar from New York, Alfred de Zayas, has written a book on a subject long taboo and ignored by German writers —the brutal expulsion of 16 million Germans from their homelands in Central and Eastern Europe after the Red Army moved in... Mr. de Zayas, who is 29 years old and has a fellowship at the University of Göttingen emphasized: 'I am not revisionist. It's just that I had taken a number of courses in history at Fordham and Harvard Law School, and this was just never mentioned. I don't think people outside Germany know much about it.' Truman, Churchill and Stalin agreed at Potsdam in 1945 that the German populations of Eastern Europe should undergo 'transfer to Germany' but 'in an orderly and humane manner'. The de Zayas book makes clear that the last provision was not fulfilled."
- Christoph Kimmich in Foreign Affairs: "An account of British and American acquiescence in the brutal expulsion of millions of Germans from their homes in East-Central Europe at the end of World War II. The author is a lawyer, not an historian, and he makes much of the legal (and moral) implications of the issue while understating its historical complexities."
- David Steeds in British Book News: "Mr. de Zayas... is surely right to dwell on their miseries and on the double standards of the victors. Some of them, after all, professed to believe in the principles of the Atlantic Charter. The book should cause argument and controversy; it deserves a wide readership."
- David Mutch in the Christian Science Monitor, 25 March 1977, p. 17 : "Mr. de Zayas is a lawyer, and is clearly opposed to mass population transfers on moral, legal and historical grounds...He argues that overreaction to the evils of the Nazis led to the principle of collective German guilt, a theory that does not protect the innocent and which ruled the thoughts and actions of many responsible British and American officials when they agreed to the expulsion demands of Stalin. Only later did they realize the inherent inhumanity of the results of their lack of perception...his short but heavily documented book (with 40 pages of notes, a long bibliography, interviews with persons involved, and a long research into unpublished U.S., British and German Documents) fills a gap."
- Norman Lederer in Worldview July/August 1978, pp. 54–55 : "De Zayas painstakingly details the manner in which Eastern European émigré governments during World War II prepared the way for Allied approval of the mass expulsion of Germans following the conflict. Their distortions of fact had a decided effect on the thinking of many Western leaders. Ironically, it was Winston Churchill, the nemesis depicted in Goebbels' propaganda to the German people, who foresaw most clearly the immense human tragedy that would result from the mass expulsions and who tried to curb the Eastern European countries' desire for territorial expansion at the expense of the German state. The Russian invasion of East Prussia aided the Eastern European leaders in getting their way. Hundreds of thousands of German civilians hurried west before the terrifying apparition of the shockingly undisciplined soviet army. Eastern leaders stated that this exodus had cleared out all the Germans, conveniently ignoring the fact that millions remained. These millions were abruptly ousted once formal conflict had ended ... [The book] is an important work on an enormously important but little known aspect of World War II."
- William Guttmann in The Observer: "The author traces the genesis of the relevant territorial arrangements and ensuing population transfers and then gives a well-documented and horrifying account of the exodus, the sufferings and deaths of millions, the ruthlessness of the new masters—a travesty of the 'orderly and humane' fashion in which the measures were supposed to be carried out."

== References to the work ==
- In his 2007 book After the Reich, Giles MacDonough (John Murray Publishers, London 2007. pp. 126, 556, etc.) notes: "There is a similar lack of documentation in English on events in Czechoslovakia. The best remains Alfred M. de Zayas's Nemesis at Potsdam (London 1979)," p. 585.
- In an article published by the Deutsche Welle on 16 August 2007 "Many Descendents of Expellees Reject Traditional Point of View", Trinity Harman reported that de Zayas "wrote the first scholarly work on German expellees to appear in English, breaking what had long been a taboo topic.The post-war expulsions were the largest forced movement of Europeans in the 20th century. Historians estimate that between 12 and 15 million people were expelled during the forced migrations."
- Robert Bard relies heavily on Nemesis at Potsdam in his doctoral dissertation Historical Memory of the expulsion of the ethnic Germans 1944–1947, University of Hertfordshire, July 2009
- The Institut für Zeitgeschichte (Institute of Contemporary History) held a symposium Potsdamer Konferenz - 60 Jahre danach with the participation of de Zayas as well as Guido Knopp, Soutou (Sorbonne), Anthony Nicholls (Oxford), on 19 July 2005 in Berlin

== Sources ==
- Gollancz, Victor (1946). Our Threatened Values. London: Victor Gollancz. LCCN 46006732. OCLC 1435602537.
- Lohne, Raymond (2012). 50 Theses on the Expulsion of the Germans from Central and Eastern Europe. London: Verlag Inspiration. ISBN 978-3-9812110-4-7.
