= Mayakovskoye =

Mayakovskoye Маяко́вское
- Rural locality
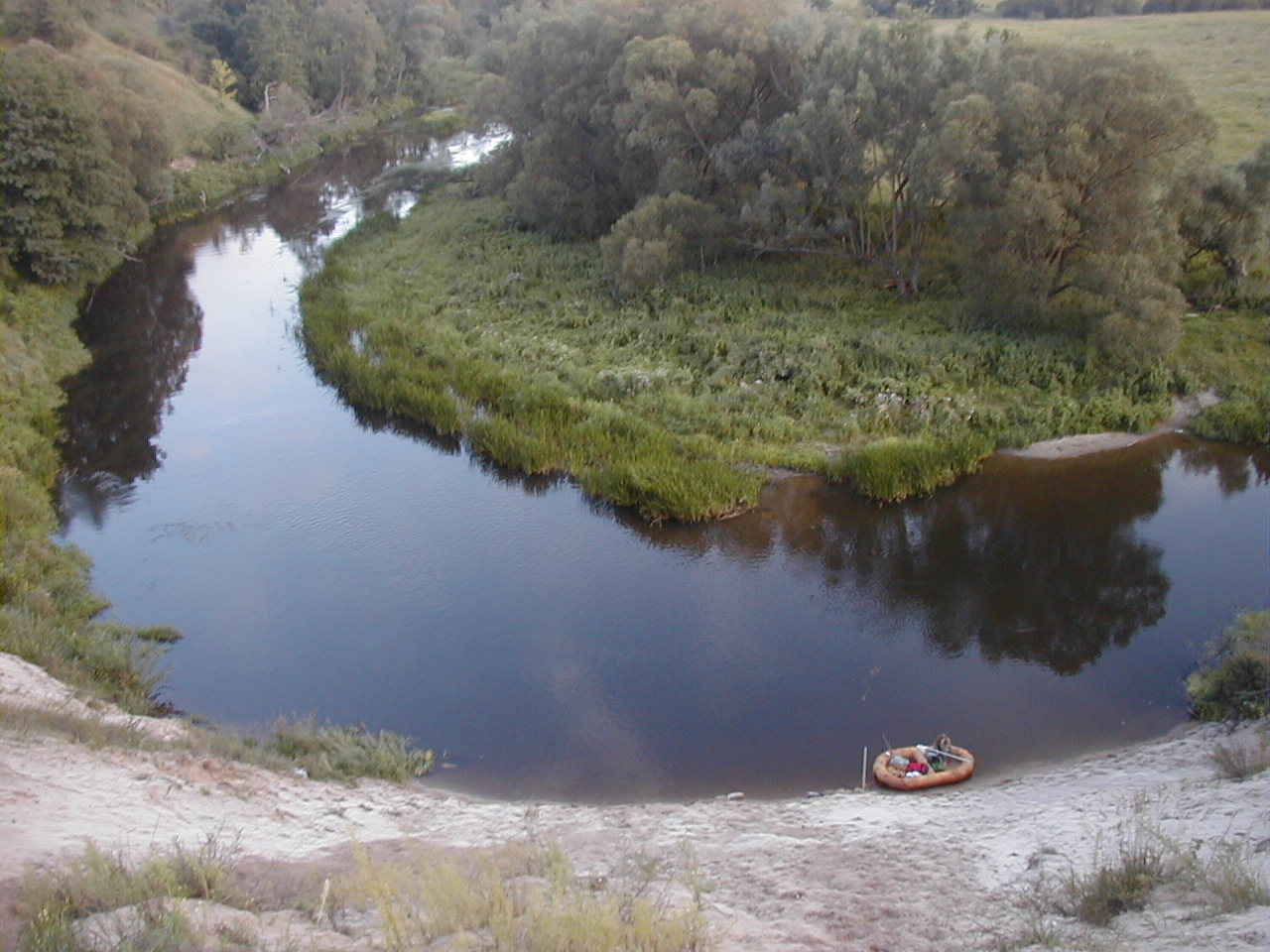
- The Angrapa River in Mayakovskoye
- Interactive map of Mayakovskoye
- Location of Mayakovskoye Mayakovskoye (European Russia) Mayakovskoye (Russia)
- Coordinates: 54°31′12″N 22°03′56″E
- Country: Russia
- Federal subject: Kaliningrad Oblast
- Administrative district: Gusevsky District
- First mentioned: 1515
- Elevation: 60 m (200 ft)

Population (2010 Census)
  - Total: 913
  - Estimate (2010): 913 (0%)
- Time zone: UTC+2 (MSK–1)
- Postal code: 238033
- OKTMO ID: 27709000231

Mayakovskoye (Russian: Маяко́вское; German: Nemmersdorf; Lithuanian: Nemirkiemis) is a rural locality (a settlement) in Gusevsky District of Kaliningrad Oblast, Russia, located on the banks of the Angrapa River. It lies approximately 11 kilometres (7 mi) south-west of Gusev.

The village became known during World War II on October 22, 1944, as the site of the first Soviet war crime on German territory against German women, French and Belgian POWs—the Nemmersdorf massacre.

== History ==
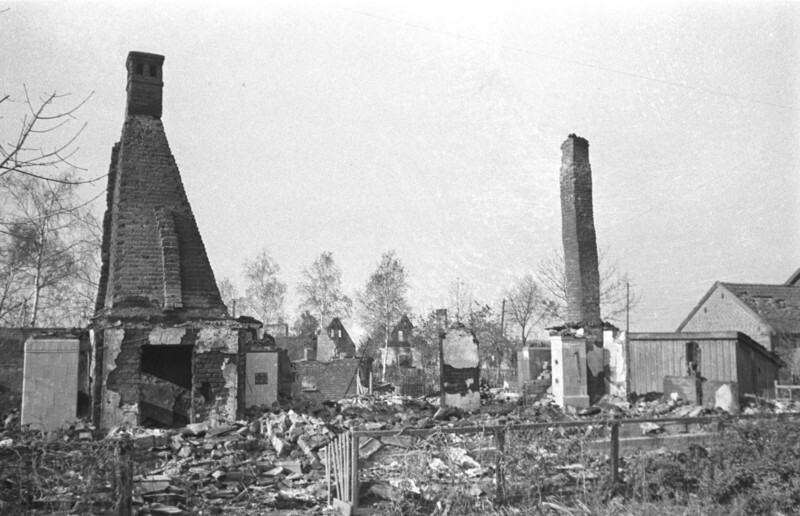
Destruction during World War II in 1944

The first documented mention of Nemmersdorf was in 1515 in a decree of the Insterburg Central Office. At that time, it was part of the Kingdom of Poland as a fief held by the Teutonic Order, and from 1525 held by Ducal Prussia. A prehistoric cemetery was located near the village. Lithuanian church services were held at the local church. From the 18th century it was part of the Kingdom of Prussia, and from 1871 to 1945 it was also part of Germany. In 1878, the population was predominantly employed in agriculture and cattle and horse breeding. Between 1874 and 1945, Nemmersdorf was the principal urban locality in Gumbinnen administrative district within the county of Nemmersdorf-Gumbinnen in East Prussia. The municipality included thirteen rural communities.

On October 22, 1944, Nemmersdorf was the scene of a massacre perpetrated by the Soviet soldiers against German civilians and French and Belgian noncombatants. Determining the facts has aroused controversy.

Following World War II, Nemmersdorf came under the Soviet administration and was given its present name in 1946. The German population who survived the massacre either fled or were formally expelled in accordance to the Potsdam Agreement.

== Demographics ==
Historical population
| Year | Pop. | ±% |
|---|---|---|
| 1878 | 479 | — |
| 1910 | 484 | +1.0% |
| 1939 | 637 | +31.6% |
| 2010 | 913 | +43.3% |
| 2021 | 808 | −11.5% |

Distribution of the population by ethnicity according to the 2021 census:

| | percent |
| Russians | 78.22% |
| Poles | 4.33% |
| Armenians | 2.60% |
| Belarusians | 1.11% |
| Kazakhs | 0.25% |
| refused answer or no data | 3.22% |

== Religion ==
The Nemmersdorf stone church was constructed on the orders of Albert, Duke of Prussia, but it was completed after his death, in 1589. It was a simple rectangular bay near the Angrapa River, with sacristy facing east. In 1769, the church was renovated with an altar from the workshop of Isaac of Riga.

Despite the damage in 1944, the church has survived two world wars. The nave has been preserved, now with a flat ceiling, but the tower is missing. After 1945, the church was used for other purposes and as a business building. In the early 1960s, it was rebuilt and now serves as a cultural center and library.

Until 1945, Nemmersdorf was predominantly Protestant with thirty Protestant clergy. During the Soviet period, church life was discouraged. Only in the 1990s was the new Kaliningrad Oblast Evangelical Church established. The Parish belongs to the Provost's Kaliningrad Evangelical Lutheran Church in European Russia.

== Sources ==
- Brandenburg, Christel Weiss and Dan Laing. Ruined by the Reich: Memoir of an East Prussian Family, 1916-1945. McFarland & Company. ISBN 0-7864-1615-7
- Dönhoff, Marion. Namen die keiner mehr nennt. Munich: Deutscher Taschenbücher Verlag, 1962.
- Fisch, Bernhard. Nemmersdorf, Oktober 1944: Was in Ostpreußen tatsächlich geschah. Berlin: 1997. ISBN 3-932180-26-7
- Samuel, Wolfgang. "War on the Ground", in The War of Our Childhood: Memories of World War II, University Press of Mississippi. ISBN 1-57806-482-1
- Thorwald, Jürgen.Wielka ucieczka (Große Flucht). Kraków: Wydawnictwo Literackie, 1998. ISBN 83-08-02890-X
