= Forced labor of Germans after World War II =

Post-war punishment of Germany

Memorial at the border transit and release camp Moschendorf (1945–1957). The inscription states it was the door to freedom for hundreds of thousands of prisoners of war, civilian prisoners, and expellees.

In the years following World War II, large numbers of German civilians and captured soldiers were forced into labor by the Allied forces. The topic of using Germans as forced labor for reparations was first broached at the Tehran Conference in 1943, where Soviet leader Joseph Stalin demanded 4,000,000 German workers.

Forced labor was also included in the final protocol of the Yalta Conference in January 1945, where it was assented to by UK Prime Minister Winston Churchill and US President Franklin D. Roosevelt.

== Eastern Europe ==
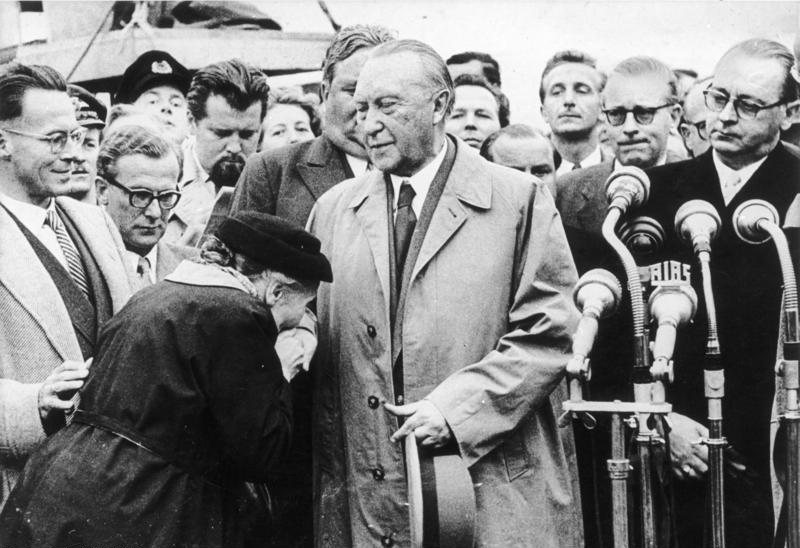
The mother of a prisoner thanks Konrad Adenauer upon his return from Moscow, September 14, 1955. Adenauer had succeeded in concluding negotiations about the release to Germany, by the end of the year, of 15,000 German civilians and prisoners of war, more than a decade after the war with Germany had ended on May 8, 1945.

=== Soviet Union ===
The largest group of forced laborers in the Soviet Union consisted of several million German prisoners of war (POWs). Most German POW survivors of the forced labor camps in the Soviet Union were released in 1953.

Estimates of German POW casualties (in both East and West and cumulative for both the war and peacetime period) range from 600,000 to 1,000,000. According to the section of the German Red Cross dealing with tracing the captives, the ultimate fate of 1,300,000 German POWs in Allied custody is still unknown; they are still officially listed as missing.

The capture and transfer of civilian ethnic Germans to the Soviet Union began as soon as countries with a German minority began to be overrun in 1944. Large numbers of civilians were taken from countries such as Romania, Yugoslavia, and from the eastern parts of Germany itself. For example, after Christmas 1944 between 27,000 and 30,000 ethnic Germans (aged 18–40) were sent to the Soviet Union from Yugoslavia. Women made up 90% of the group. Most were sent to labor camps in the Donbas (Donets or Donez basin) where 16% of them died.

=== Poland ===
In its shifted borders, post-war Poland comprised large territories that had a German-speaking majority and had been part of German states for centuries. Many ethnic Germans living in these areas were, prior to their expulsion from their home region, used for years as forced laborers in labor camps such as that run by Salomon Morel.

Among these camps were Central Labor Camp Jaworzno, Central Labor Camp Potulice, Łambinowice, Zgoda labor camp and others. The law authorizing forced labor, Article 20 of the law on the exclusion of the enemy elements from society, also removed rights to Polish citizenship and all property owned.

The many camps were used during the process of the expulsions for the sake of "rehabilitating" Reichs- or Volksdeutsche, to decide if they could stay or go, but in reality this was a program of slave labor.

Others were still amongst the rest of the population, but the communist government had made several declarations that the German population should be exploited as forced labor, instructing a minimum of 60 hours work per week with no rights for breaks. The salaries were insufficient for survival, usually 25 or 50 percent of Polish salaries.

=== Czechoslovakia ===
The German-speaking population of the Sudetenland was, in the same case as Poland, expelled after the war. The expulsion was not indiscriminate, however, since as late as 1947, large numbers of skilled German workmen were still being detained. Germans were forced to wear a white armband with the letter "N", for Němec, signifying an ethnic German in Czech, to identify them (even German Jews had to wear it).

Czech Deputy Premier Petr Mareš has in the past, in vain, tried to arrange compensation for ethnic Germans who were forcibly resettled or used as forced labor after the war.

== Western Europe ==
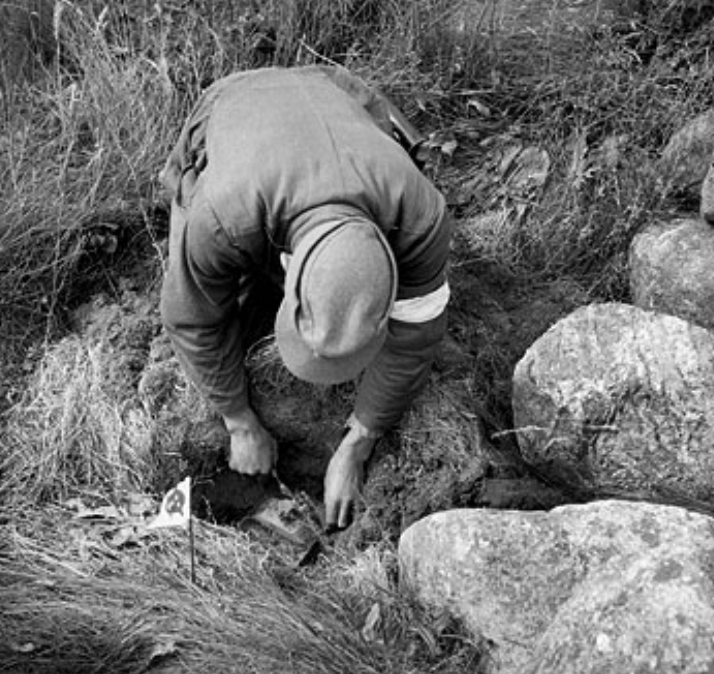
German soldier clearing a mine near Stavanger, Norway, August 1945

=== Background ===
Contrary to Section IV of the Hague Convention of 1907, "The Laws and Customs of War on Land", the SHAEF "counter insurgency manual" included provisions for forced labor and hostage taking.

=== Denmark ===
Under an agreement between the German Commander General Georg Lindemann, the Danish Government, and the British Armed Forces, German soldiers with experience in defusing mines were required to clear minefields in Denmark. It is estimated that more than 2,000 prisoners cleared over 1.3 million German land mines from Denmark's shores and fields from May to September 1945. 149 of them lost their lives during the five months of mine clearing, 165 were severely wounded, and 167 were lightly wounded.

The events were dramatized in the 2015 film Land of Mine.

=== France and Low Countries ===
German prisoners were forced to clear minefields in Denmark, Norway, France and the Low Countries.

According to Simon MacKenzie, "callous self-interest and a desire for retribution played a role in the fate" of German prisoners. MacKenzie notes that sick or otherwise unfit prisoners were forcibly used for labor, including highly dangerous work such as mine-clearing in France and the Low Countries; "by September 1945 it was estimated by the French authorities that two thousand prisoners were being maimed and killed each month in accidents."

Some of the 740,000 German prisoners transferred in 1945 by the U.S. for forced labor in France came from the Rheinwiesenlager camps; these forced laborers were already very weak, many weighing barely 50 kilograms (110 lb).

In retaliation for acts of resistance, French occupation forces expelled more than 25,000 civilians from their homes. Some of these civilians were subsequently forced to clear minefields in Alsace.

=== Norway ===
In Norway, the last available casualty record, from August 29, 1945, shows that by that time a total of 275 German soldiers had been killed while clearing mines, while an additional 392 had been maimed. German protests that forcing POWs to clear mines was against international law (per article 32 of the Geneva Conventions) were rejected with the assertion that the Germans were not POWs; they were disarmed forces who had surrendered unconditionally (avvæpnede styrker som hadde overgitt seg betingelsesløst). Mine clearance reports received by the Allied Forces Headquarters state: June 21, 1945; 199 dead and 163 wounded Germans; 3 Norwegians and 4 British wounded. The last registration, from August 29, 1945, lists 392 wounded and 275 dead Germans. Mine clearance was then for unknown reasons halted for close to a year before recommencing under better conditions during June–September 1946. This time many volunteered thanks to good pay, and death rates were much lower, possibly due to a deal permitting them medical treatment at Norwegian hospitals.

=== United Kingdom ===
In 1946, the UK had more than 400,000 German prisoners of war, many of whom had been transferred from POW camps in the U.S. and Canada. Many of these were used as forced laborers, as a form of war reparations.

The two main reasons for their continued presence in Britain were to denazify them (in particular German officers), and for non-officers employment as agricultural and other labor. In 1946 a fifth of all agricultural work in the UK was performed by German prisoners. A public debate ensued in the UK, where protests over the continued usage of German labourers raged in the British media and in the House of Commons. In 1947 the Ministry of Agriculture argued against rapid repatriation of working German prisoners, since by then they made up 25 percent of the land workforce, and they wanted to keep employing them into 1948. Faced with political difficulties in using foreign labor, the Ministry of Agriculture offered a compromise, in which German prisoners of war who volunteered were to be allowed to remain in Britain as free men. Following disputes about how many former prisoners of war would be permitted to remain voluntarily in Britain and whether they would first have to return briefly to Germany before being allowed to officially migrate to Britain, by the end of 1947 about 250,000 of the prisoners of war were repatriated, and the last repatriations took place in November 1948. About 24,000 chose to remain voluntarily in Britain.

=== United States ===
The United States transferred German prisoners for forced labor to Europe (which received 740,000 from the US). Repatriation for prisoners in the U.S. was also delayed for harvest reasons.

Civilians aged 14–65 in the U.S. occupation zone of Germany were also registered for compulsory labor, under threat of prison and withdrawal of ration cards.

Tens of thousands of Axis prisoners of war including Germans were put to work in the United States in farms, mills and canneries. These prisoners were paid $0.80 per day for their labor (equivalent to $15 in 2025 dollars). By contrast, wages for farm laborers in the USA had reached an average of $85.90 per month (equivalent to $1,536 in 2025 dollars) or ~$2.82/day (equivalent to $50 in 2025 dollars) in January, 1946.

=== Conclusion ===
Most German POWs of the Americans and the British were released by the end of 1948, and most of those in French captivity were released by the end of 1949.

According to the Office of Public Administration (part of Federal Ministry of the Interior), compensation for Germans used as forced labor after the war cannot be claimed in Germany since September 29, 1978, due to the statute of limitations.

== See also ==
- American food policy in occupied Germany
- Forced labor in Germany during World War II
- Foundation "Remembrance, Responsibility and Future"
- Industrial plans for Germany
- Reparations Agreement between Israel and West Germany
- Unfree labor
