= Polish concentration camp =

Polish concentration camp(s) or Polish death camp(s) may refer to:

- German camps in occupied Poland during World War II
- Camps for Russian prisoners and internees in Poland (1919–1924)
- Camps for soldiers of the UNR Army interned in Poland (1919–1924)
- Bereza Kartuska Prison
- Zgoda labour camp
- Jaworzno concentration camp
- "Polish death camp" controversy
