= An Eye for an Eye (Sack book) =

1993 book by John Sack

An Eye for an Eye: The Untold Story of Jewish Revenge Against Germans in 1945
- Author: John Sack
- Genre: History
- Publisher: Basic Books
- Publication date: October 1993
- Media type: Print (Hardcover)
- Pages: 272
- ISBN: 978-0-465-04214-2

An Eye for an Eye: The Untold Story of Jewish Revenge Against Germans in 1945 is a 1993 book by John Sack, in which Sack states that some Jews in Eastern Europe, Czechoslovakia, and Poland took revenge on their former captors while overseeing over 1,000 concentration camps in Poland for German civilians.

In his book, Sack provides details of the imprisonment of 200,000 Germans, "many of them starved, beaten and tortured"; and estimates that "more than 60,000 died at the hands of a largely Jewish-run security organisation."

== Discourse ==
A professor of Jewish history at Brandeis University, Antony Polonsky, said that his "research appears to be sound", but he and other reviewers have questioned the "extent of Jewish persecution of Germans", in Sack's book.

Polish historians including Tadeusz Wolsza from the Polish Academy of Sciences and Krzysztof Szwagrzyk from the Institute of National Remembrance inform that in 1945–1950 there were between 206 and 500 internment camps set up mostly by the Soviet NKVD at the former Nazi slave-labor camps in Greater Poland and across Silesia, but the numbers reaching or ever exceeding 1,000 have no grounds in reality.

According to Holocaust writer Daniel Goldhagen's review of the book in The New Republic, most of the people working in these camps were not Jewish and Goldhagen argued Sack did his best to conceal this. Goldhagen cited a November 1945 report that only 1.7% of the members of the Office of State Security were Jews as refutation of Sack's figure of 75%.

Sack responded that he had stated his figure for officers in Kattowitz in February, not all members in November, and that he had also written that hundreds of Jews left OSS during the year.

Sack said that he attempted to publish a response in a letter to the editor of The New Republic but the magazine refused it. Sack said that The New Republic agreed to publish his reply as an advertisement, but later reversed its position.

Sack has responded to American critics of the book who say that it is "sensational and its charges inadequately attributed to source" by replying that his extensive research left little doubt that Jews ran the Świętochłowice "Zgoda" camp "from the bottom to the top". He added "It pains me as a Jew to report this".

Sack expressed surprise at criticisms denying the accuracy of his claims, asserting that the main points have been repeatedly confirmed by others, the TV programme 60 Minutes and The New York Times among them.

In 1995, the German publisher Piper Verlag pulled the book after printing it, apparently in response to a review by journalist Eike Geisel that called it "antisemitic fodder". According to Sack, Geisel claimed to quote a passage that doesn't exist in the book. It was published by another German publisher instead.

== See also ==
- Other Losses (controversial 1989 book by James Bacque about the deaths of German POWs after the war)
- Nemesis at Potsdam (1977 book by Alfred-Maurice de Zayas)
- Salomon Morel
