= Czesław Gęborski =

Polish communist resistance fighter (1925–2006)

Czesław Gęborski (Polish pronunciation: [ˈt͡ʂɛswav ɡɛmˈbɔrskʲi]; 5 June 1924 in Dąbrowa Górnicza – 14 June 2006) was a captain of the security forces of the People's Republic of Poland. He is best known for his role as commander of the Łambinowice transfer and internment camp created in the former German Stalag VIII-B. In October 1945 he was dismissed from the post and charged with setting fire to one of the barracks in the camp and ordering gunfire on the inmates trying to put out the flames, an incident in which 48 prisoners died.

== Life ==
Until the outbreak of World War II, Gęborski was a factory worker in Dąbrowa Górnicza. Arrested by the Nazis, he was imprisoned in the labour camp in Kochłowice, a district of Ruda Śląska. In 1943 he was able to escape and join the Armia Ludowa communist resistance organization. Arrested again in 1944 he was bound for Auschwitz concentration camp, but his transport was liberated by Polish partisans before it reached the camp. Near the end of the war he joined the Milicja Obywatelska and the infamous Ministry of Public Security, where he was quickly promoted to the rank of sergeant.

Until March 1945 he served in Świętochłowice (Zgoda labour camp) and then in Niemodlin. Finally in July 1945 he became commander of the transfer and internment camp in Łambinowice, a concentration camp designed for Germans and Poles deemed dangerous by the new communist regime of Poland. He served in that post until October, when he was removed because of numerous abuses. However, by 1947 the investigation against him was dropped without any charges being presented and Gęborski was promoted to the rank of captain.

In 1956, during the Khrushchev Thaw following the end of Stalinism in Poland, the investigation was resumed and Gęborski was arrested, but the court declared him not guilty. Gęborski then continued his career in the ranks of the Służba Bezpieczeństwa. In the 1960s he demanded compensation for the 22 months spent in prison prior to his trial, but the court declared that the arrest had been necessary. Finally, after the end of communist rule in Poland, in the late 1990s, the trial for the 1945 incident in Łambinowice was resumed by the local court in Opole. However, it had to be postponed - and finally terminated in 2005 - due to the poor health of both Gęborski and the witnesses. Gęborski died June 14, 2006.

== See also ==
- Salomon Morel
- Polish partisans
