= Salomon Morel =

Polish NKVD and MBP officer

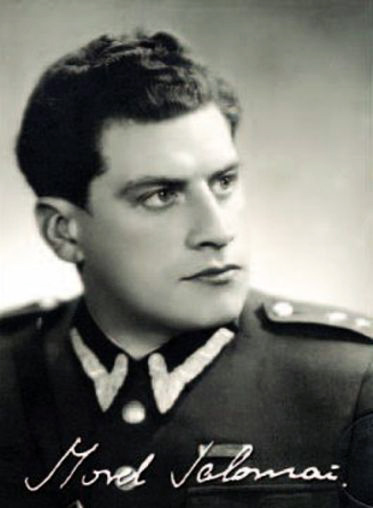
- Salomon Morel in 1948; Morel was accused of war crimes and crimes against humanity in 1995 in absentia
- Born: November 15, 1919; Garbów, Poland
- Died: February 14, 2007 (aged 87); Tel Aviv, Israel
- Citizenship: Polish, later Israeli
- Occupation: officer at the Ministry of Public Security
- Known for: Commander of Zgoda labour camp and Jaworzno concentration camp

Salomon Morel (November 15, 1919 – February 14, 2007) was an officer in the Ministry of Public Security in the Polish People's Republic, and a commander of concentration camps run by the NKVD and communist authorities until 1956.

After Nazi Germany occupied Poland, Morel and his family went into hiding to avoid being placed in one of the Jewish ghettos in German-occupied Poland. Both Salomon and his brother survived part of the war and Holocaust under the protection of a local Polish farmer, before joining communist partisans.

In 1944 Morel became warden of the Soviet NKVD prison at Lublin Castle. During most of 1945, he was commander of the Zgoda labour camp in Świętochłowice. In 1949 he was made commander of Jaworzno concentration camp and remained a commandant of numerous concentration camps until they were all closed down in 1956 following the Polish October. He then worked as head of prison in Katowice and was promoted to the rank colonel in the political police, the MBP. He was dismissed during the 1968 Polish political crisis which saw the purging of ex-Stalinists.

Beginning in the early 1990s Morel was investigated by Institute of National Remembrance for war crimes and crimes against humanity, including the revenge killings of more than 1,500 prisoners in Upper Silesia, most of whom were either native speakers of Silesian German or Polish political prisoners. In 1996, he was indicted by Poland on charges of torture, war crimes, crimes against humanity and communist crimes. After his case was publicized by the Polish, German, British, and American media, Morel fled to Israel and was granted citizenship under the Law of Return. Poland twice requested his extradition, once in 1998 and once in 2004, but Israel refused to comply and rejected the more serious charges as being false and again rejected extradition on the grounds that the statute of limitations against Morel had run out and that Morel was in poor health. Polish authorities responded by accusing Israel of applying a double standard, and the controversy over Morel's extradition continued until his death.

== Background and youth ==
Salomon Morel was born on November 15, 1919, in the village of Garbów near Lublin, Poland, the son of a Jewish baker who owned a small bakery. During the Great Depression, the family business began to falter. Therefore, Morel moved to Łódź where he worked as a sales clerk, but returned to Garbów following the outbreak of war in September 1939.

== World War II and early NKVD service ==
Morel's family went into hiding during World War II to avoid being placed in the ghetto. Morel's mother, father and one brother were killed by the Blue Police during Christmas of 1942. Solomon Morel and his brother Izaak survived the Holocaust hidden by Józef Tkaczyk, a Polish Catholic. In 1983, Józef Tkaczyk was designated as one of the Righteous Among the Nations by Yad Vashem for saving the Morel brothers.

Morrel's two brothers died during the war, one in 1943, another in 1945. According to the IPN, as the Eastern Front advanced, Morel and other communist partisans came out of hiding. In the summer of 1944, Morel joined the Milicja Obywatelska in Lublin. Later, he became a warden at the Lublin Castle, where many soldiers of the anti-communist Armia Krajowa (Home Army) were imprisoned and tortured.

The Israeli mass media and government presented yet a different version of his life. The Israeli letter rejecting extradition states that Morel joined the partisans of the Red Army in 1942, and was in the forests when his parents, sister-in-law, and one brother were allegedly killed by Blue Police. According to a number of media sources, Morel claimed that he was at one point an inmate in Auschwitz and over thirty of his relatives were killed in the Holocaust.

== Commander of Zgoda labour camp ==
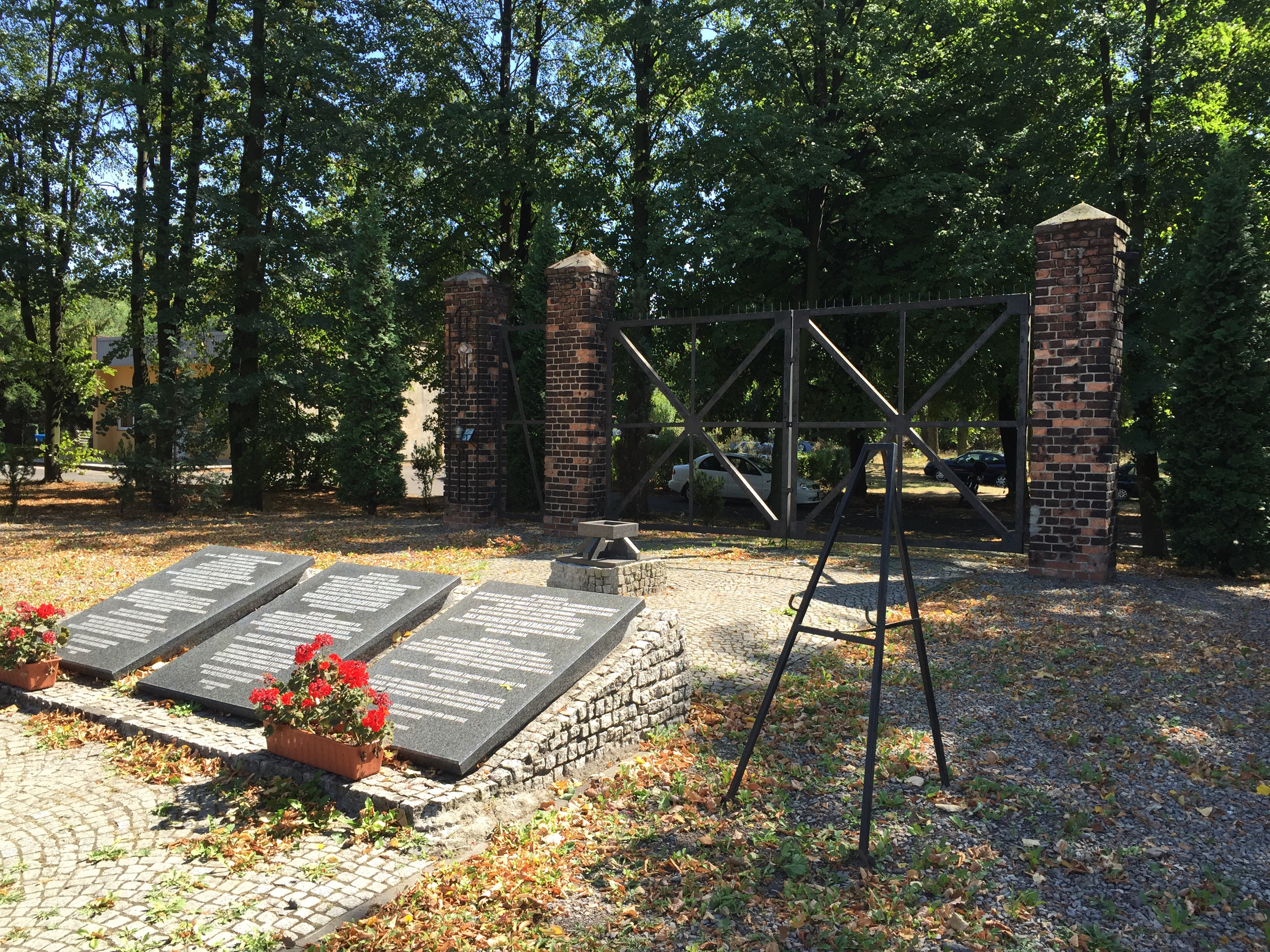
Memorial to the victims of "totalitarian violence inflicted by the Nazi and the Communist regimes" in front of the former main gate of Zgoda camp, with text in Polish, German and English

On March 15, 1945, Morel became commander of the infamous Zgoda camp in Świętochłowice. The Zgoda camp was set up by the Soviet political police, or NKVD, after the Soviet Army entered southern Poland. In February 1945 the camp was handed over to the Polish Ministry of Public Security. Most prisoners in the camp were Silesians and German citizens, while a small number were from "central Poland", and about 38 foreigners.

Sometimes children were sent to the camp along with parents. Prisoners were not accused of any crime, but were sent by decision of Security Authorities. Authorities tried to convince society that prisoners were only ethnic Germans and former Nazi war criminals and collaborators. Keith Lowe notes that "in reality almost anyone could end up there" and the memorial in front of the camp's main gate describes the prisoners as mainly local population. It is estimated that close to 2,000 inmates died in the camp where torture and abuse of prisoners were chronic and rampant and resulted in an average 100 inmate deaths a day. Solomon Morel's preferred method of torture was the ice water tank where prisoners would be put in with freezing water up to their necks until they died. The camp was closed in November 1945.

The survivor Dorota Boriczek described Morel as "a barbaric and cruel man" who often personally tortured and killed prisoners. Gerhard Gruschka, a local Upper Silesian of Polish descent, was imprisoned in Zgoda when he was 14 years old and wrote a book about his experiences, detailing the endemic torture and abuse in the camp. Morel was also accused of an extensive pattern of sadistic torture in John Sack's book An Eye for an Eye: The Untold Story of Jewish Revenge Against Germans in 1945, which contributed to publicizing his case in the Anglophone world in the 1990s.

Historians Nicholas A. Robins and Adam Jones note that Morel "presided over a murderous regime founded on ubiquitous assaults and atrocities against German captives." Keith Lowe notes that "when millions of bruised and destitute refugees began flooding into Germany in the autumn of 1945, they brought with them some disturbing stories of places they called 'hell camps', 'death camps' and 'extermination camps'". Zgoda camp was among the most notorious of these camps, and is discussed in detail by Lowe. Lowe notes that survivors' stories of Zgoda and other camps had a profound impact on West German society and that their stories were taken extremely seriously by the German government and the general population as examples of Stalinist brutality.

== Commander of Jaworzno concentration camp ==
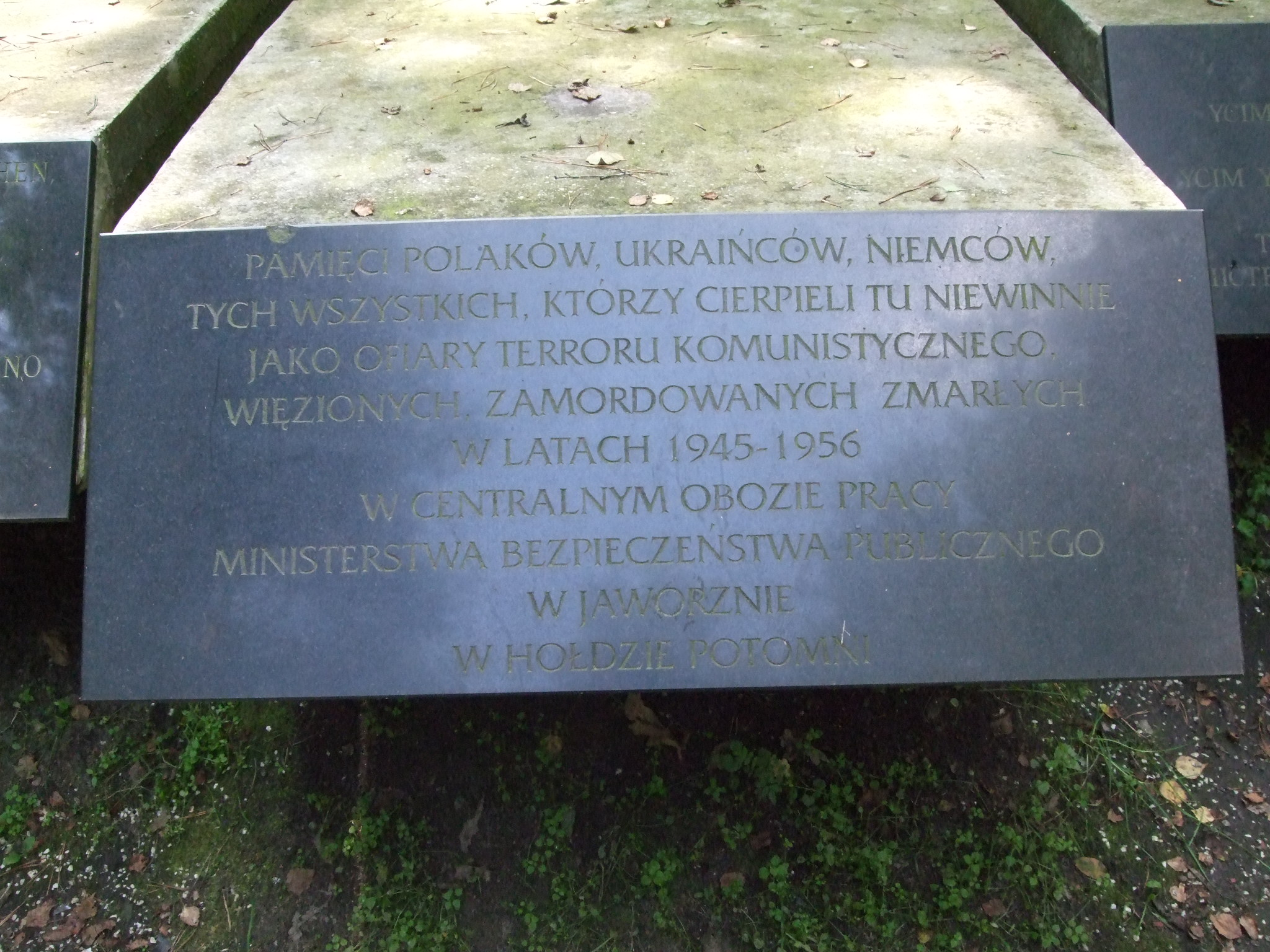
Memorial plate at the Stalinist-era Jaworzno concentration camp (1945–1956)

From February 1949 to November 1951 Morel was commander of Jaworzno concentration camp, a Stalinist-era concentration camp for political prisoners (designated "enemies of the nation") in Poland. By that time he already had a reputation in Poland as an "exceptional sadist." During Morel's time as the commandant the prisoners were primarily Poles who were arrested for their opposition to Stalinism, and included soldiers of the Polish Home Army and members of other Polish underground resistance organisations such as Freedom and Independence that was active from 1945 to 1952. Prisoners were often tortured and subjected to forced labor. Morel left the camp when it was turned into a camp for adolescent political prisoners.

== Later career ==
Morel continued working as commandant of Stalinist-era concentration camps until 1956. When the Polish October weakened the hard-line Stalinist faction in Poland, the Stalinist concentration camps were closed down. After 1956, Morel worked in various prisons in Silesia and was promoted to the rank of colonel in the political police, the MBP. In the 1960s he was head of a prison in Katowice. In 1964 he defended his master's degree with a thesis on the economic value of forced labor at Wrocław University's Law School. During the 1950s, the Polish communist government awarded him the Cavalry Cross of the Polonia Restituta and the Golden Cross of Merit.

=== Dismissal ===
Morel was dismissed from his position in May 1968 in the wake of the 1968 Polish political crisis, which saw the purging of both Jewish officials and ex-Stalinists. As Morel was both Jewish and had a background as head of Stalinist-era concentration camps, he became an obvious target for the 1968 campaign. Unlike most other Polish Jews, and although the Polish communist government pressured Jews to emigrate, Morel nevertheless chose to remain in Poland, and lived there as a retiree from the age of 49.

== Criminal prosecution ==
In 1990, after the fall of communism, the General Commission for the Investigation of Crimes against the Polish Nation, precursor to the Institute of National Remembrance, started investigating the abuses carried out at the Zgoda camp. Fearing prosecution, Morel emigrated to Israel in 1992.

=== Indictment ===
In 1996 Salomon Morel was formally indicted of genocide by the Polish public prosecutor's office. The indictment was later amended to include war crimes, crimes against humanity and communist crimes. The latter charge was added in 2004 and constitutes a specific crime under Polish criminal law.

=== Extradition controversy ===
In 1998, Poland requested that Morel be extradited for trial, but Israel refused. A reply sent to the Polish Justice Ministry from the Israeli government said that Israel would not extradite Mr. Morel as the statute of limitations had expired on war crimes.

In April 2004, Poland filed another extradition request against Morel, this time with fresh evidence, upgrading the case to "communist crimes against the population." The main charge against Salomon Morel was that, as commandant of the Zgoda camp at Świętochłowice, he created for the prisoners in this camp, out of ethnic and political considerations, conditions that jeopardised their lives, including starvation and torture. The charges against Morel were based primarily on the evidence of over 100 witnesses, including 58 former inmates of the Zgoda camp. In July 2005 this request was again formally refused by the Israeli government. The response rejected the more serious charges as being false, potentially part of an antisemitic conspiracy, and again rejected extradition on the grounds that the statute of limitations against Morel had run out, and that Morel was in poor health. Ewa Koj, a prosecutor with the Polish Institute of National Remembrance, criticized the decision. “There should be one measure for judging war criminals, whether they are German, Israeli or of any other nationality,” Koj said. Morel died in Tel Aviv on February 14, 2007, seventeen years after the investigation and prosecution of him started.

=== Legacy ===
Anne Applebaum describes Morel as

a Holocaust victim, a communist criminal, a man who lost his entire family to the Nazis, a man consumed by a sadistic fury against Germans and Poles – a fury which may or may not have originated from his victimhood, and may or may not have been connected to his communism. He was deeply vengeful, and profoundly violent. He was awarded medals by the communist Polish state, was prosecuted by the post-communist Polish state, and was defended by the Israeli state, though he had expressed no interest in moving to Israel until half a century after the war, and even then only after he started to fear prosecution.

== See also ==
- Czesław Gęborski
- Helena Wolińska-Brus
- Nachman Dushanski, Lithuanian SSR
- John Sack, An Eye for an Eye: The Story of Jews Who Sought Revenge for the Holocaust
- John Demjanjuk
