= Eike Geisel =

German journalist

- Born: 1945
- Died: 6 August 1997 (aged 51–52)
- Occupation: Journalist

Eike Geisel (1945 – 6 August 1997) was a German journalist known in Germany and Israel for his polemical essays on German and Jewish history and on Zionism.

== Literary career ==
A characterization of the book An Eye for an Eye by John Sack in Frankfurter Rundschau (taz had not accepted the article) as "Antisemitische Rohkost" (antisemitic raw food) stopped the German publishing of the translated book in 1986. Geisel published among others in Haaretz, an interview with Tom Segev about Israel's founding fathers. He translated some of Hannah Arendt's work and essays about Zionism, Palestine and Germany into German. Together with Henryk Broder he published essays and a documentary film about Jüdischer Kulturbund (Jewish Cultural Union), an unknown chapter of Jewish German cultural life during the Nazi era.

== Published works ==
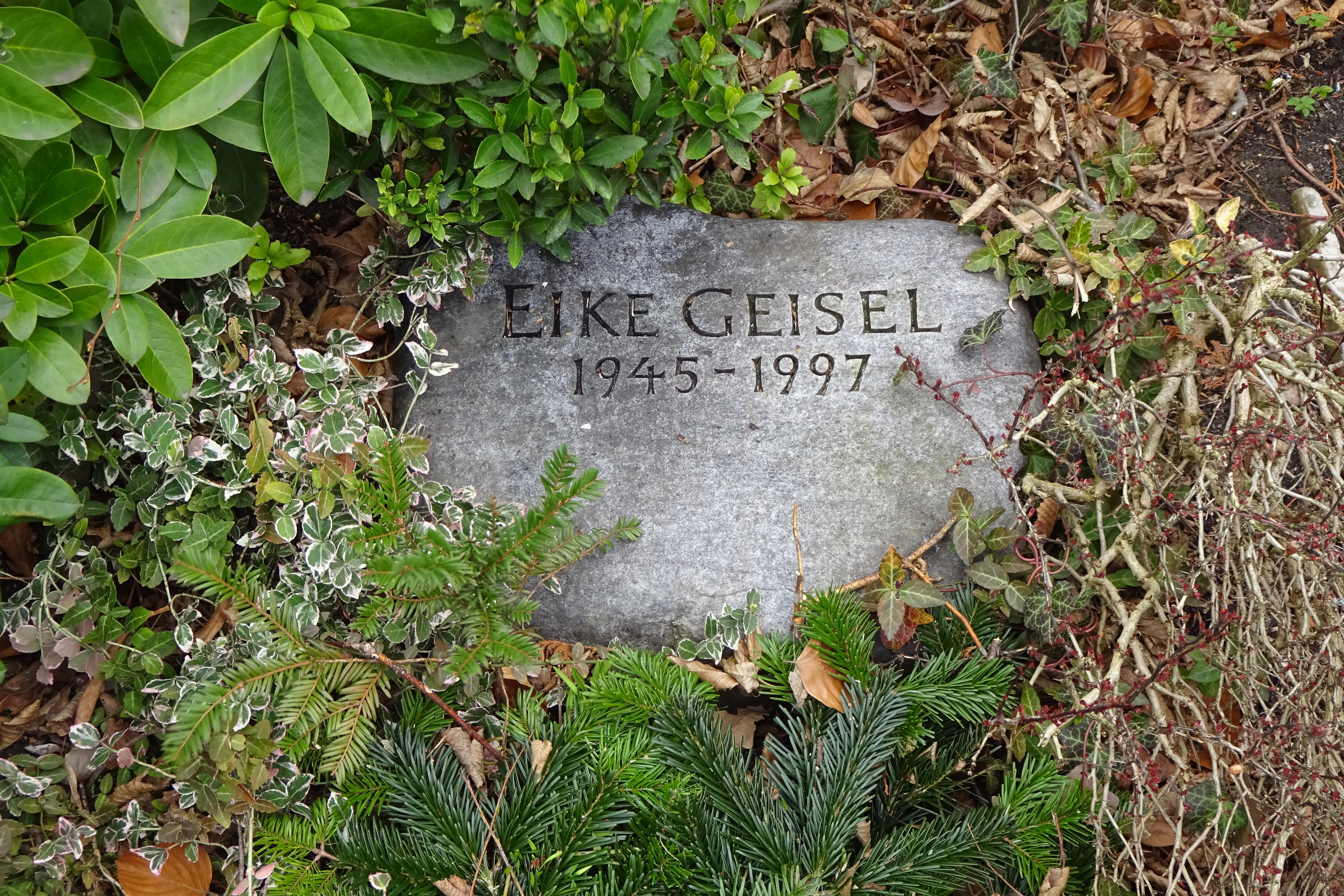
Eike Geisel's grave in III. Städtischer Friedhof Stubenrauchstraße in Berlin-Friedenau

- Vielleicht war das alles erst der Anfang. Tagebuch aus dem KZ Bergen-Belsen 1944-1945 mit Hanna Levy-Hass; Rotbuch Verlag 1979
- Im Scheunenviertel. Bilder, Texte und Dokumente, mit Günter Kunert, Siedler Verlag 1986
- Lastenausgleich, Umschuldung. Die Wiedergutwerdung der Deutschen. Essays, Polemiken, Stichworte; Taschenbuch 1984
- Das Ende Israels? Nahostkonflikt und Geschichte des Zionismus mit Nathan Weinstock und Mario Offenberg; Wagenbach 1985
- Essays und Kommentare 2. Die Krise des Zionismus von Hannah Arendt, mit Klaus Bittermann; Edition Tiamat 1989
- Premiere und Pogrom. Der Jüdische Kulturbund 1933–1941, mit Henryk M. Broder; Siedler, Berlin 1992 ISBN 3-88680-343-0
