= Tori Haring-Smith =

American academic administrator

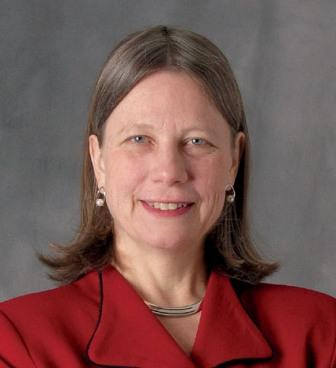

12th President of Washington & Jefferson College
- In office January 1, 2005 – August 1, 2017
- Preceded by: G. Andrew Rembert (acting); Brian C. Mitchell
- Succeeded by: John C. Knapp

Personal details
- Born: Chicago, Illinois
- Spouse: Robert Haring-Smith
- Children: Whitney Haring-Smith
- Education: Swarthmore College (BA); University of Illinois at Urbana-Champaign (MA, PhD)
- Profession: Writer

Tori Haring-Smith is an American academic and the former president of Washington & Jefferson College.

== Education ==
Haring-Smith received a bachelor's degree from Swarthmore College and doctoral and master's degrees from the University of Illinois at Urbana-Champaign. As an undergraduate, she received a Thomas J. Watson Fellowship to study abroad. She visited ten of the smallest countries in the world, inspired by John Sack's' Report from Practically Nowhere (1959).

== Academic career ==
Haring-Smith was a professor of theatre and writing at Brown University for 16 years. During her time at Brown, she funded, established, and administered the Rose Writing Fellows Program, a cross-curricular writing and speaking initiative. She later served as chair of the Department of Performing and Visual Arts at the American University in Cairo.

She returned to the United States to serve as Executive Director of the Thomas J. Watson Foundation, and then served as Vice-President for Educational Affairs and Dean of the College of Liberal Arts at Willamette University in Salem, Oregon.

== Presidency of Washington and Jefferson College ==
Haring-Smith was named as the 12th president of Washington & Jefferson College on October 17, 2005. She is also the first woman to serve as president of the college. During her tenure at Washington & Jefferson College, Haring-Smith began a policy of offering "Good Neighbor" scholarships to eligible students from the seven southwestern Pennsylvania counties closest to the college and twice visited the White House to discuss college affordability issues. She also launched Washington & Jefferson's Magellan Project, which provides scholarships for students to pursue independent projects abroad during the summer. When Haring-Smith retired, the Magellan Project had spent $1 million to fund 500 student trips. During her final year, the College was also recognized as a top producer of Fulbright scholars.

Haring-Smith led a capital campaign that raised more than $100 million for Washington & Jefferson College to support students, faculty and update campus facilities. The college also shifted to buying 50% of its energy from wind farms.

As president of the college, Haring-Smith specifically criticized the U.S. News & World Report rankings system, noting that the "financial resources" portion of the rankings formula favors colleges that have higher tuition, even without providing any educational benefits, saying that this has harmed the college's ranking because it charged $5,000 to $7,000 less in tuition than its peer institutions. She also questioned the "peer assessment" portion of the rankings and suggested that college presidents are rarely aware of educational improvements in their peer institutions; she noted that Washington & Jefferson College's ranking has remained the same for a number of years, even while the college made significant improvements in acceptance rates and overall selectivity, added academic programs, and constructed additional buildings. Haring-Smith's criticism of the rankings spurred Bob Morse, the founder of the U.S. College Rankings system to respond to the criticisms directly in an article. She signed the "Presidents Letter", a nationwide movement asking fellow college presidents to decline participation in the U.S. News & World Report reputation survey, a subjective evaluation where college administrators score their competition.

She retired from Washington & Jefferson College on June 30, 2017.

== Personal life ==
Tori Haring-Smith is married to Robert H. Haring-Smith, and together they have one son, Whitney Haring-Smith. Whitney and his wife, Abigail Seldin, cited Tori Haring-Smith as their inspiration for starting College Abacus, a company that provided financial aid estimates for prospective college students.

Academic offices
Preceded by G. Andrew Rembert	President of Washington and Jefferson College; 2005–2017	Succeeded by John C. Knapp
