= Forced labor of Poles after World War II =

- Central Labour Camp Jaworzno
- Gulag
  - Borovichi camp
- Forced labor of Germans in the Soviet Union - ethnic Poles were among "German" forced workers
