= Potulitz concentration camp =

Nazi concentration camp

Potulice (Potulitz) concentration camp
- Concentration camp
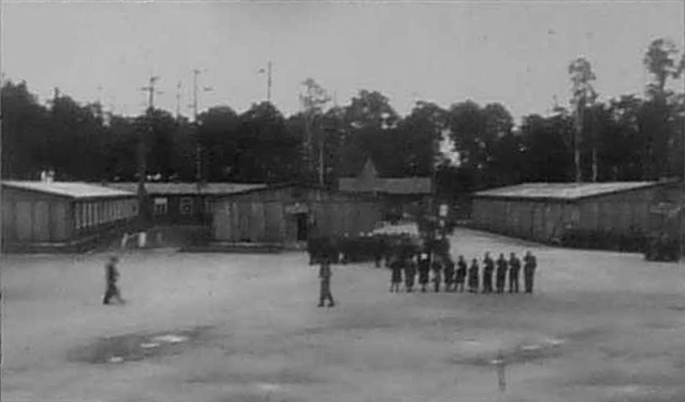
- Nazi concentration camp Potulice in occupied Poland. Work brigade, pictured

- Location of the former Potulice concentration camp in Poland
- Coordinates: 53°07′30″N 17°41′14″E
- Other names: Lebrechtsdorf
- Location: Potulice, German-occupied Poland
- Operational: 1 February 1941 – 21 January 1945
- Inmates: Expelees from German-occupied Pomerania, forced labourers, kidnapped Polish children: 11,188 prisoners as of 21 January 1945 officially

Potulice concentration camp (German: UWZ Lager Lebrechtsdorf– Potulitz) was a concentration camp established and operated by Nazi Germany during World War II in Potulice near Nakło in the territory of occupied Poland. Until the spring of 1941 it was a subcamp of the Stutthof concentration camp. In January 1942 Potulice became fully independent. It is estimated that a total of 25,000 prisoners went through the camp during its operation before the end of 1944. It became notable also as a detention centre for kidnapped Polish children that underwent the Nazi experiment in forced Germanisation.

== Beginnings ==
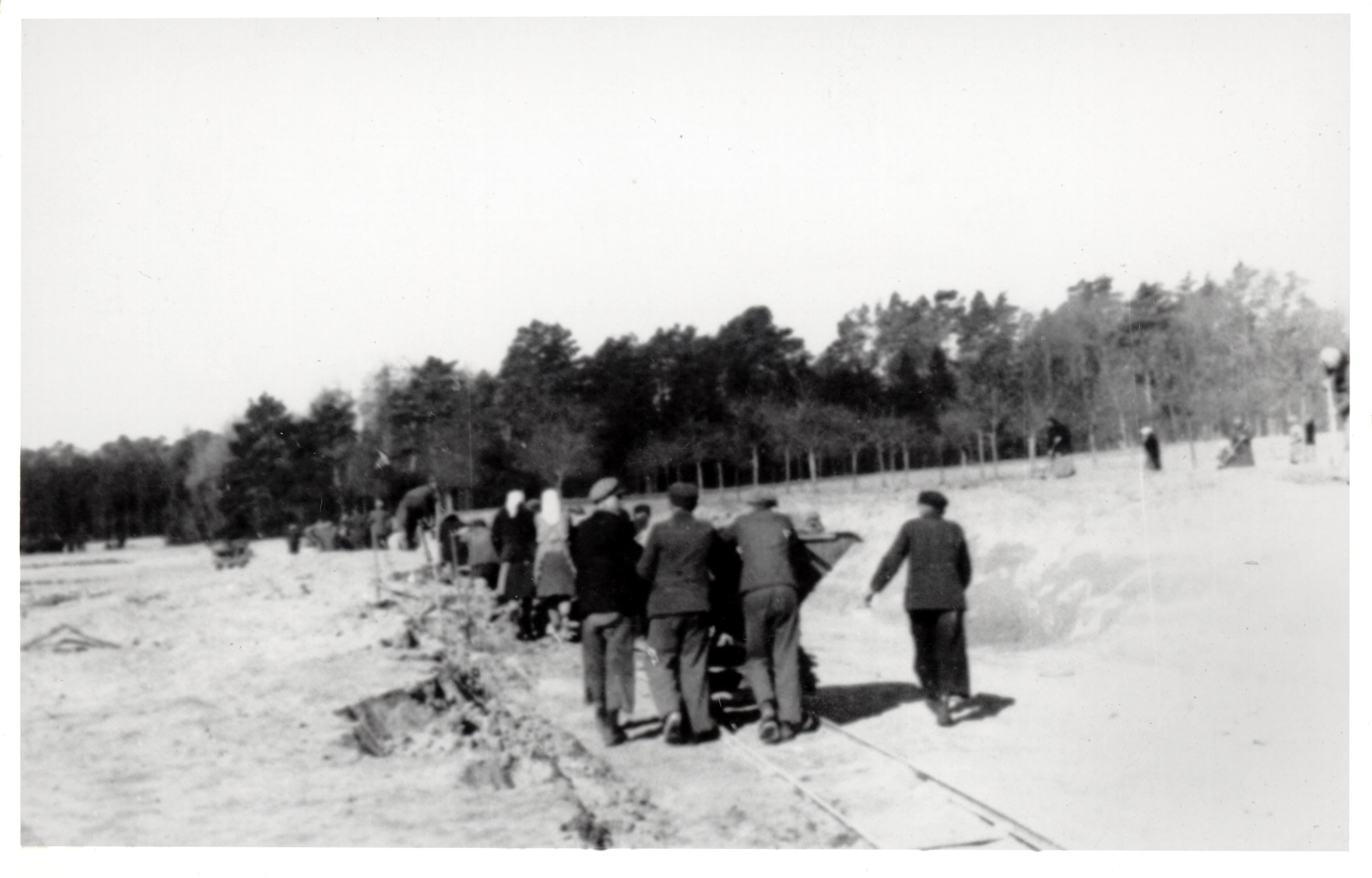
Construction of the camp by its prisoners

Initially the Potulice camp was one of numerous transit points for Poles expelled by the German authorities from territories of western Poland annexed into the newly created Reichsgau Danzig-West Prussia. The forcible displacement of Polish nationals known as Lebensraum; was meant to create space for German colonists (the Volksdeutsche) brought in Heim ins Reich from across Eastern Europe. The facility quickly expanded to include a slave-labor subcamp of the Stutthof concentration camp nearby, supplying a free workforce for the Hansen Schneidemühl machine shop set up on the premises. The first mass transport of 524 Poles came to the Potulice concentration camp from Bydgoszcz on February 4, 1941.

The camp served as a place for detention of Polish children; of the 1,296 people who died there, 767 victims were minors. In 1943 a special unit in the camp was created especially for children and the name „Ostjugendbewahrlager Potulitz” or „Lebrechtsdorf” started to appear in German documentation. Racist theories and a policy of Germanisation that sought to Germanise children who were tested for racial purity of the supposed Aryan race traits led to organised kidnappings by German officials in occupied Poland. The children from the camp were placed there as a result of this policy. If the tests were positive and it was believed the child had lost emotional contact with their parents, then it could be sent to German families for Germanisation. This operation was organised by the SS Rasse und Siedlungshauptamt RuSHA (SS Office of Race and Settlement).

Formally designated a labour camp, the camp was not controlled by concentration camp authorities. However, the conditions in it were comparable to those at the Stutthof concentration camp.

== Slave work and punishment ==
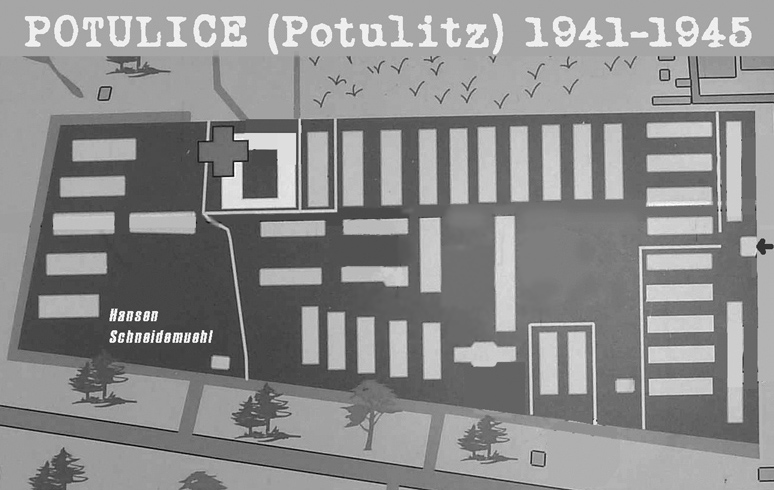
Map of the camp after expansion. The Hansen Schneidemuehl works to the left, separated by the barbed-wire fence with six barracks where the wings of warplanes Bf 109 and Bf 110 were being reconditioned (Potulice Museum)

As part of camp life the children were forced to perform slave work. Children who reached thirteen years old were sent to work outside the camp, even working night shifts. Under the supervision of kapo they usually were used to carry building materials or stones, or used to load coal, wood, and potatoes at the railway station. Children over six years old were forced to work inside the camp. Failure to work as ordered or even minor acts of disobedience were faced with brutal punishments. For example, when the under-fed children were sent to pick up berries, after work they had to show their mouths. If any child had signs of eating the berries, they would be quickly beaten with a heavy whip used for bulls. Other punishments, like standing in the rain or on pine cones, were also commonplace. Regardless of the season of the year, all the children were forced to stand for hours in roll calls (Appells) in their underwear and often without shoes.

One child recalled his ordeal in the camp: "Out of hunger I together with my six-year-old friend decided to take two or three potatoes, which we wanted to roast in an oven. This was seen by some German out of the guardhouse, who ran after us. After taking the potatoes from us, we were taken to the guardhouse and there Germans had beaten us severely. We were hit with leather whips, and during this beating I fainted. I regained consciousness as a result of an enormous pain I felt. I realized that Germans are holding me in place and one of them is burrowing a hole in my leg with a heated iron rod. I started to scream and fainted again."

Nazi concentration camps in occupied Poland (death factories marked with skulls). Potulice, extreme upper-left

Children were also beaten in the face with canes, imprisoned in a bunker that was filled with water up to their knees, or denied food for days. The sight of dying prisoners who couldn't fend off rats attacking them was also a traumatic experience for many. German guards also engaged in psychological torture; for example, the starving children were placed near tables on which bread, cabbage, and cereals were put and the guards would take photographs of the scene, after which the food was taken away from the children. The camp was used also for involuntary blood donations from the young children. There were children born in the camp. These infants faced a harsh fate as their exhausted mothers weren't able to feed them and the food rations were always in short supply. As a result, infants born in the camp usually weighed around 1 kilo and died after a few weeks.

== Increased brutality in the camp ==
As the war went on, conditions in camp became even more brutal and harsh, and penalties such as standing on broken glass were introduced. In 1943 a transport of 543 children from the regions of Smolensk and Vitebsk arrived. Some of the children were treated as normal prisoners, even when they were as young as two years old. As the children were ill from Typhoid fever, the Germans placed them in separate, primitive-condition barracks that were separated by barbed wire. In 1944 the conditions in the camp reached their most brutal phase. Children were regularly called "children of bandits", were beaten and kicked by camp personnel, and were forced to dig trenches. Most of the children had fallen ill, and many died from exhaustion, maltreatment, hunger or disease. Infants were cared for by the older children. There are also witness statements about the deliberate murder of children by camp personnel. One witness described in detail how he had seen three children approximately 7 years old being drowned by Germans near the camp. According to him, Germans first threw the children into a water canal and then threw bricks at them, looking satisfied.

== Assessment ==
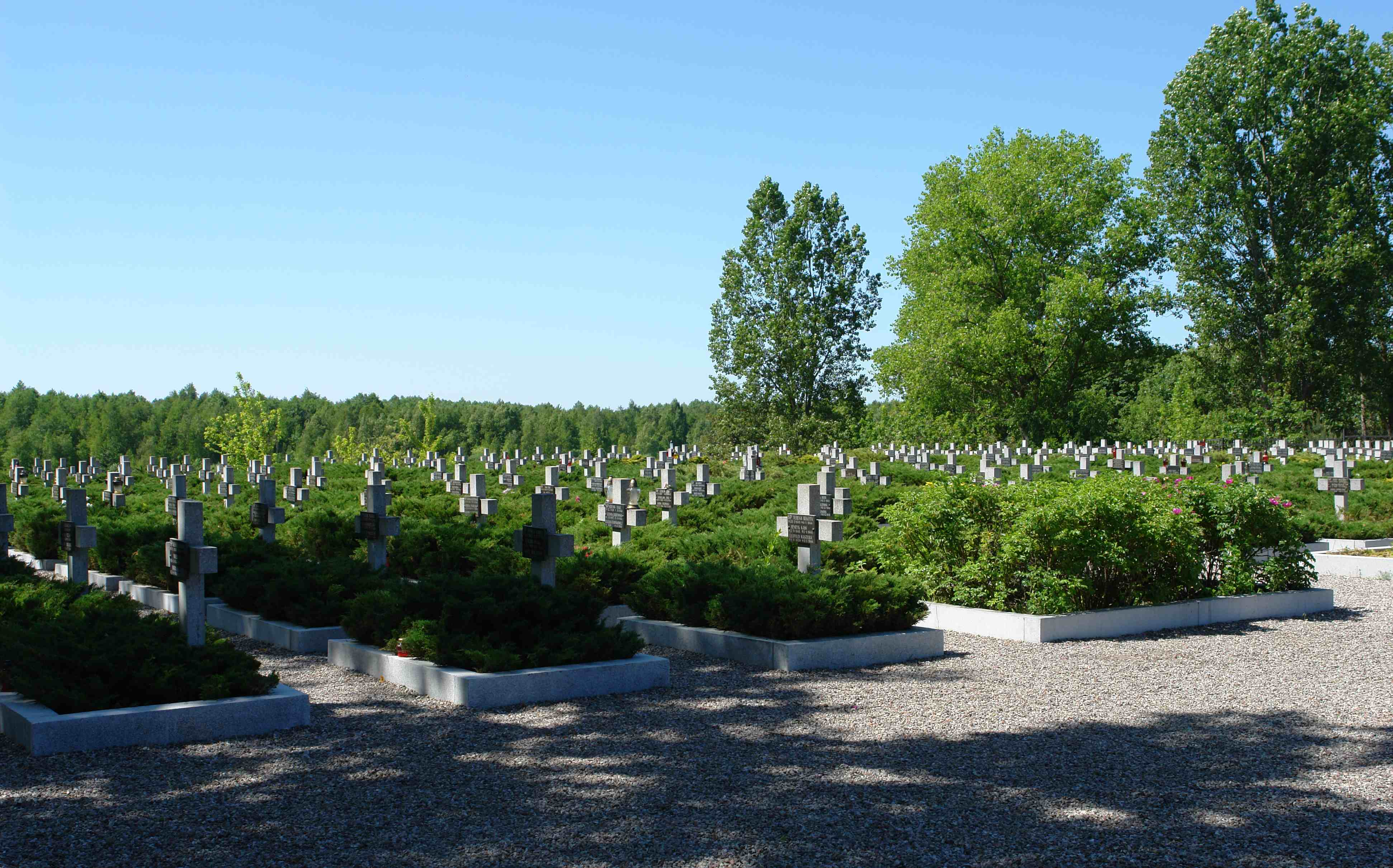
Cemetery of the victims in Potulice

Out of acts listed as genocide by The Convention on the Prevention and Punishment of the Crime of Genocide adopted by the UN General Assembly in December 1948, almost all were implemented in the Potulice camp; the sole exception was the act regarding preventing births among members of the group being subjected to genocide. The number of children kidnapped by German authorities during their occupation of Poland in World War II in order to be Germanised ranges from over 20,000 (Heinemann) to 200,000 (Polish government). It's estimated that at least 10,000 of them were murdered as captives, and only 10-15% returned to their families after the war. Although the Camp was formally listed as a transit camp, after the war, at the request of its victims, in the 1990s it was re-classified as a concentration camp, with the Polish Institute of National Remembrance taking the position that conditions there didn't differ from those in regular concentration camps. The decision was important for the status of compensation paid by post-war Germany towards victims of German repression in World War II.

== The use of the camp after 1945 ==
Following World War II, the site of the camp was used as a detention centre by Polish Communist authorities, mainly for "ethnic Germans" from the Volksliste (DVL) including settlers and some 180 prisoners-of-war, as well as the anti-communist Poles from the Home Army and the National Armed Forces. Renamed as the Central Labour Camp in Potulice under the management of the Stalinist Ministry of Public Security, the camp managed workshops and farms with the total area of 1,174.60 ha. According to records of the MBP Department of Corrections, some 2,915 Germans died there before the end of 1949, mainly as a result of the typhus and dysentery epidemics. According to German sources, about 3,500 ethnic Germans died in the camp in the years 1945 to 1950.

== See also ==
- Germanisation
- Genocide
- Lebensborn
- Lebensraum

== Sources ==
- Polish IPN Bulletin, Issue 12-1(December–January) 2003/2004, Alicja Paczoska Dzieci Potulic.
