= Henryk M. Broder =

German journalist (born 1946)

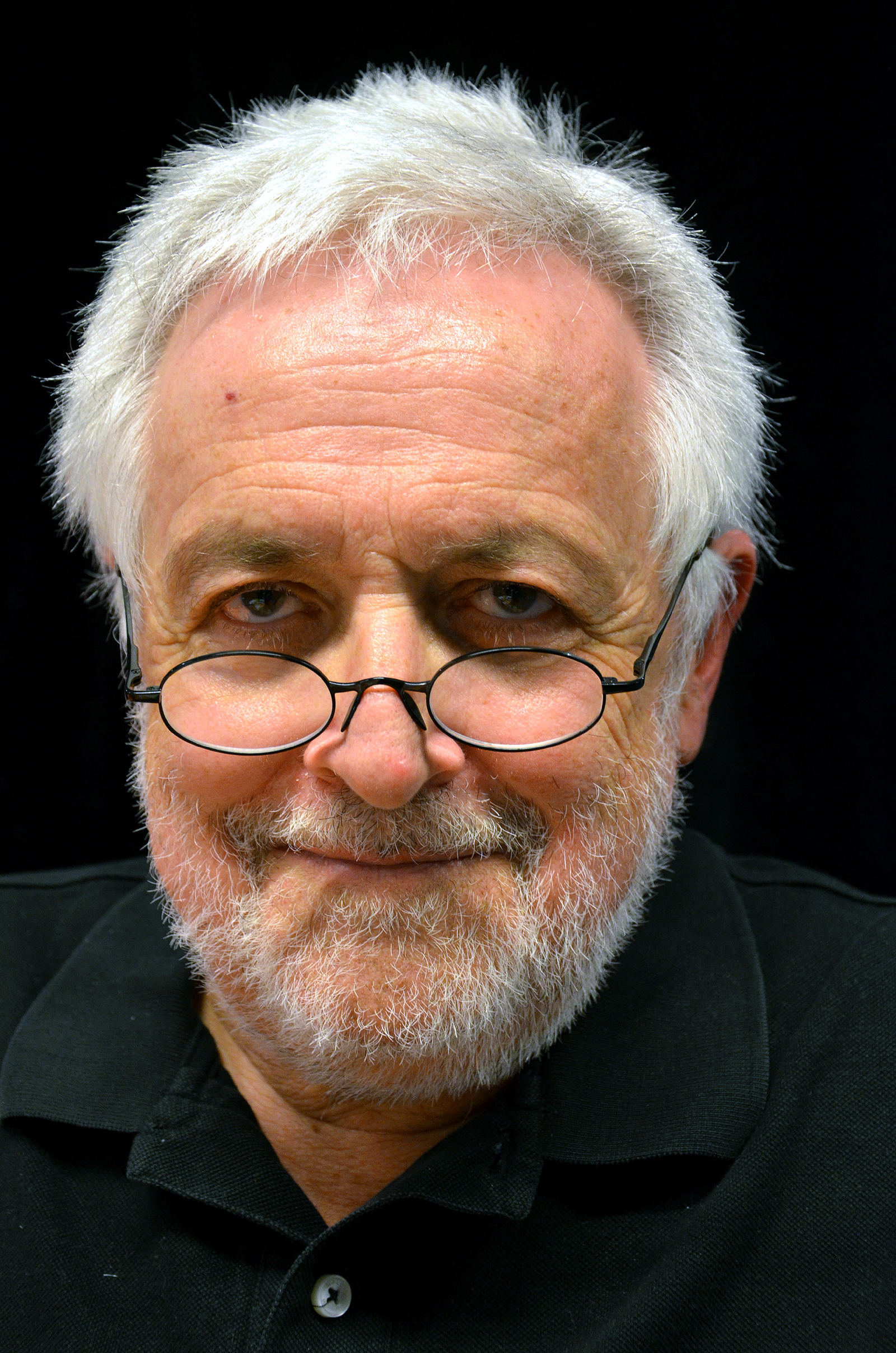
- Broder on 25 September 2013
- Born: Henryk Marcin Broder; 20 August 1946 (age 80); Katowice, Poland
- Occupations: Journalist, author

Henryk Marcin Broder (born 20 August 1946), self-designation Henryk Modest Broder, is a Polish-born German journalist, author, and television personality. He was born into a Jewish family in Katowice, Poland.

Broder is especially interested in Vergangenheitsbewältigung, Islam, Israel, and the Israeli–Palestinian conflict. He sees a close relationship between German criticism of Israel's policies and antisemitism.

== Career ==
=== Views ===
Ever since Operation Entebbe, Broder grew more and more critical of the German approach towards Israel, and what Broder sees as appeasement towards Islamic threats. In Broder's opinion, anti-Zionism is in essence antisemitic.

Broder is also associated with the blog Politically Incorrect and the counter-jihad movement.

=== Accusation of antisemitism ===
In 2006 a German court sentenced Broder to a term in prison after he had publicly accused anti-Zionists like the Dutch-German Jew Hajo Meyer and Abraham Melzer for their putative "capacities for applied Judeophobia" (Kapazitäten für angewandte Judäophobie) because they had compared the Israeli occupation policy to measures taken by the Nazis. On appeal, a court mostly cleared Broder, stating that there was such a thing as "Jewish anti-Semitism."

== Works ==
- Wer hat Angst vor Pornographie? Ein Porno-Report, Melzer, Darmstadt 1970
- As co-author: Die Schere im Kopf. Über Zensur und Selbstzensur, Köln 1976
- Danke schön. Bis hierher und nicht weiter. Mit Beiträgen von Detlef Hartmann, Ulrich Klug, Uwe Maeffert, Ulrich Vultejus, Konkret Literatur-Verlag, Hamburg 1980
- Der Ewige Antisemit. Über Sinn und Funktion eines beständigen Gefühls, 1986
- Fremd im eigenen Land. Juden in der Bundesrepublik, 1987
- Ich liebe Karstadt und andere Lobreden, 1987
- with Geisel, Eike: Premiere und Pogrom. Der Jüdische Kulturbund 1933–1941. Texte und Bilder, Siedler, Berlin 1992
- Erbarmen mit den Deutschen, 1993
- Schöne Bescherung! Unterwegs im Neuen Deutschland, 1994
- Volk und Wahn, Goldmann, München 1996
- Die Juden von Mea Shearim, 1997
- Die Irren von Zion, Hoffmann und Campe, Hamburg 1998
- Jedem das Seine, Ölbaum Verlag 1999
- www.deutsche-leidkultur.de, Ölbaum Verlag 1999
- Kein Krieg, nirgends: Die Deutschen und der Terror, Berlin Verlag, Berlin 2002
- A Jew in the New Germany, University of Illinois Press, Champaign, 2003
- Hurra, wir kapitulieren – Von der Lust am Einknicken, wjs Verlag, 2006
- Kritik der reinen Toleranz, wjs Verlag, Berlin 2008
- Vergesst Auschwitz! Der deutsche Erinnerungswahn und die Endlösung der Israel-Frage, Albrecht Knaus Verlag, Munich 2012

=== Audio ===
- Ach So! Gad Granach und Henryk Broder on Tour, CD, Ölbaum-Verlag, Augsburg 2000, ISBN 3-927217-40-9
