= Stalag VIII-F =

German World War II prisoner-of-war camp

Stalag 318 / Stalag VIII-F / Stalag 344
- Lamsdorf (Łambinowice), Silesia
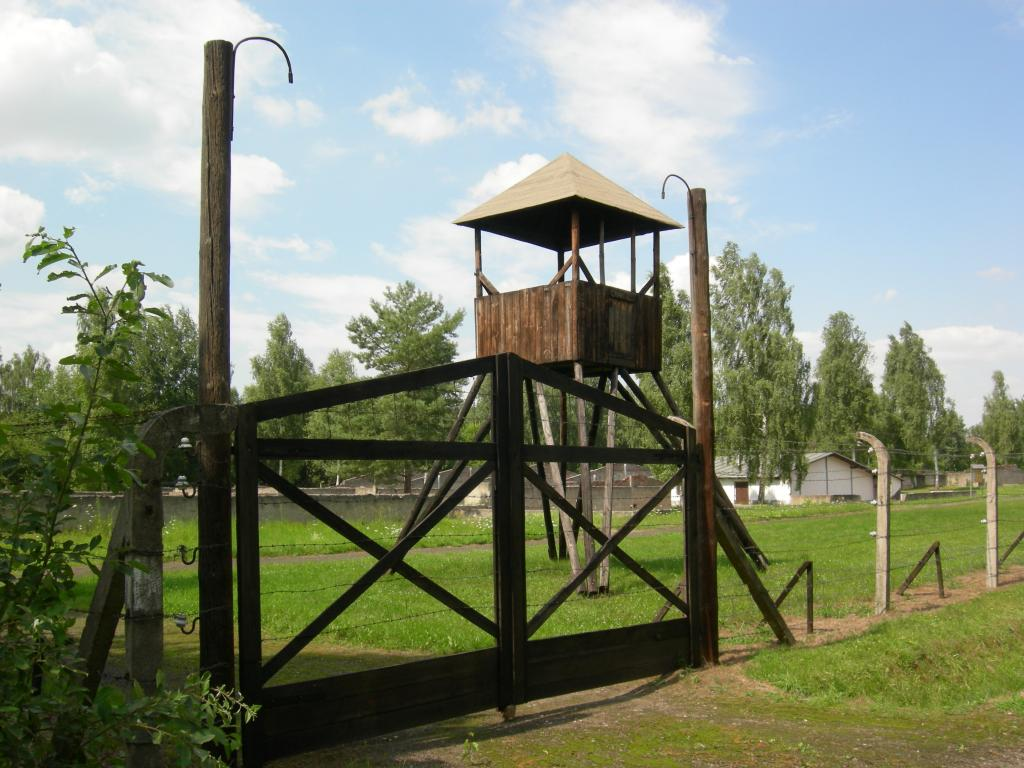
- Lamsdorf watch tower and fence at the Central Museum of Prisoners of War in Łambinowice (reconstruction)

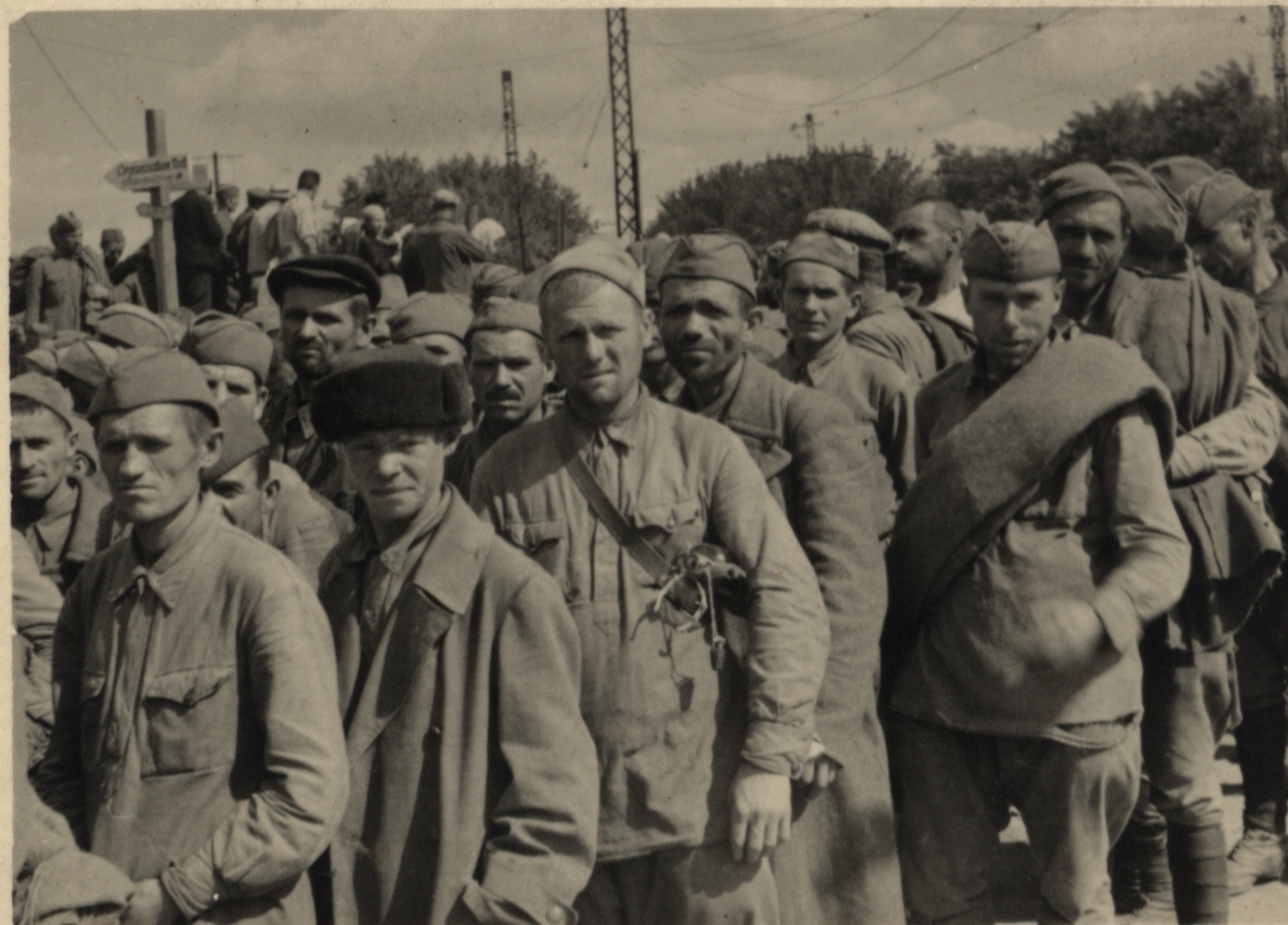
- Soviet prisoners at Lamsdorf

Site information
- Type: Prisoner-of-war camp
- Controlled by: Nazi Germany

Location
- Lamsdorf, Germany (pre-war borders, 1937)
- Location within Poland Location within Germany
- Coordinates: 50.569167°N 17.560164°E

Site history
- In use: 1939–1945
- Battles/wars: World War II

Garrison information
- Occupants: Soviet, Polish and Slovak POWs

Stalag VIII-F was a German prisoner-of-war camp for Soviet Red Army and Polish Home Army (Polish: Armia Krajowa, abbreviated AK) prisoners during World War II. It was located at the northern end of a Germany Army training area at Lamsdorf, Silesia, (now Łambinowice, Poland) just to the north of Stalag VIII-B.

== Camp history ==
Opened in July 1941, it was initially designated Stalag 318, but was renamed Stalag VIII-F towards the end of the year. In June 1943, it came under the control of the nearby Stalag VIII-B, and the complex of camps were in turn redesignated Stalag 344 in November. The camp was known locally as the Russenlager ("Russian camp"), but also held Poles, Italians, Yugoslavs, and Greeks, as well as small numbers of French and Romanians.

Physical and sanitary conditions were very poor, and of the estimated 200,000 Soviet prisoners who passed through the camp, about 40,000 died of starvation, mistreatment and disease. The Germans did not apply the provisions of the Geneva Convention to Soviet prisoners on the grounds that the Soviet Union was not a signatory.

In October 1944, about 6,000 soldiers of the Armia Krajowa arrived after being captured in the Warsaw Uprising. About 400 women soldiers of the AK were also held there temporarily, before being transferred to another camp. At about the same time 1,500 prisoners from Slovak Uprising arrived.

In late January 1945 the camp was evacuated, and the POWs were forced to march westward away from the advancing Soviets. The sick were left behind, and most were dead by the time that detachments of the Red Army reached the camp on 17 March 1945.

== Memorials ==
Most of the camp has been demolished, but a fenced area with a reconstructed watch tower and hut contains an exhibition dedicated to the Soviet POWs. The former Administration block now houses the Central Museum of Prisoners-of-War. In 1997 a granite obelisk, crowned with a cross, was erected to commemorate the Warsaw insurgents.

== See also ==
- List of prisoner-of-war camps in Germany
