= Central Labour Camp in Potulice =

Polish internment camp

Coordinates: 53°07′30″N 17°41′14″E

After the end of World War II, the Central Labour Camp in Potulice (Polish: Centralny Obóz Pracy w Potulicach) became a detention centre for Germans. It was set up by the Soviet and Polish Communist authorities in Potulice in place of the former Nazi German Potulice concentration camp (known as the Ostjugendbewahrlager Potulitz or Lebrechtsdorf camp), the subcamp of Stutthof built in 1941. Following liberation by the Red Army, the camp was controlled by the Soviet NKVD Department of Prisoners and Internees until June 1945. Repopulated, it remained in operation until 1949 under the management of the Stalinist Ministry of Public Security of Poland.

== Camp operation ==
A total of 34,932 people were imprisoned in the camp between 1945 and 1949. At first, the inmates were mainly "ethnic Germans" from the Volksliste (DVL) including some prisoners-of-war, but also women, and 1,285 children – most of them orphaned. The prisoners worked in several workshops on premises as well as in nearby farms owned by the camp administration (with the total area of 1,174.60 ha), between 6.30 a.m. and 17.30 p.m., with one hour break. Reported 2,915 inmates died from typhus and dysentery. It was the result of epidemic conditions prevailing in the camp, and the lack of medical care. The dead were buried in a provisional mass grave in a former sand pit, which was later turned into a garbage dump. Other sources emphasize the total number of prisoners who died there since the inception of the camp in 1941 under the German administration, amounting roughly to 5,000 victims including Poles, Belarusians, Jews and Germans.

In 1950/1951, during the darkest years of Stalinist terror the camp was transformed into a prison for Polish political prisoners. Following the 1961 renovations and the subsequent replacement of barracks with cement structures, it became a prison mainly for criminal offenders. In 1974 a wall was erected around the perimeter. Today, the Penal Unit in Potulice is a state prison with space for 1,446 inmates (underaged, and first-time offenders, as well as criminally insane) featuring a medical clinic.

== Remembrance ==
During the communist rule in the People's Republic of Poland, the memory of post-war events and the human rights abuses in the camp, was censored. Only after the Revolutions of 1989 could this issue be brought into the public debate. Nowadays, close to the memorial to the Nazi camp of Potulice, another memorial was built in 2000 to the post-war labour camp for Germans in Stalinist Poland. The remembrance to both camps brings both German and Polish historical perceptions closer.

== See also ==
- List of concentration and internment camps
- Potulice concentration camp (Lebrechtsdorf Potulitz)
- Zgoda labour camp
- Central Labour Camp Jaworzno

== Notes and references ==
- (in Polish) Information about documentary film "Casus Potulice"
- (in Polish) Information about Potulice prison. Miesięcznik Forum Penitencjarne monthly (ibidem).
- (in Polish) Polski Gułag (Polish Gulag). Wprost weekly newsmagazine, issue 12/2002 (1008), March 24, 2002
- One place - two memories. Double remembrance in Potulice, (ibidem).
