= Report from Practically Nowhere =

1959 travelogue by John Sack

- First edition cover
- Author: John Sack
- Illustrator: Shel Silverstein
- Publisher: Harper & Brothers
- Publication date: 1959

Report from Practically Nowhere is a 1959 humorous travelogue by American journalist John Sack, illustrated by Shel Silverstein. The book consists of thirteen profiles of microstates, principalities, autonomous areas, and other places visited by the author:

- Lundy
- Sark
- Andorra
- Monaco
- Liechtenstein
- San Marino
- Sovereign Military Order of Malta
- Mount Athos
- Sharja
- Swat
- Amb
- Punial
- Sikkim

== Sequels ==
In 1974, Tori Haring-Smith revisited ten of the thirteen countries, supported by a Thomas J. Watson Fellowship.

== See also ==
- News from Nowhere
