= Potulice =

- Village
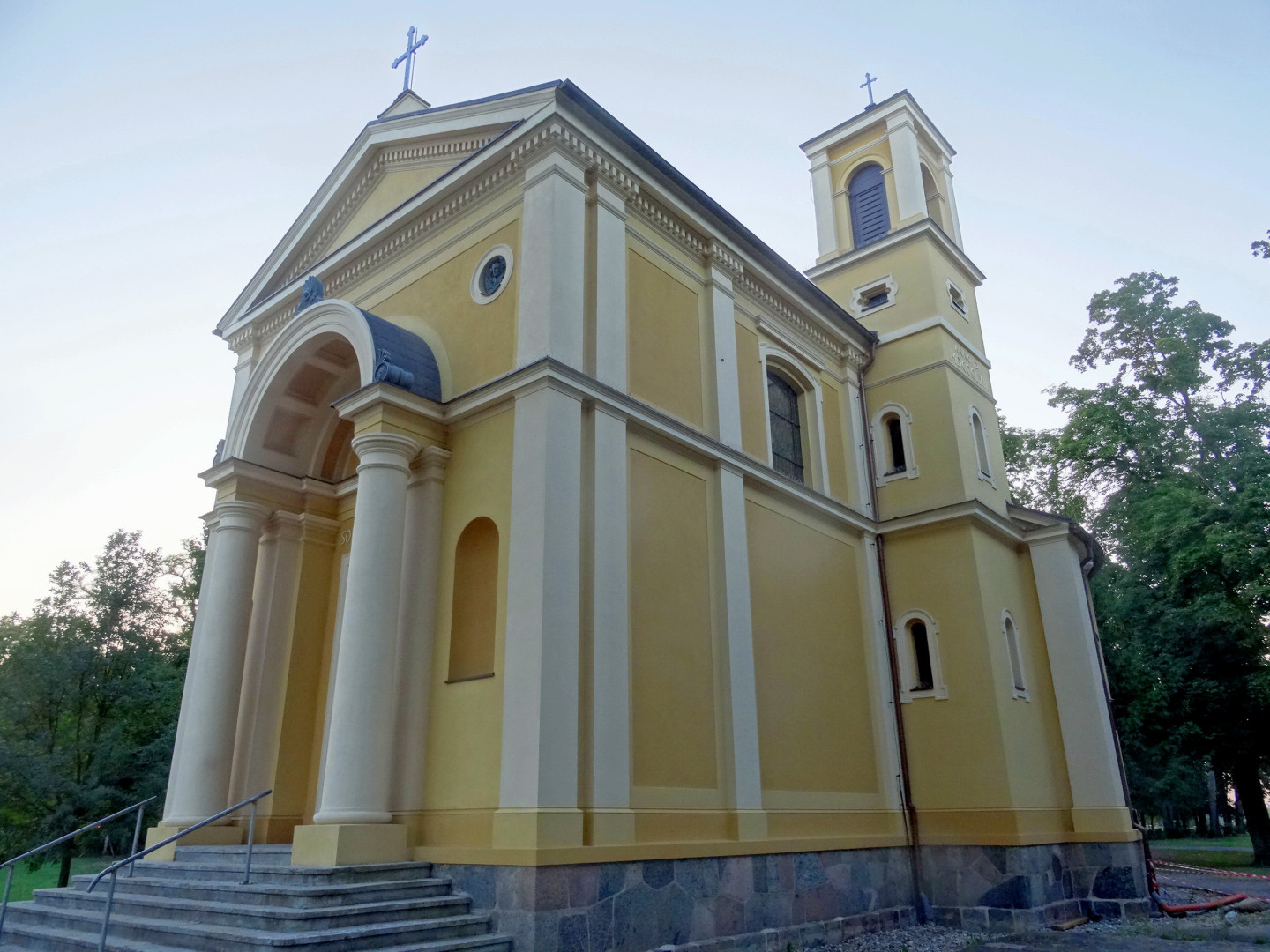
- Annunciation of St. Mary Church in Potulice

- Location within Poland
- Coordinates: 53°7′N 17°41′E
- Country: Poland
- Voivodeship: Kuyavian-Pomeranian
- County: Nakło
- Gmina: Nakło nad Notecią
- Population: 2,100
- Time zone: UTC+1 (CET)
  - Summer (DST): UTC+2 (CEST)
- Vehicle registration: CNA

Potulice ([pɔtuˈlit͡sɛ]; German: Potulitz, 1942–45 Lebrechtsdorf) is a village in the administrative district of Gmina Nakło nad Notecią, within Nakło County, Kuyavian-Pomeranian Voivodeship, in north-central Poland. It is best known as the site of the World War II Nazi German Potulice concentration camp.

== History ==
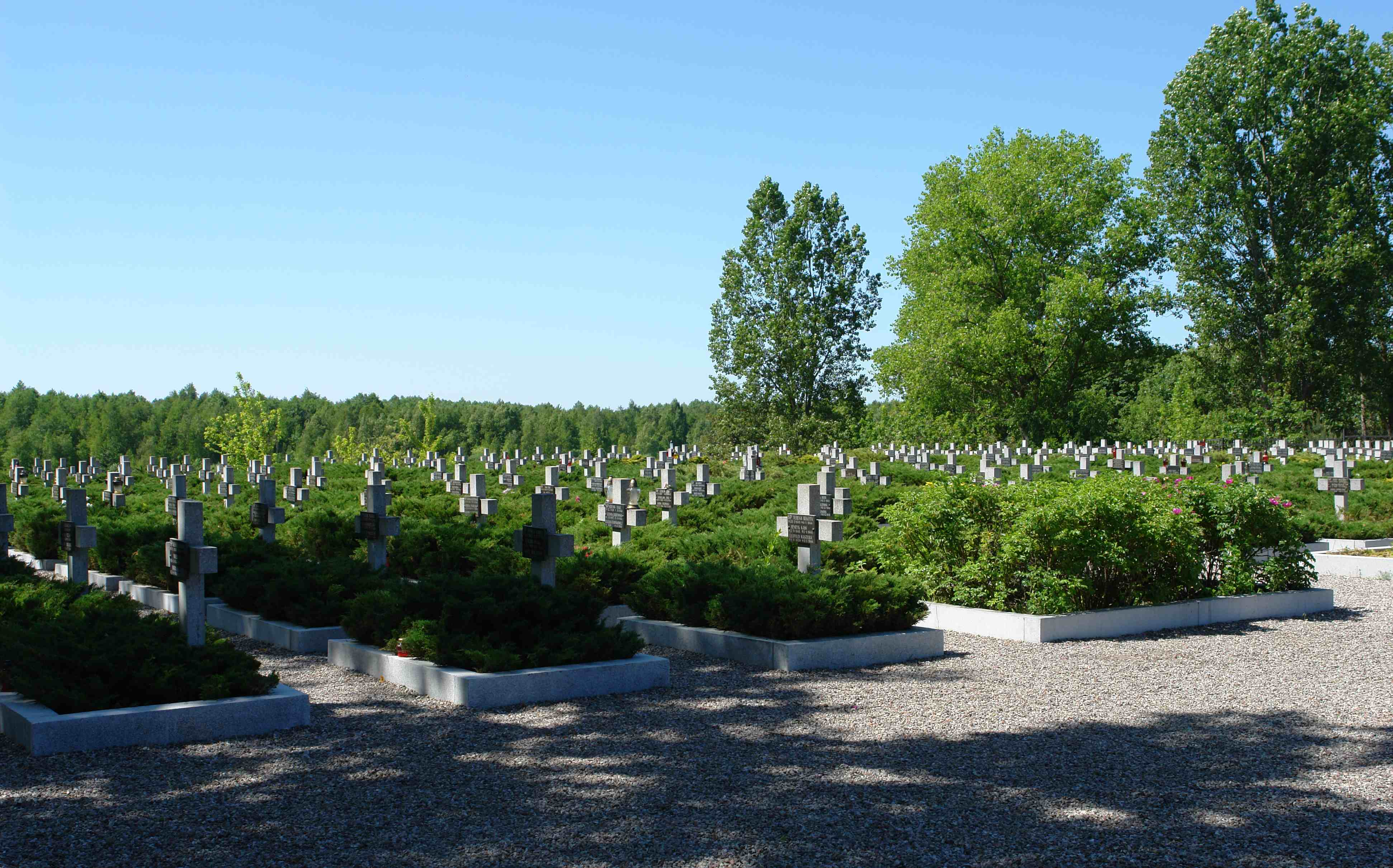
Cemetery of the victims of Nazi Germany

It was part of the Kingdom of Poland until it was annexed by Prussia in the Second Partition of Poland in 1793. In 1807 it was regained by Poles and included within the short-lived Polish Duchy of Warsaw, and after its dissolution in 1815, it was reannexed by Prussia. From 1871 it also formed part of Germany, until it was reintegrated with Poland, after it regained independence following World War I in 1918.

Following the joint German-Soviet invasion of Poland, which started World War II in September 1939, the village was invaded and then occupied by Germany. Germany established and operated a transit camp for Poles expelled from the region, which was soon converted into the Potulice concentration camp. In 1945, the village was liberated and restored to Poland, although with a Soviet-installed communist regime, which then stayed in power until the Fall of Communism in the 1980s. The communists operated the Central Labour Camp Potulice.

== See also ==
- Potulice concentration camp
- Central Labour Camp Potulice
