= Savage Continent =

2012 nonfiction book by Keith Lowe

Savage Continent: Europe in The Aftermath of World War II
- Author: Keith Lowe
- Cover artist: Rob Grom
- Language: English
- Genre: Nonfiction
- Publisher: Penguin Group
- Publication date: April 5, 2012
- Publication place: Great Britain
- Pages: 460
- ISBN: 978-1-250-03356-7

Savage Continent: Europe in The Aftermath of World War II is a 2012 non-fiction book written by English historian Keith Lowe. The full text is divided into four parts with 29 chapters in total. The author recounts the chaotic aftermath of World War II.

== Overview ==
Part One: The Legacy of War has seven chapters. It deals with the immediate aftermath of World War II such as the widespread displacement, absence, and death of millions of people that had occurred.

Part Two: Vengeance has eight chapters. It deals with the liberation of the occupied countries, the Allied occupation of the Axis in Europe, and the treatment of prisoners of war and concentration camp survivors.

Part Three: Ethnic Cleansing has six chapters. It deals with forced migrations and the post-war ethnic cleansing that occurred in countries such as Ukraine and Poland.

Part Four: Civil War has seven chapters as well as the book's conclusion. It deals with the post-war political violence and civil wars, such as The Greek Civil War, as well as the occupation of Eastern Europe by the Soviet Union.

== Reception ==
The Washington Post, The Daily Telegraph, The Sunday Times, The Spectator, The Daily Mail, and The Independent published positive reviews. New Criteron published a balanced review by Andrew Stuttaford. The Washington Independent Review of Books published a critical review.
