= Tadeusz Wolsza =

Polish historian

Tadeusz Wolsza Professor
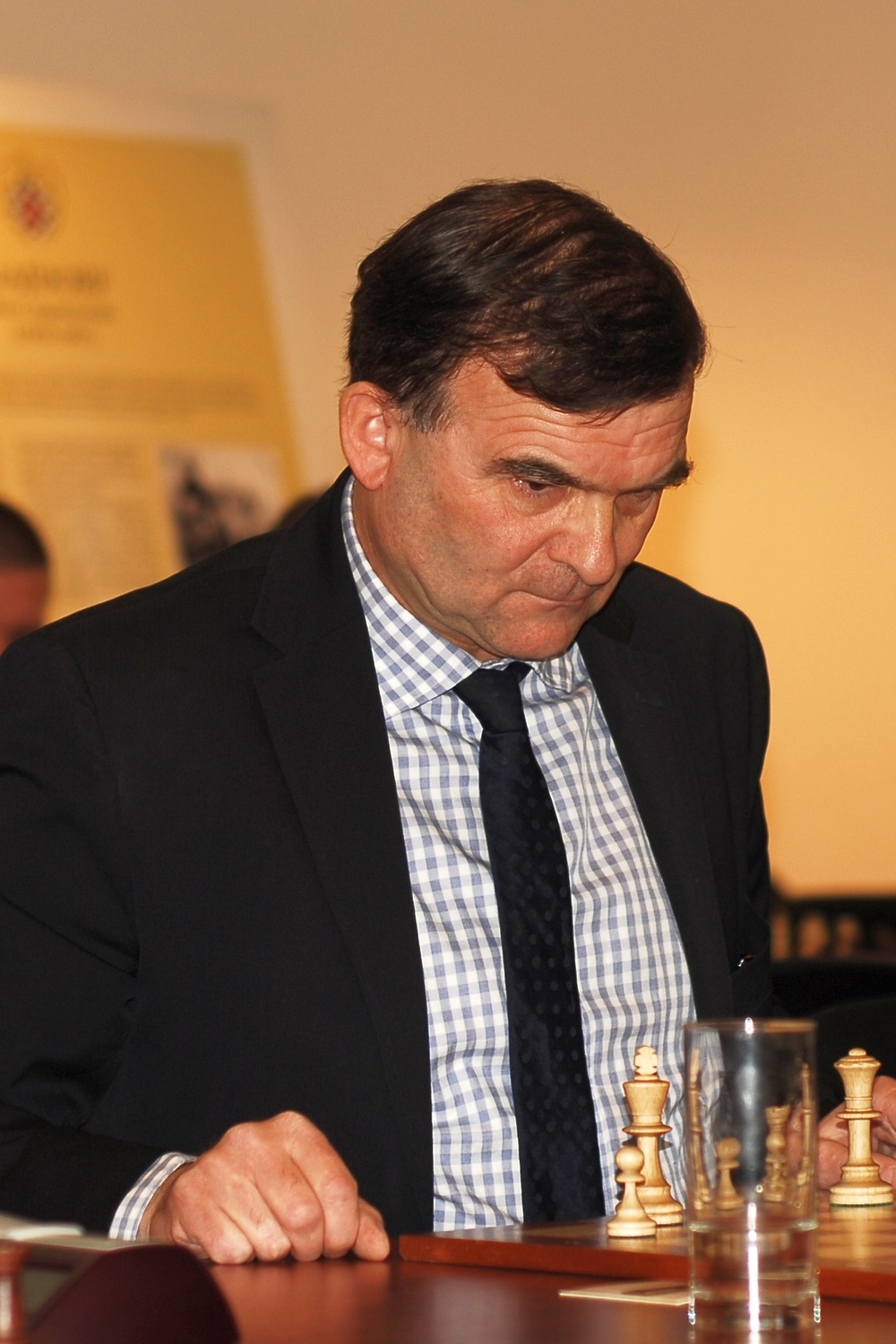
- Tadeusz Wolsza, Warsaw 2013
- Born: 13 May 1956 (age 70); Oława
- Education: Wrocław University
- Occupations: Historian, social scientist
- Employer(s): Institute of History of the Polish Academy of Sciences, Institute of National Remembrance (Board member since 2011)

Prof. Tadeusz Wojciech Wolsza (born 13 May 1956) originally from Oława, is a Polish historian and social scientist, professor at the Institute of History of the Polish Academy of Sciences (PAN); university lecturer, and board member of the Warsaw Institute of National Remembrance since 2011.

Wolsza graduated from the University of Wrocław. In 2007 he became vice-president of the Scientific Advisory Committee at the PAN Institute of History. He is the editor-in-chief of Dzieje Najnowsze refereed journal published by IH PAN. From 1999 Wolsza served as lecturer at the Instytute of Political Sciences of the Bydgoszcz Academy, followed by professorship at the Kazimierz Wielki University in Bydgoszcz. In 2007 he was awarded the title of full professor. Wolsza is the author of over 200 publications including 11 books. He was selected by Sejm to the Board of the Institute of National Remembrance in 2011.

== Selected publications ==
- Arcymistrzowie, mistrzowie, amatorzy... Słownik biograficzny szachistów polskich (t. I–V), DiG, Warszawa 1995–2007
- Dziennikarze władzy, władza dziennikarzom : aparat represji wobec środowiska dziennikarskiego 1945–1990 (współredaktor), IPN, Warszawa 2010
- Najdorf: z Warszawy do Buenos Aires, Penelopa, Warszawa 2010
- Rząd RP na obczyźnie wobec wydarzeń w kraju 1945–1950, DiG, Warszawa 1998, ISBN 83-7181-044-X
- W cieniu Wronek, Jaworzna i Piechcina... 1945–1956: życie codzienne w polskich więzieniach, obozach i ośrodkach pracy więźniów, Instytut Historii PAN, Warszawa 2003, ISBN 83-88909-06-1
- Za żelazną kurtyną, Neriton, Warszawa 2005, ISBN 83-88909-29-0
