= Łambinowice =

- Village
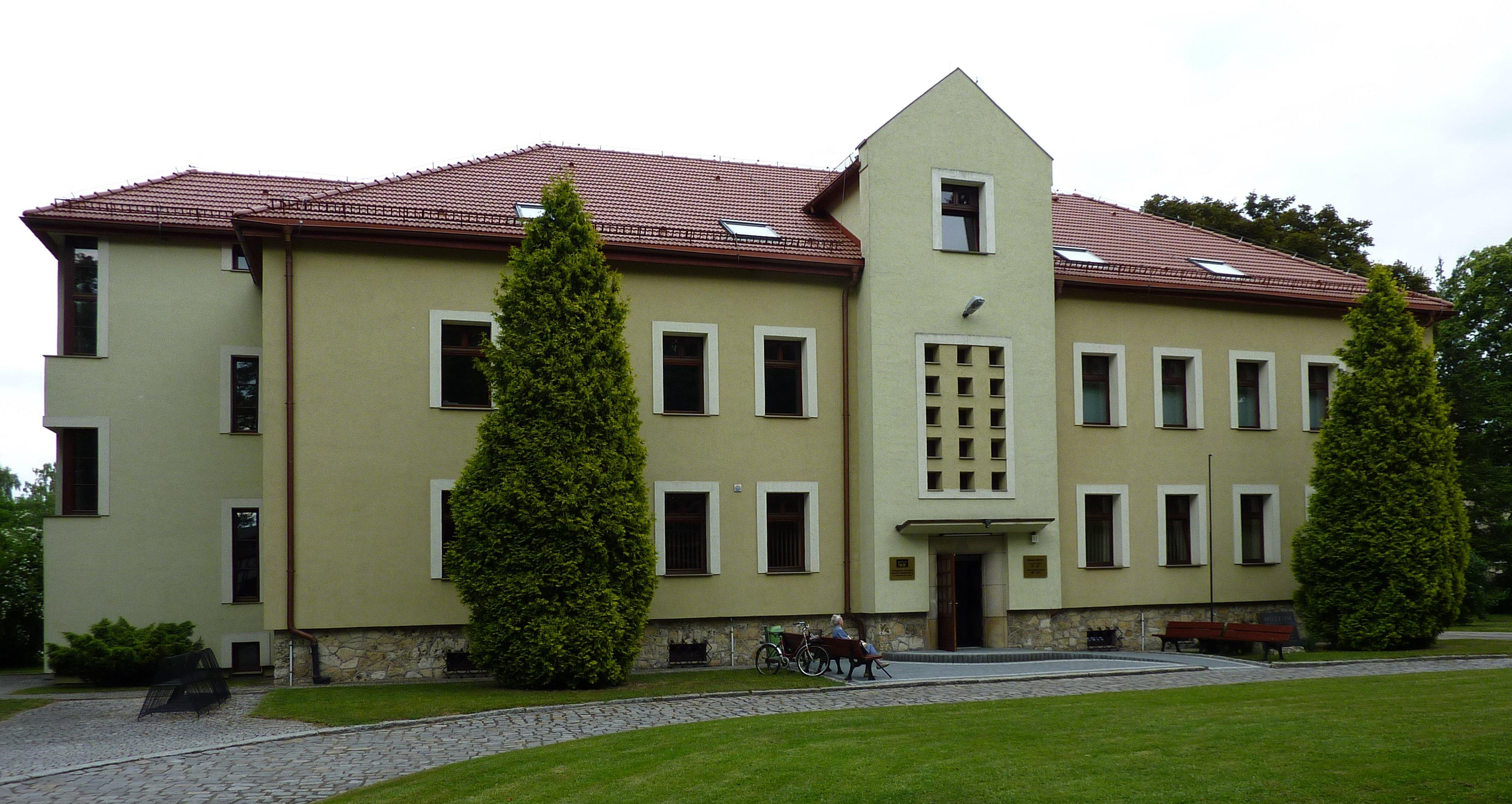
- Central Prisoner of War Museum in Łambinowice

- Coat of arms

- Location within Poland
- Coordinates: 50°32′N 17°33′E
- Country: Poland
- Voivodeship: Opole
- County: Nysa
- Gmina: Łambinowice

Population
  - Total: 2,800
- Time zone: UTC+1 (CET)
  - Summer (DST): UTC+2 (CEST)
- Vehicle registration: ONY
- Website: http://www.lambinowice.pl

Łambinowice (pronounced ['wambinɔˈvit͡sɛ], German: Lamsdorf) is a village in Nysa County, Opole Voivodeship, in southern Poland. It is the seat of the gmina (administrative district) called Gmina Łambinowice.

== History ==
First mentioned under the name of Lambinowicz in 1273, when it was part of fragmented Piast-ruled Poland, the settlement shared the fate of Upper Silesia and the land of Opole throughout the ages. Much damaged by the wars of the 17th century, most notably the Thirty Years' War, it lost much of its meaning as a centre of commerce and was reduced to but a small village.

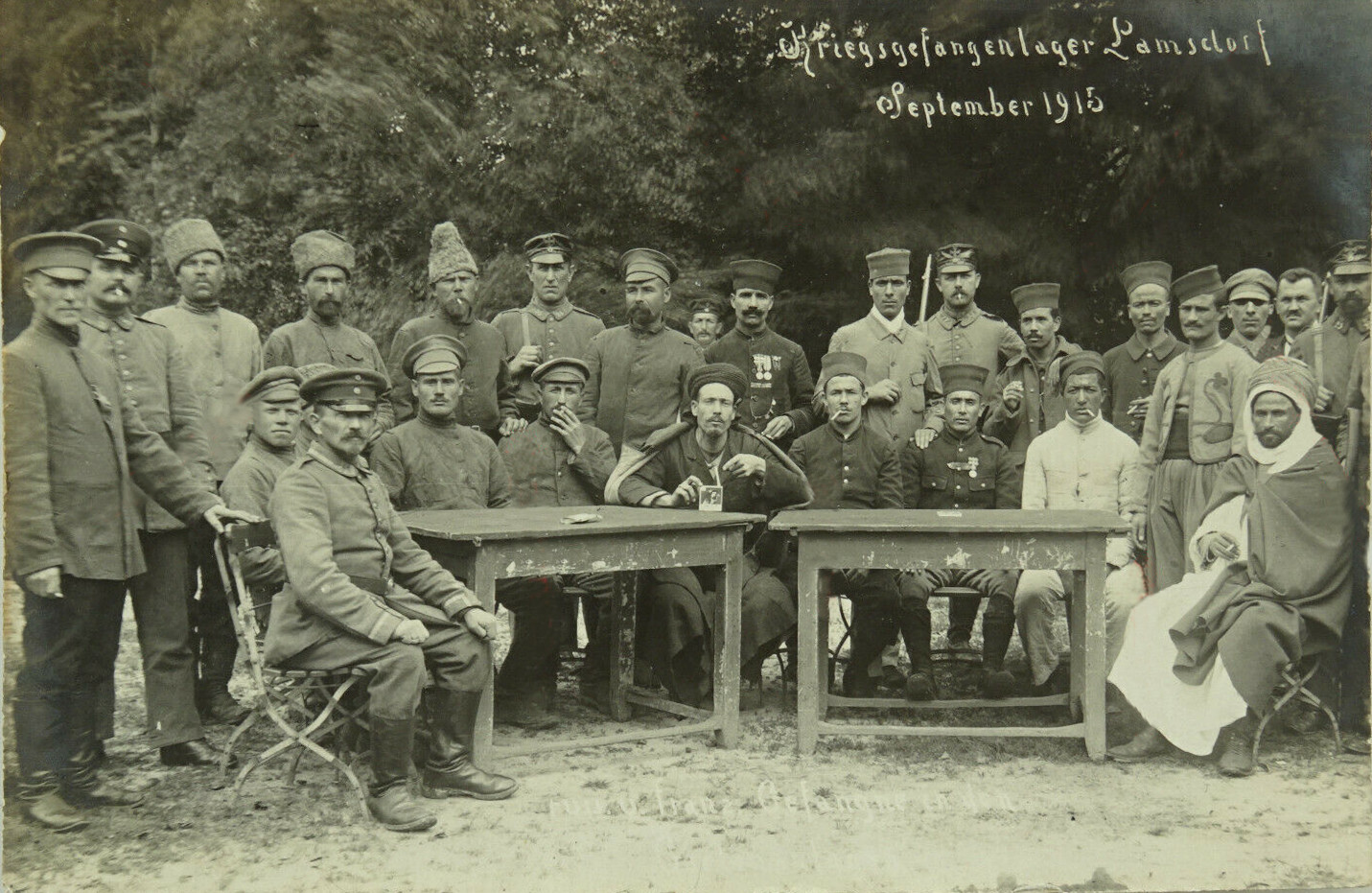
Allied POWs in the camp in 1915

In the 18th century, it was annexed by Prussia, and from 1871 to 1945 it also formed part of Germany. In 1864, a large military training ground was established around the village. During the Franco-Prussian War, a prisoner of war camp for French soldiers was located on the grounds of the training camp. In it more than 3,000 men were incarcerated, 53 of them perished and are buried at the local cemetery. The camp was reactivated during World War I, when the Germans set up one of the largest POW camps, housing roughly 90,000 internees, mostly from the United Kingdom, Russia, Italy and Serbia. Due to poor housing conditions roughly 7,000 men died in captivity.

Closed down following the Treaty of Versailles, the camp was reopened on 26 August 1939, shortly before the German invasion of Poland and start of World War II. The infamous Stalag VIII-B camp housed roughly 100,000 Polish prisoners. In 1940, some of the Poles were transferred to other places of detention and the Germans brought French, British and Cypriot POWs to the camp, and in 1941, thousands of Soviet prisoners were amassed in tragic conditions in a separate camp named Stalag VIII-F.

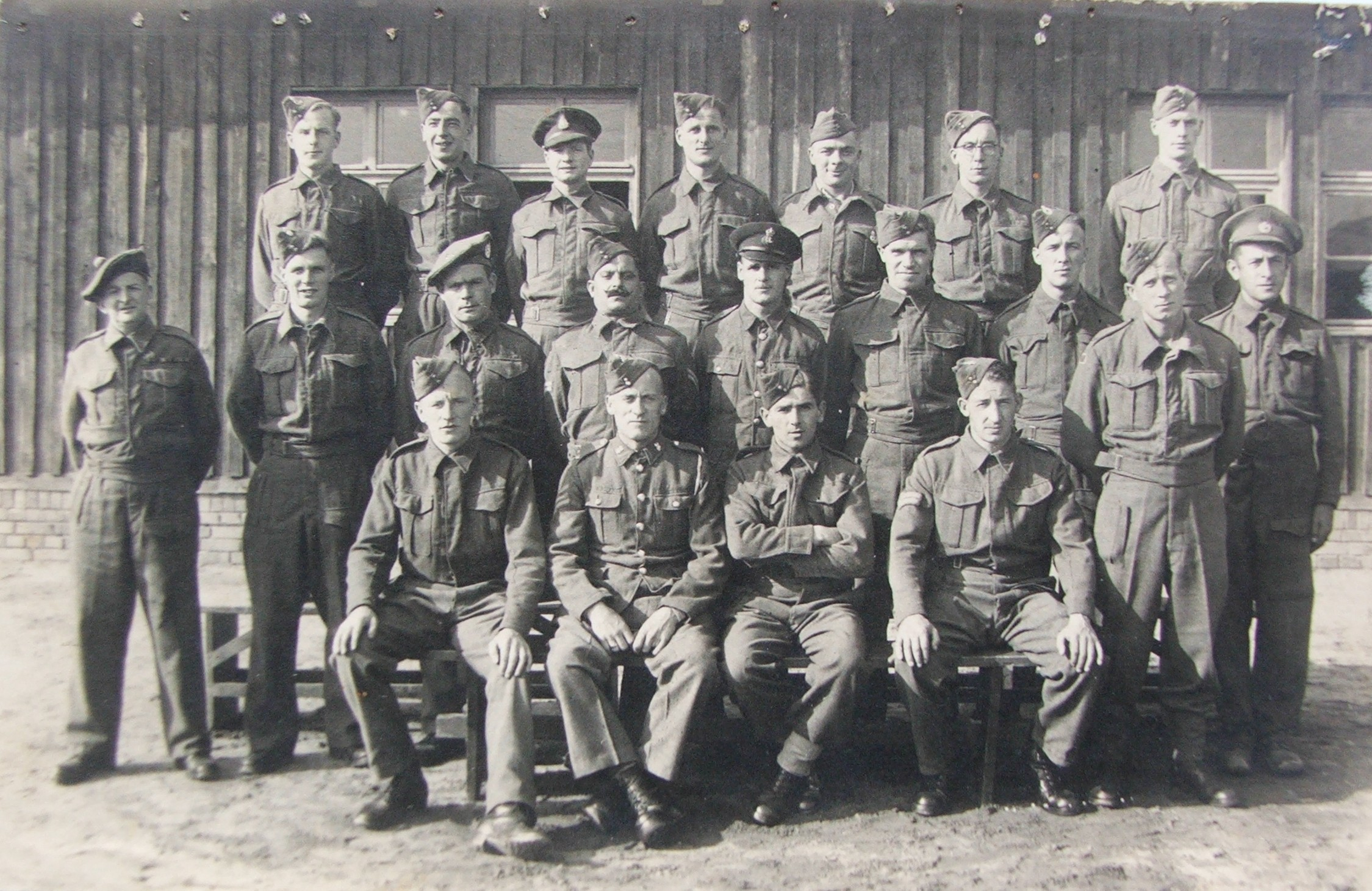
British prisoners of war in Stalag VIII-B

Altogether, throughout World War II more than 300,000 Allied prisoners passed through the camp, between 40,000 and 100,000 of them died. Among them were Poles, Belgians, Frenchmen, Britons, Yugoslavs, Greeks, Soviets, Americans, Romanians, Italians, Australians, Canadians, New Zealanders, Dutchmen and South Africans. Most of those who perished are buried in mass graves in the nearby village of Klucznik and at the local cemetery.

In October 1944, soldiers and officers were brought here from the Warsaw Rising, including over 1,000 women. Later, most of them were transferred to other camps.

In January 1945, the Germans divided the POWs into groups of 200 to 300 and marched them westwards. After the Soviet takeover of the area, on 17 March 1945 the Red Army took the camp over and continued to operate it, this time the institution housed German prisoners of war.

A transit camp, run by the Ministry of Internal Security and commanded by Czesław Gęborski (later put on trial for crimes against humanity for his actions in the camp), was also created nearby, serving as an internment, labor and resettlement camp for German Silesians, as a "verification" point for Silesians, as well as a camp for veterans of the Anders' Polish II Corps, whom the new communist authorities of Poland saw as "dangerous." Out of 8,000 internees, it is estimated that between 1,000 and 1,500 German civilians died in the camp, mostly by typhus and maltreatment. More than 1,130 names are listed in the cemetery. The camp was the most infamous one in Silesia, known for rape and mistreatment.

== Memorial ==
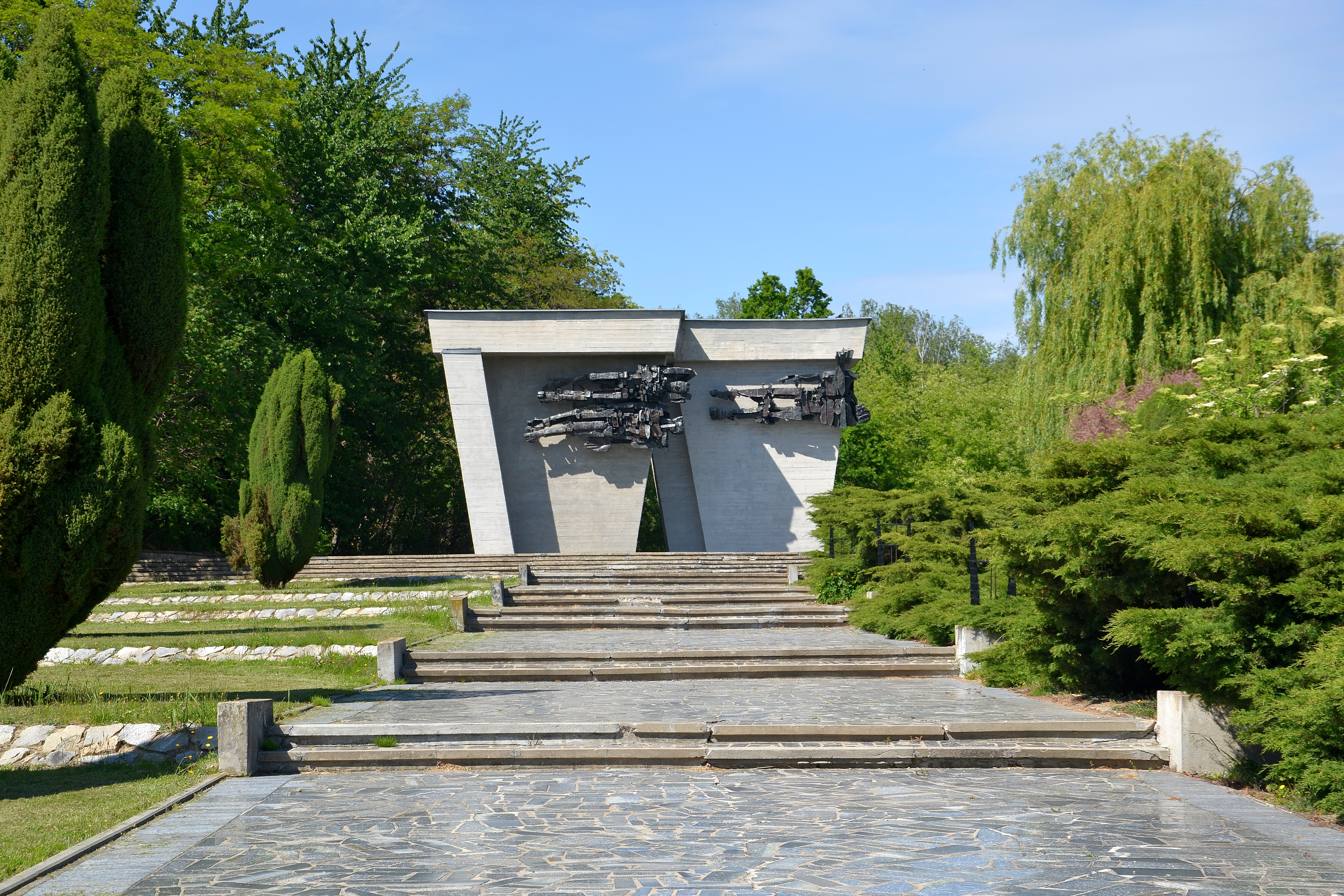
Memorial to the victims

The memory of the inmates of the camps is preserved by a large monument devoted to all the victims of the camp, as well as the Central Prisoner of War Museum, the only such institution in Poland and one of very few in the world.
