= Jaworzno concentration camp =

German concentration camp in Poland during World War II

Coordinates: 50.21342°N 19.23936°E

The Jaworzno concentration camp was a concentration camp in the Second World War, German-occupied Poland and later in Communist Poland. It was first established by the Nazis in 1943 during WWII and was later used by the Soviet NKVD in 1945 to 1956. After that it was used by the Ministry of Public Security and other agencies of the Polish communist regime. Today the site is an apartment complex and also houses a memorial to the camp's victims.

It was established as a Nazi concentration camp called SS-Lager Dachsgrube ("SS Camp Dachsgrube) also known as Arbeitslager Neu-Dachs ("Work Camp Neu-Dachs") during World War II by the Third Reich in the territory of German-occupied Poland in Jaworzno, Lesser Poland. The camp operated under the Nazi German administration from June 1943 until their evacuation in January 1945.

After the communist takeover of Poland, the camp was reinstated and ran by the Soviet Union first and then by the People's Republic of Poland till 1956, mainly to imprison the local German population, who had formed the region's majority population. During this period, it was renamed as the Central Labour Camp in Jaworzno (Centralny Obóz Pracy w Jaworznie, COP Jaworzno).

== During the German occupation of Poland ==
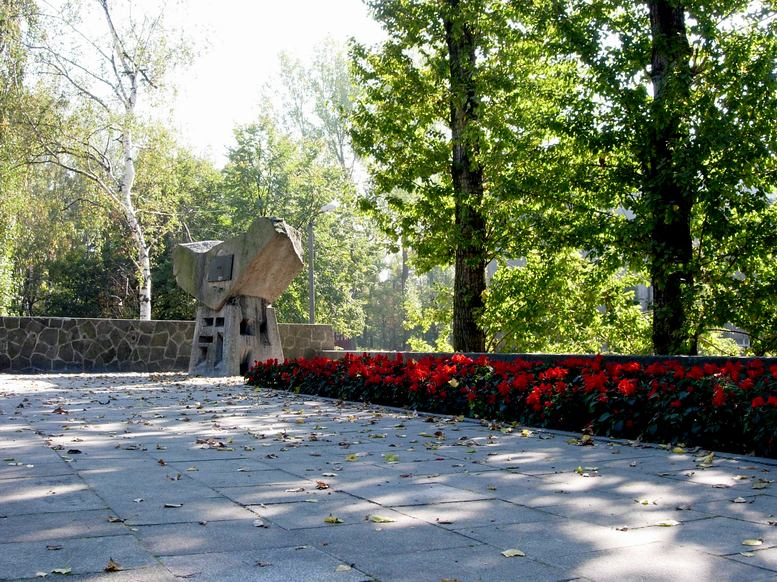
Labor camp Neu-Dachs memorial in 2006

The Nazi concentration camp at Jaworzno was opened on June 15, 1943, as one of many subcamps of the Auschwitz concentration camp. The camp, known as SS-Arbeitslager Neu-Dachs (often also called SS-Lager Dachsgrube), provided forced labor for the German war industry. Inmates were primarily employed in coal mining in Jaworzno, and in the construction of the power plant "Wilhelm" (renamed "Jaworzno I" after the war) for Albert Speer's company EnergieVersorgung Oberschlesien AG (EVO). Among the builders of the camp were British prisoners of war from the Stalag VIII-B at Lamsdorf (Łambinowice). The camp's guard unit of about 200 to 300 SS personnel was composed mostly of the ethnic German Volksdeutsche from occupied Poland and other countries, led by camp commandant Bruno Pfütze and his deputy Paul Weissman.

There were up to 5,000 inmates imprisoned in the camp at any given time. There were various nationalities of prisoners, mainly European Jews (about 80% of all inmates). By the time the camp began its operations, the local Jews of Jaworzno (a population of about 3,000 before the war) and of the rest of Poland had already been mostly exterminated. There were also Poles, Germans and other nationalities, as well as Soviet prisoners of war. There were 14 reported successful escapes, including several Soviet POWs who then joined the local Polish communist partisans. The camp's survival rate was low due to its terrible conditions. This included starvation, disease, hard labour and brutality. About 2,000 people lost their lives in the Jaworzno camp. Some of the prisoners were murdered by German civilian employees of the coal mine, mostly members of the paramilitary organization SA), who had been tasked with overseeing the prisoners at work. Every month about 200 inmates who were unable to work anymore, were taken by truck from Jaworzno to the gas chambers at Auschwitz II-Birkenau, resulting in several thousand more deaths.

On the night of January 15, 1945, the camp was bombed by the Soviet Air Force as the front approached. The camp was evacuated two days later on January 17. At the last roll-call, the number of inmates was established at 3,664. The SS executed about 40 prisoners who were unfit for transport and about 400 others were left behind alive. Approximately 3,200 prisoners were marched away on a route leading them 250 km westward. Hundreds of them died on the way to the Gross-Rosen concentration camp in Lower Silesia, including about 300 who were shot dead in a massacre which occurred on the second night of this death march. In all, about 9,000 to 15,000 Auschwitz system prisoners perished during the evacuation marches. The abandoned camp was infiltrated on January 19, 1945, by the local unit of the Polish resistance organization Armia Krajowa (AK). 350 prisoners were still alive when the Soviet Red Army forces arrived there a week later. Commandant Pfütze was killed later in 1945.

== Stalinist era ==
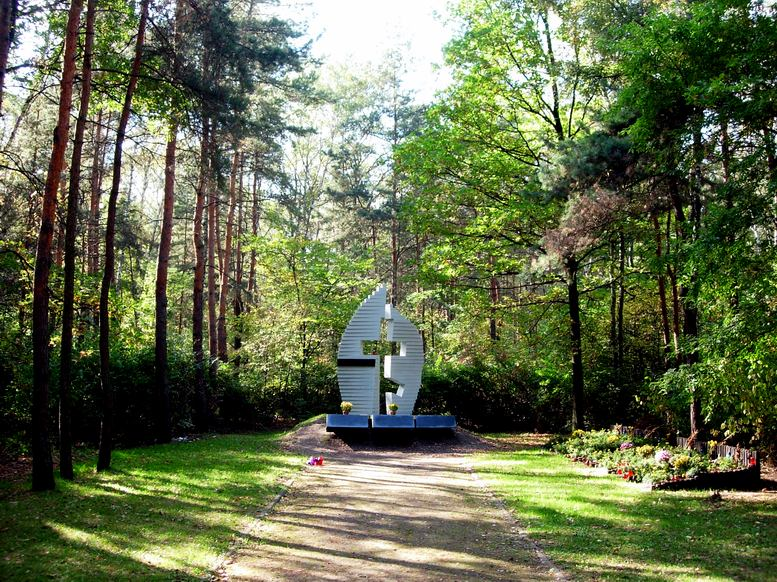
Central Labour Camp Jaworzno memorial

Since February 1945, the camp had served the Soviet NKVD and then the Polish Ministry of Public Security (UB) as a prison camp for the so-called "enemies of the nation" (Polish: wrogowie narodu). Some of them were German military POWs who were members of the Waffen-SS that were imprisoned separately from the rest. The prisoners were made up of Nazi collaborators from all over Poland. Most were local Germans from German Upper Silesia, Germans from Polish Upper Silesia, and Silesian civilians from Jaworzno, the nearby Chrzanów and elsewhere. Prisoners included women and children. There were also ethnic Poles who were arrested for their opposition to Stalinism, including members of the Polish non-communist resistance organizations AK and BCh and later the anti-communist organization WiN. The camp for Germans was run until 1949, when the last of them were allowed to leave and emigrate from their home region to post-war Germany.

In April 1945, the camp was renamed to the "Central Labor Camp" (COP) as part of a centralized effort to create COPs.) The German inscription "Arbeit macht frei" ("Work makes free") was replaced by Polish "Praca uszlachetnia człowieka" ("Work enables man"). The prisoners mostly worked on the construction site of the Jaworzno power plant or in nearby factories and mines. All of them were imprisoned in separate subcamps and were guarded by more than 300 soldiers and officers from the Internal Security Corps. The soldiers were aided by about a dozen civilian personnel. One of the commandants (from 1949), was a Polish Jew and communist named Salomon Morel, who had gained a reputation for cruelty in the Zgoda labour camp in Świętochłowice. Others included Włodzimierz Staniszewski, Stanisław Kwiatkowski and Teofil Hazelmajer who all answering to Jakub Hammerschmidt, later known as Jakub Halicki. Soviet NKVD officer Ivan Mordasov was also commandant of the camp. There were two satellite subcamps located at Chrusty and Libiąż.

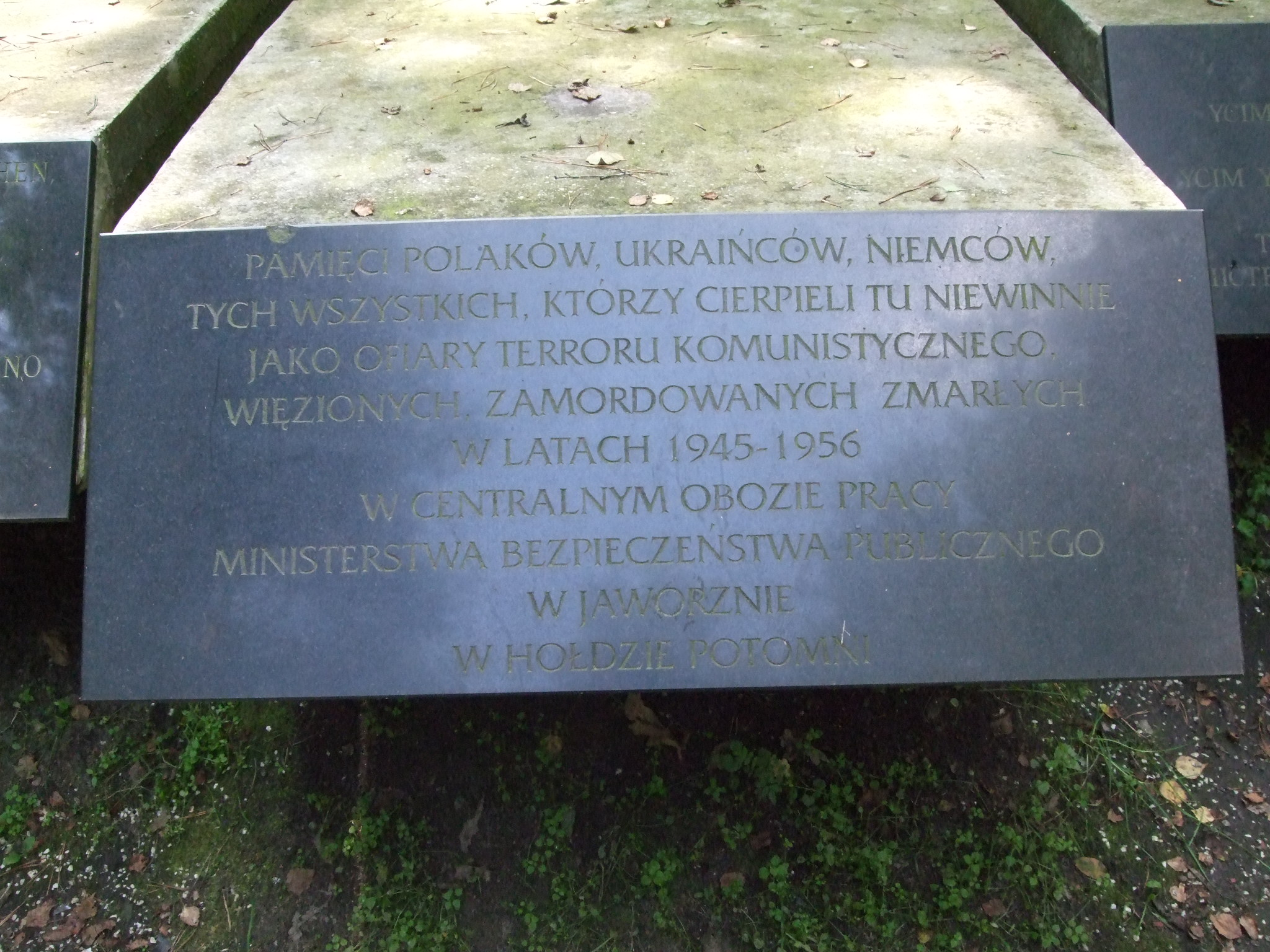
The COP Jaworzno memorial plate in Polish, located to between the German and Ukrainian plates

A separate subcamp existed for the ethnic Lemko and Ukrainian prisoners. On April 23, 1947, by a decree of the Political Bureau of the Central Committee of the Polish Workers' Party, COP Jaworzno was selected for the detention of civilians during the Operation Vistula deportation campaign. The first transportation of 17 prisoners from Sanok reached the special subcamp of Jaworzno on May 5 and the number of these prisoners eventually came 4,000, including over 700 women and children. The vast majority of them arrived in 1947. Most of them were people suspected of being sympathetic towards the rebels of the Ukrainian Insurgent Army (UPA) and those otherwise selected from the Operation Vistula transports. This included more than 100 Lemko intelligentsia and 25 Greek Catholic priests. The Lemko and Ukrainian prisoners were gradually released from spring of 1948 until spring of 1949 when the last of them left Jaworzno. Most of them were deported to new places of settlement or freed and allowed to return to their homes. Several hundred were sent to military prisons. At least 161 died in the camp.

According to incomplete official statistics from the period, 1,535 people died at COP Jaworzno between 1945 and 1947. 972 of these prisoners died of a typhus epidemic in the overcrowded camp out of at least 6,140 who died during this period in all camps and prisons in Poland. Contemporary figures are much higher. According to research conducted by Polish historians on the data released by the prison services in 1993, the list of prisoners who died at COP Jaworzno and its affiliations between 1945 and 1956 consists of 6,987 names, which is a figure much greater than in any other Polish detention centre. In comparison, approximately 2,915 prisoners died at the second most lethal work camp in Stalinist Poland, the Central Labour Camp in Potulice, mainly from typhus and dysentery. The victims were mostly the German Volksdeutsche.

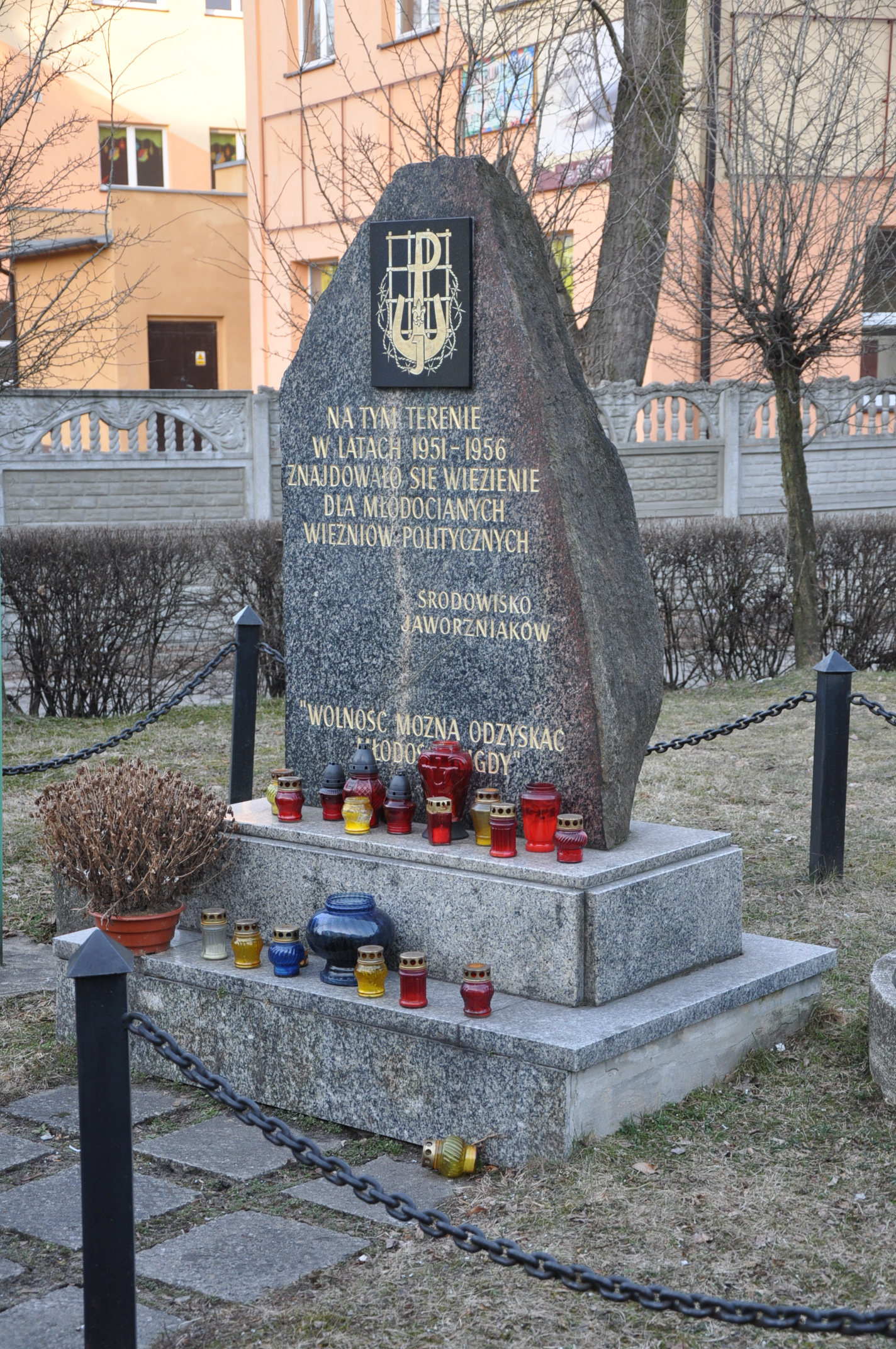
Memorial to the adolescent political prisoners 1951-1956

After Operation Vistula was concluded in 1949, the camp continued to be used as a prison for Polish political prisoners. Between 1951 and 1956, it was turned into the "progressive prison for adolescents" (Polish: Progresywne Więzienie dla Młodocianych) under the age of 21. Some 15,000 people passed through it as inmates, imprisoned in better conditions than the previous batches of prisoners. Their forced labour was accompanied by indoctrination and education. The camp's final closure took place during the wave of general post-Stalinist reforms, following a prison revolt in 1955, a riot sparked by an incident of an escaping prisoner that was killed.

== Aftermath ==
The former camp was converted into an apartment complex, the brick barracks forming housing and educational buildings (a primary musical school and a kindergarten, as well as a house of culture). As of 2012, residents still lived in the complex. A memorial dedicated in Polish to "the victims of Hitlerism 1939-1945" was erected on the site of the January 1945 mass execution of prisoners by the SS.

After the fall of communism in Poland, the monument was joined by a small commemorative plinth to the inmates of the political prison in the nearby primary school grounds. On May 23, 1998, Polish and Ukrainian Presidents Aleksander Kwaśniewski and Leonid Kuchma opened another memorial, dedicated in three languages to "all German, Polish and Ukrainian victims of communist terror who died or were murdered" in the camp. This was erected on the previously unmarked mass grave site in a nearby forest.

== See also ==
- List of subcamps of Auschwitz

== Literature ==
- (in Polish) Jerzy Zwiastowski and others, Jaworzno: Zarys dziejów w latach 1939-1990, Kraków 1996
- (in Polish) Kazimierz Miroszewski, Zygmunt Woźniczka, Obóz dwóch totalitaryzmów. Jaworzno 1943-1956, Jaworzno 2007
