= John Sack =

American journalist (1930–2004)

John Sack (March 24, 1930 – March 27, 2004) was an American literary journalist and war correspondent. He was the only journalist to cover each American war over half a century.

== Biography ==
Sack was born in New York City and graduated from Harvard College in 1951. His work appeared in such periodicals as Harper's, The Atlantic, Esquire and The New Yorker. He was a war correspondent in Korea, Vietnam, Iraq, Afghanistan and the former Yugoslavia.

A reporter, researcher and later a stringer for CBS News in Spain, he authored ten books, including the controversial title An Eye for an Eye: The Untold Story of Jewish Revenge Against Germans in 1945, which described alleged cases of persecution of Germans by Jews in post–World War II Polish internment camps.

== Death ==
He died on March 27, 2004, three days after his 74th birthday, from prostate cancer in San Francisco, California, according to his New York Times obituary. He was survived by a sister, Lois Edelstein.

== Publications ==
- 1952: The Butcher: The Ascent of Yerupajá New York: Rinehart & Co. Library of Congress Catalog Card Number 52-7159
- 1959: Report from Practically Nowhere OCLC 1321371
- 1968: M. New York: Avon Books. ISBN 0380698668 Reissued in 1986 by Corgi Children's.
- 1971: Lieutenant Calley: his own story; [as told to] John Sack. New York: Viking Press. ISBN 0670428213
  - 1971: Body count: Lieutenant Calley's story; as told to John Sack. London: Hutchinson, 1971. ISBN 0091110408
- 1982: Fingerprint. New York: Random House ISBN 0-394-50197-7
- 1993: An Eye for an Eye. New York, NY: BasicBooks (about Lola Potok Ackerfeld Blatt) ISBN 0465022154
- 1995: Company C: the real war in Iraq. New York: William Morrow; ISBN 0-688-11281-1
