= Zgoda labour camp =

Polish concentration camp

Coordinates: 50°16′46″N 18°54′03″E

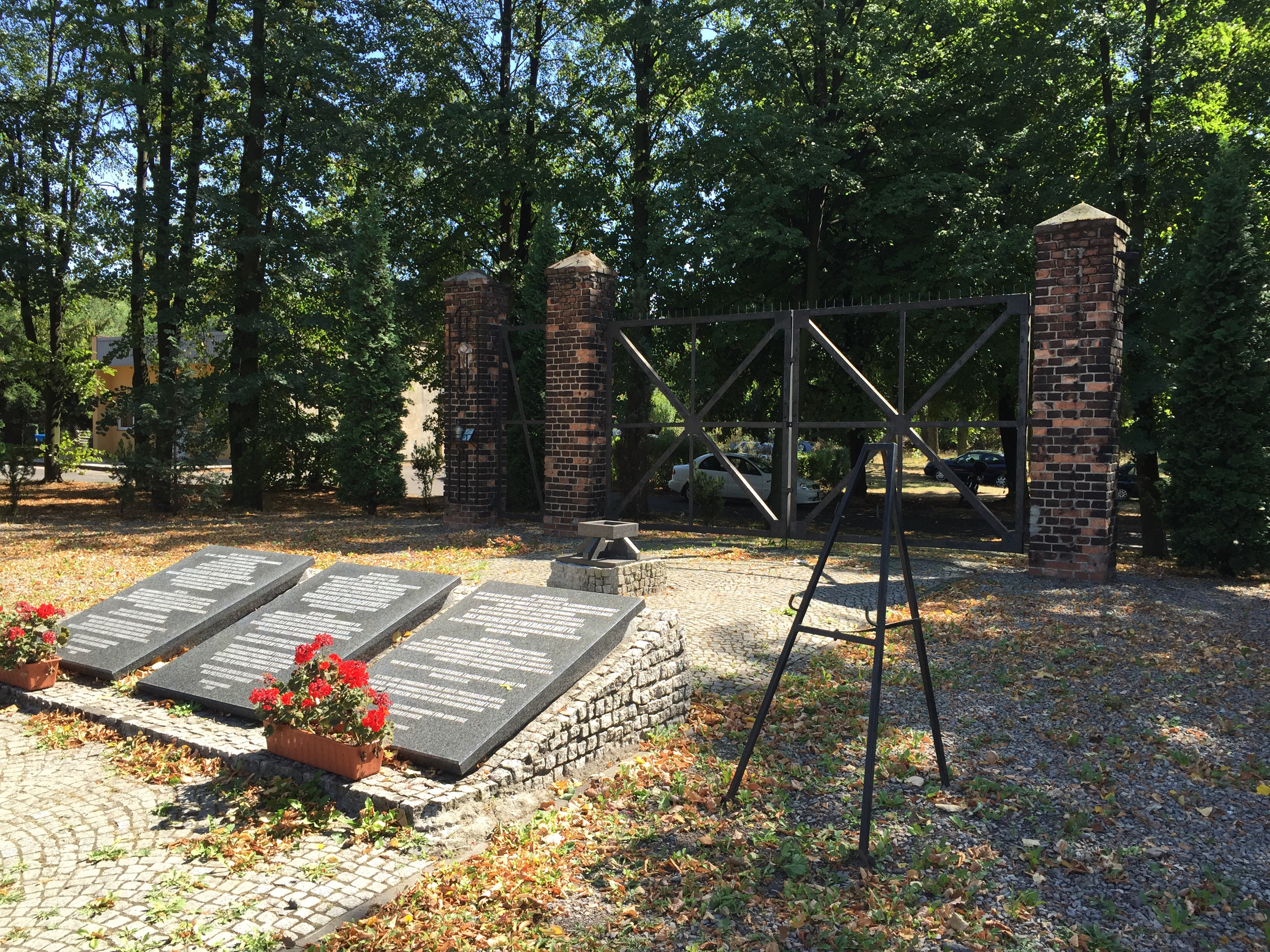
Camp Zgoda main gate and monument

Zgoda (Polish pronunciation: [ˈzɡɔda]) was a concentration camp established in February 1945 in the Zgoda district of Świętochłowice, Silesia. It was controlled by Poland's Ministry of Public Security (secret police) until its closure in November the same year.

During World War II, between 1943 and January 1945, the camp in Świętochłowice had been operated by Nazi Germany as an Arbeitslager – a labor subcamp (Arbeitslager Eintrachtshütte) or Eintrachthütte concentration camp – of the Auschwitz Nazi concentration camp. After the NKVD's transfer of the facility to Poland's Ministry of Public Security, Colonel Salomon Morel had become commander of the renamed Zgoda camp on 15 March 1945.

== Zgoda Labour Camp operation ==
The Nazi German camp was evacuated by the Germans before 23 January 1945. However, its infrastructure was left intact and after a few weeks the camp was restored by the NKVD, disinfected, and repopulated in February 1945 with Silesian prisoners from Kattowitz/Katowice, Bielitz/Bielsko and Neisse/Nysa. It continued to be used until November of the same year, under the jurisdiction of the Ministry of Public Security of Poland. It was one of several camps of this type in Silesia, the main one being the Jaworzno concentration camp (but Jaworzno outside of Silesia).

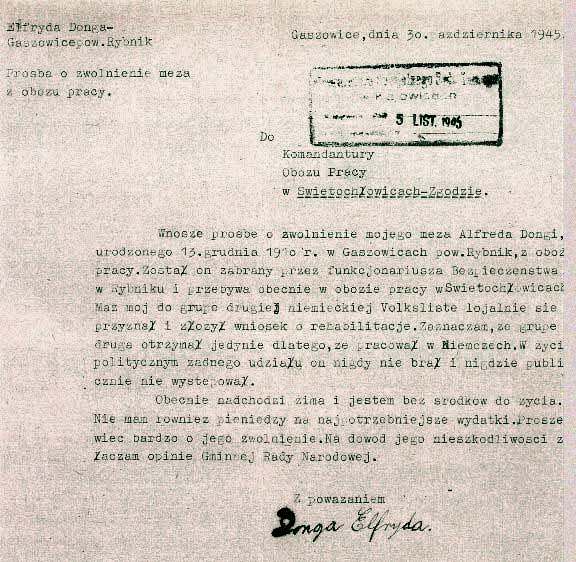
A plea by a woman (written in Polish) asking for the release of her husband from Zgoda. He was a civilian from Upper Silesia forced to sign a DVL list and sent to Nazi Germany for slave labor (from the IPN archives)

Following World War II, the communist authorities of Poland decided that the Silesian Volksdeutsche from the German DVL groups I and II were to be considered ethnically German. They were believed to have willingly collaborated with the Nazi regime in Upper Silesia during the war and were the subject of the judiciary. People who signed or were compelled to sign the Nazi lists III and IV were freed from this procedure providing they swore an oath of loyalty to the Polish state. The decision to treat Silesian prisoners as Germans were motivated by prior dealings with the Volksdeutsche from the Nazi General Government, and did not take into account local conditions under which the population found themselves on DVL lists, often unwillingly. The policy was changed in 1946, and the criteria were no longer based on Volksdeutsche list number, but on specific actions of individual prisoners during the Nazi occupation of Poland.

About 6,000 persons were imprisoned at the Zgoda camp, 1/3 of them Germans (1,733 in August 1945 along with those from Upper Silesia). The first inmates were sent there by militia, security services and the Soviet NKVD. Some families took children with them to the camp, but such cases were marginal and concerned a few mothers who did not want to leave their children alone. Statistics and witness statements speak of about 2 mothers with children below 1 to 5 years of age and perhaps 2 or 3 children 6 or 7 years old. This was a violation of a directive by the Security Department that forbade admitting prisoners along with children below 13 years old, who were ordered to be handed over to state care instead.

Most camp inmates were over 40 years old. The majority consisted of Silesians from the Volksliste category I and II as well as ethnic Germans, with some ethnic Poles and at least 38 inmates of other nationalities. Women made up 17% of the camp prisoners in June 1945, but their number went down later (from 716 to just over 300). There was also a large group of people above 60 years old. Among the incarcerated were former Nazi Party members, including those with the rank of Ortsgruppenleiter, for instance several dozen Nazis from Prudnik and Głubczyce. Some inmates have been sentenced by the courts for criminal acts during Nazi occupation of Poland, one was sentenced for four years for oppressing the Polish population during the war.

== Death toll ==
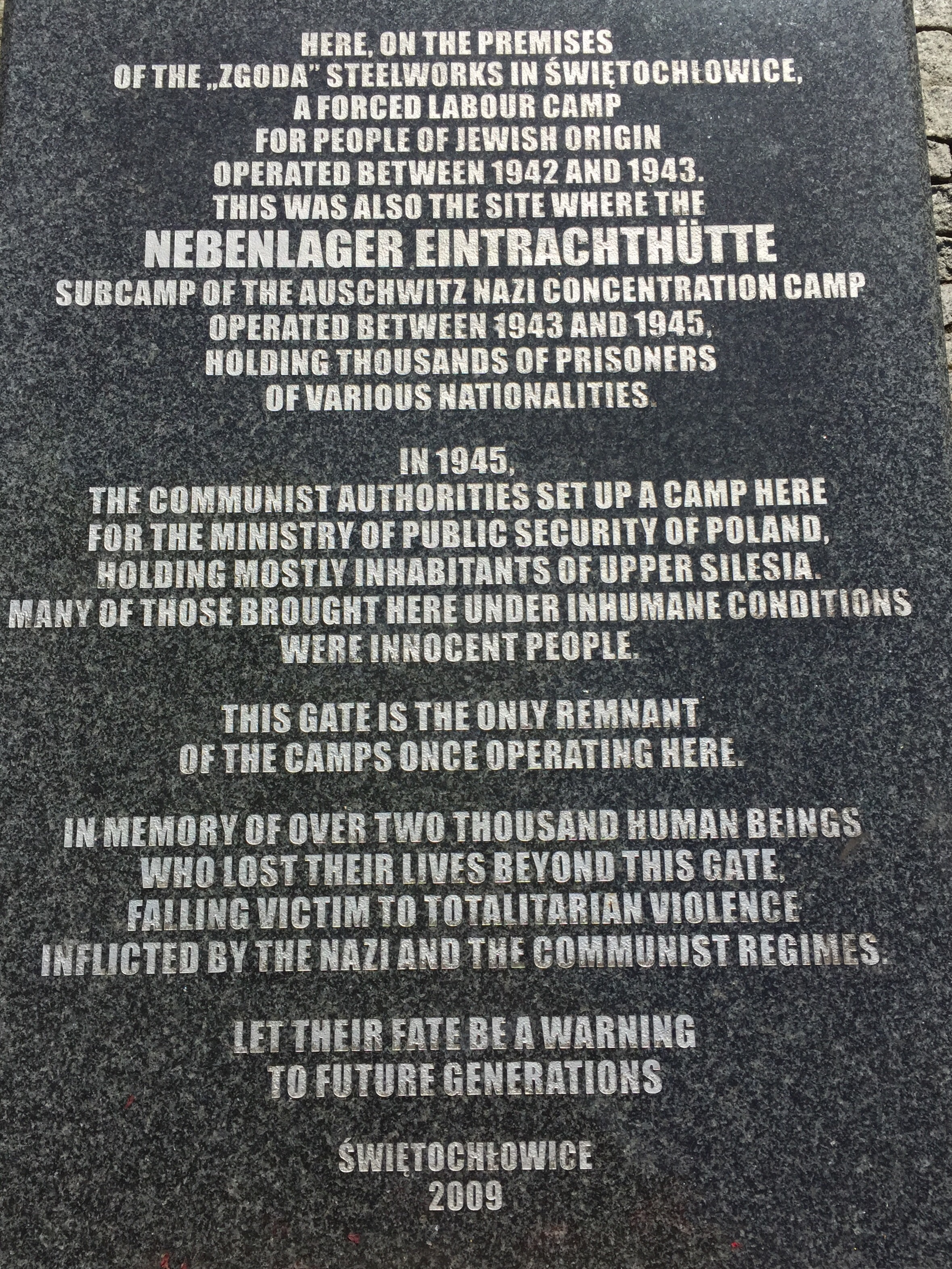
Memorial plate

Documented figures show that 1,855 prisoners lost their lives at Zgoda camp from February until November 1945. Most died during the typhus epidemic, that reached its highest death toll in August, claiming 1,600 victims. No medical help was offered to prisoners, and no action taken, until the epidemic spread across the entire camp. The bodies of the dead were being piled up on carts at night and taken outside the camp to hastily dug out mass graves. Eventually, a medical team was sent in, which vaccinated the remaining population.

The inmates were systematically maltreated and tortured by the guards including by Morel himself, who used to make pyramids of beaten prisoners (up to six layers high) causing suffocation. The camp was one of the cruelest Stalinist detention facilities in Silesia where communist crimes recognized by international law as crimes against humanity were being committed against the Silesian prisoners under the command of only two men, Aleksy Krut, and Salomon Morel who was running the camp alone from June 1945. He did not inform his superiors about the typhus epidemic until the news of the situation was reported by the local newspapers. He notified the local prosecutor, who in response ordered that no new prisoners be sent to the camp. For his negligence and for allowing the epidemic to take its toll, as well as for the failure to uphold his duties as commander of the camp, Morel was punished by a three-day house arrest and temporary reduction of pay by 50%. In his defence, Morel claimed that the camp was overcrowded and most of the inmates arrived already sick and that the camp administration left him with no means to stop the disease. His statements, however, were contradicted by official records. He was also reprimanded by the prosecutor for failing to send back to prison detainees who had arrest warrants issued against them, and instead keeping them in the camp.

The Zgoda camp was closed in November 1945 based on general order of the Minister of Security Stanisław Radkiewicz, issued 15 September 1945. The paper instructed to resolve all cases of detention of persons without prosecutor sanctions issued upon them. According to Morel, the camp was no longer needed. Almost all the remaining prisoners were released. However, they first had to sign an oath, under the penalty of prison, to never disclose the events witnessed in the camp. For years, the history of the camp lived exclusively in the memories of its former prisoners and their families, carefully hidden for fear of repressions for revealing how the native people of Silesia were treated.

== Legacy ==
The 2017 Polish film Zgoda, directed by Maciej Sobieszczański, is set at the concentration camp. The same year, Polish journalist Marek Łuszczyna published a book, Mała zbrodnia. Polskie obozy koncentracyjne ("The little crime: Polish concentration camps") about Zgoda and other Polish concentration camps that operated after the war.

Maciej Świrski of the Polish League Against Defamation brought a lawsuit against Newsweek.pl for a 2017 article reviewing Łuszczyna's book in which it referred to Zgoda as a "Polish concentration camp". Świrski argued that, because the camp was initially established by Soviet authorities, it should be described as a "communist labor camp". In 2018, a court ruled in his favor and Newsweek.pl had to publish an apology stating that there was no such thing as Polish concentration camps. However, Zgoda is described as a concentration camp by Gazeta Wyborcza, Die Zeit, Deutschlandfunk, and other sources. The guards at the camp were mostly Polish and they forced non-Polish speaking prisoners to learn Polish songs and Catholic prayers.

== See also ==
- List of concentration and internment camps
