= Suchdol nad Odrou =

- Market town
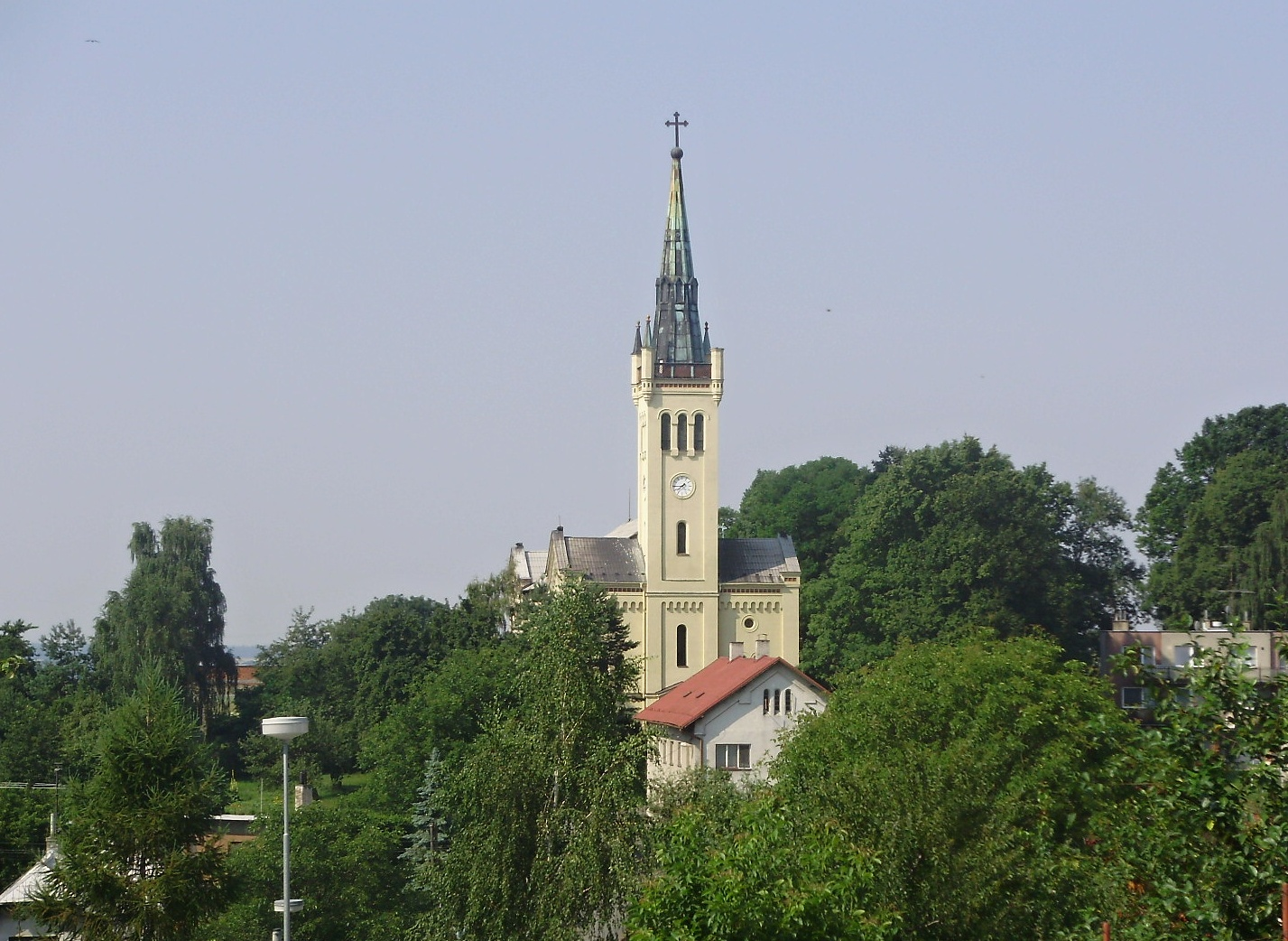
- Protestant church

- Flag Coat of arms

- Location in the Czech Republic
- Coordinates: 49°39′21″N 17°55′41″E
- Country: Czech Republic
- Region: Moravian-Silesian
- District: Nový Jičín
- First mentioned: 1257

Area
  - Total: 23.00 km^{2} (8.88 sq mi)
- Elevation: 272 m (892 ft)

Population (2026-01-01)
  - Total: 2,902
  - Density: 126.2/km^{2} (326.8/sq mi)
- Time zone: UTC+1 (CET)
  - Summer (DST): UTC+2 (CEST)
- Postal code: 742 01
- Website: www.suchdol-nad-odrou.cz

Suchdol nad Odrou (Czech pronunciation: [ˈsuɦdol ˈnat odrou]; German: Zauchtenthal, Zauchtel) is a market town in Nový Jičín District in the Moravian-Silesian Region of the Czech Republic. It has about 2,900 inhabitants.

== Administrative division ==
Suchdol nad Odrou consists of two municipal parts (in brackets population according to the 2021 census):

- Suchdol nad Odrou (2,341)
- Kletné (200)

== Geography ==
Odry is located about 9 kilometres (6 mi) northwest of Nový Jičín and 27 km (17 mi) southwest of Ostrava. It lies mostly in the Moravian Gate, but the municipal territory also extends into the Nízký Jeseník range in the north. The highest point is at 429 m (1,407 ft) above sea level. The Oder River forms the southern municipal border. The surrounding of the Oder belongs to the Poodří Protected Landscape Area.

== History ==
The first written mention of Suchdol is from 1257. The village was founded by Slavic settlers in the early 13th century. The population of German ethnicity gradually prevailed.

In the 18th century, 280 inhabitants left for Herrnhut, where they restored the Moravian Church and established mission settlements around the world.

== Demographics ==
Historical population

Year	Pop.	±%
1869	1,861	—
1880	2,192	+17.8%
1890	2,274	+3.7%
1900	2,364	+4.0%
1910	2,624	+11.0%

Year	Pop.	±%
1921	2,678	+2.1%
1930	2,853	+6.5%
1950	2,355	−17.5%
1961	2,650	+12.5%
1970	2,577	−2.8%

Year	Pop.	±%
1980	2,444	−5.2%
1991	2,491	+1.9%
2001	2,493	+0.1%
2011	2,508	+0.6%
2021	2,541	+1.3%

Source: Censuses

== Transport ==
The D1 motorway (section from Přerov to Ostrava) runs through the municipal territory.

== Sights ==
The most important monument is the Church of the Holy Trinity. It was built in the late Renaissance style in 1605–1614.

The Protestant church was built in the Neo-Romanesque style in 1852–1858.

== Notable people ==
- David Nitschmann (1695/96–1772), German missionary
- David Zeisberger (1721–1808), German missionary
- Bernard Rudofsky (1905–1988), Austrian-American architect
- Heinz Nawratil (1937–2015), German lawyer and author
