= Heinz Nawratil =

- Born: 18 June 1937; Suchdol nad Odrou, Czechoslovakia
- Died: 15 May 2015 (aged 77)
- Occupations: Lawyer, author and human rights activist

Heinz Gottfried Nawratil (18 June 1937 in Suchdol nad Odrou, Czechoslovakia – 15 May 2015) was a German lawyer, legal author and human rights activist.

After World War II Nawratil settled in Bavaria, West Germany, where he grew up in Miesbach. He studied law, earned a doctorate and worked as a civil law notary beginning in 1970. He was awarded the Förderpreis of the »Stiftung der Deutschen Gemeinden und Gemeindeverbände zur Förderung der Kommunalwissenschaften« in 1965. He is also known for his research on the expulsion of Germans after World War II, which has been criticized by German historian Martin Broszat (former head of Institute of Contemporary History in Munich) as "polemics with a nationalist-rightist point of view". Borszat wrote about Nawratil that he "exaggerates in an absurd manner the scale of 'expulsion crimes'".

== Selected publications ==
- BGB leicht gemacht, Ewald von Kleist-Verlag, 30th edition, 2008, ISBN 3-87440-210-X
- Der Kult mit der Schuld. Geschichte im Unterbewusstsein, Universitas Verlag, 3rd edition, 2006, ISBN 3-8004-1439-2
- Die deutschen Nachkriegsverluste unter Vertriebenen, Gefangenen und Verschleppten, Ullstein, 1986, ISBN 3-548-33066-5, Neuauflage Ares-Verlag, Graz 2008, ISBN 978-3-902475-49-7
- Die Vertreibung der Deutschen : unbewältigte Vergangenheit Europas, Bund der Vertriebenen, 1991, ISBN 3-925103-47-3
- HGB leicht gemacht, Ewald von Kleist-Verlag, 21st edition, 2007, ISBN 3-87440-206-1
- Schwarzbuch der Vertreibung 1945 bis 1948. Das letzte Kapitel unbewältigter Vergangenheit, Universitas Verlag, 14. Auflage 2007, ISBN 3-8004-1387-6
- Vertreibungsverbrechen an Deutschen. Tatbestand, Motive, Bewältigung, Ullstein, 5. Auflage 1987, ISBN 3-548-33084-3
- Die Versöhnungsfalle/Deutsche Beflissenheit und polnisches Selbstbewußtsein, München 2011, ISBN 978-3-8004-1497-0
