= Rape during the occupation of Manchuria =

World War II war crimes

Manchuria was in a state of anarchy following the Soviet invasion and subsequent occupation, compounded by the mass repartriation of Japanese civilians living in the region. During this period, a large number of Japanese women and girls were subject to mass rape by Soviet soldiers and local Chinese mobs. Korean and Chinese women were likewise raped by various perpetrators during the occupation.

The exact number of Japanese women and girls victimized remains uncertain due to a lack of official records. Western and Japanese academics estimate a higher number while Russian academics dismissed accounts of sexual violence committed by Soviet soldiers as small scale incidents relative to the size of the army. Professor Lori Watt places the highest figure between 30,000 and 40,000.

== Soviet invasion and occupation of Manchuria ==
Following the Soviet invasion of Manchuria on August 9, 1945, large numbers of Japanese citizens residing in the region sought to repatriate to Japan. The Supreme Commander for the Allied Powers oversaw this mass movement and, in October 1945, delegated responsibility to Japan’s Ministry of Health and Welfare.

The Kwantung Army, which was supposed to protect the Japanese settlers in Manchuria, quickly retreated and abandoned them. As most able-bodied men had been drafted into the army, the majority of Japanese civilians left behind were women, children, and the elderly, leaving them highly vulnerable to attacks by Soviet soldiers and local Chinese seeking revenge.

In Soviet-occupied Manchuria and North Korea, the repatriation of Japanese civilians was marked by violent expulsions, accompanied by widespread looting, mass killings, and mass rape perpetrated by both Soviet soldiers and local populations seeking revenge. A large number of Japanese civilians died due to starvation, disease, mass killings, and mass suicides. Approximately 223,000 Japanese civilians residing in the Soviet-occupied zones died, most of them within a year and a half after August 9, 1945.

Regarding the widespread rape of Japanese women and girls by Soviet soldiers, a former Japanese soldier, Wakatsuki Yoshio in his memoir, The Records of Postwar Repatriation, wrote:

What word can possibly describe the violence committed by the Soviet soldiers on Japanese women? I can only think of the word “hideous”. The victim could be a girl of twelve or thirteen years old or an old lady of almost seventy years old. These soldiers did not choose the sites where they raped them, in public, in broad daylight, even on snow-covered roads.

The Soviet invasion of Manchuria in 1945 left many Japanese women stranded after their male family members were either conscripted or killed. These women, including young girls, endured severe hardships, including gang rape by Soviet soldiers and local Chinese militia groups. In an effort to survive, many were forced to marry Chinese men, either out of necessity or in exchange for assistance in repatriating their remaining family members. Some victims were as young as thirteen.

Some victims were held in groups and subjected to repeated rape over an extended period. In some cases, to secure the safety of the group, women were offered to the perpetrators by the Japanese community. Some women were also reported to have voluntarily submitted themselves in an effort to protect their groups, families, or younger peers. After Japan's defeat in 1945, leaders of the Kurokawa Settler Group in Manchuria offered approximately 15 young women (aged 17–21) to Soviet soldiers in exchange for protection. This practice continued from September to November 1945, and some of the women were later offered to Chinese soldiers as well.

There were several instances in which Japanese refugees were attacked by Soviet forces and armed Chinese mobs, often resulting in mass killings and mass rape. One well-known example is the Gegenmiao massacre, where 1,800 Japanese refugees who had taken shelter in a Tibetan lamasery were attacked by Soviet troops and armed Chinese mobs. More than 1,000 civilians were reportedly raped and massacred during the massacre.

Beniya Torao, a Japanese orphan left behind in Manchuria, recalled what he had witnessed in a Japanese settlement attacked by Soviet forces:

Beniya saw a young mother with a baby on her back. Three Russian soldiers caught her. She begged them to save her life for the sake of the baby. The soldiers raped her right beside the crying baby. Afterward, the soldiers cut her belly with a bayonet and left. Her eyes were wide open and her guts were splashed out. Beniya brought the baby to her bosom. That was the only thing he could do for the baby.

According to former Korean ambassador to Norway, Choi Seok-shin, who was residing in Manchuria at the time of Japan's surrender, as soon as troops from the Soviet 6th Guards Tank Army entered Shenyang, following the surrender of the Japanese 63rd Division that had been defending the city, an orgy of killings, looting, rape, and assaults was carried out by Soviet troops and local Chinese. Some captured Japanese military police and officers were buried in the ground with only their heads exposed, after which they were stabbed to death by Soviet soldiers and Chinese mobs.

With no protection from Japanese soldiers, Japanese women often had to devise unique strategies to avoid rape. Memoirs from female repatriates describe various escape tactics. Some women hid in attics every night, narrowly avoiding capture or even bullets. Others managed to trap intruders in rooms before fleeing or bribed Soviet soldiers with valuables such as wristwatches to secure their escape. Some women, particularly former geisha and bar workers, voluntarily went with Soviet soldiers in an effort to protect others. These women were referred to as tokkōtai (kamikaze) for their sacrifice.

Not only Japanese women but also Korean and Chinese women were raped by various perpetrators in Manchuria. According to British and American reports, Soviet Red Army troops looted and terrorized the local population in Shenyang, a city in Manchuria. A foreign witness described how Soviet troops, previously stationed in Berlin, were allowed by the Soviet military to enter Shenyang "for three days of rape and pillage". In Harbin, Soviet forces ignored protests from Chinese Communist Party leaders regarding the widespread mass rape and looting carried out by Soviet troops.

Right after the end of the war in 1945, in Manchurian areas occupied by the National Revolutionary Army, 176 Koreans were killed, 1,866 were injured, 3,468 were detained, and 320 were raped by armed Chinese mobs. The reason for the Chinese attacks against Korean residents in Manchuria was believed to be the perceived Korean collaboration with Japanese colonial rule.

Armed Chinese groups swept through villages, looting food, money, and clothing while indiscriminately beating or killing those who resisted. They also raped women. Korean women tried to avoid rape by smearing their faces with soot or spending nights hiding in fields with their entire families, enduring mosquito bites.

== Japanese Government Response ==
The transportation of Japanese repatriates from Manchuria began in May 1946, with most arriving by late 1947. At each receiving port, the Ministry of Health and Welfare established regional repatriation offices.

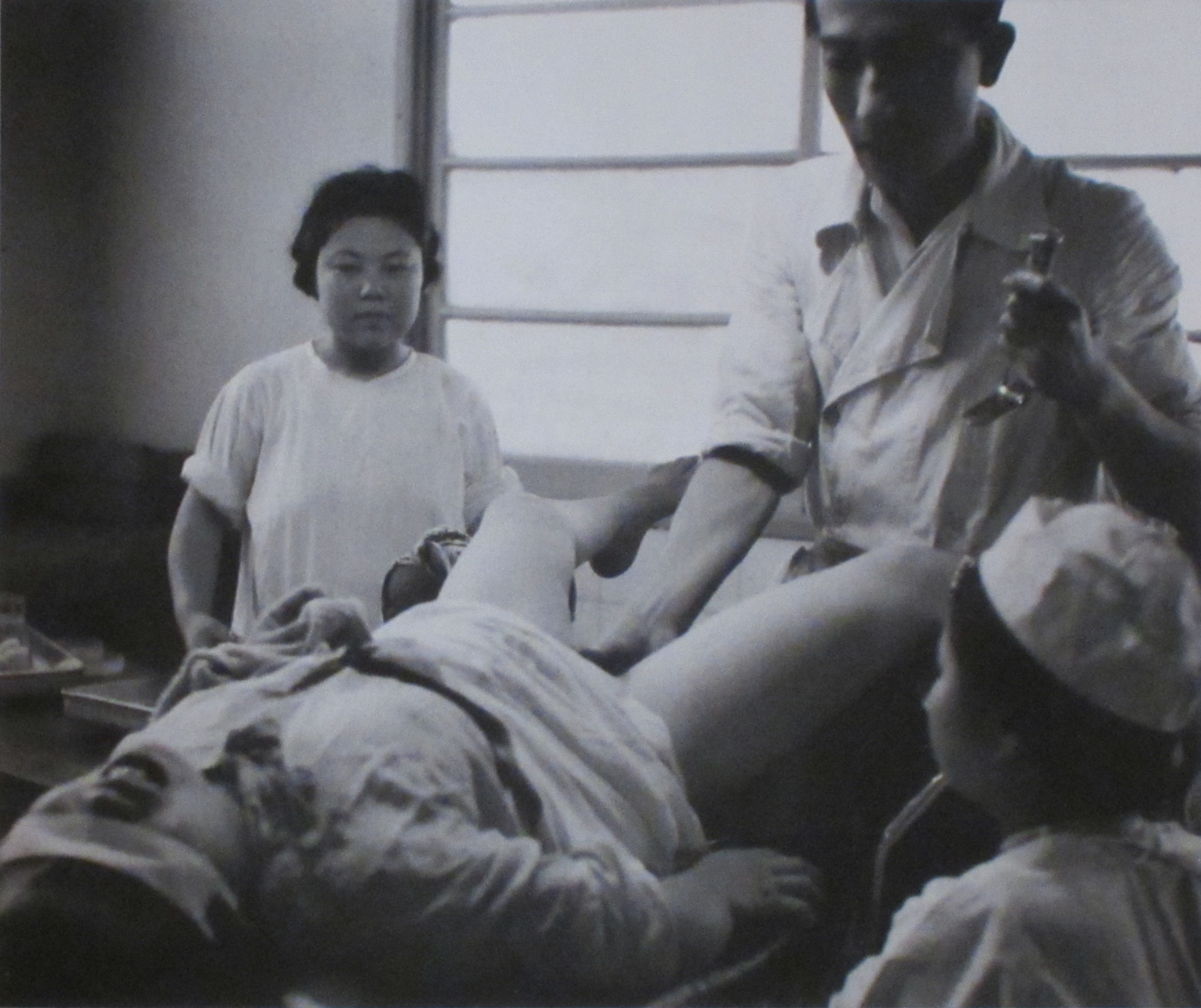
Abortion at Futsukaichi Sanatorium in 1947

Due to widespread violence against women in Manchuria, the Ministry issued Medical Order No. 151 in April 1946, mandating the establishment of medical facilities and female counseling offices for women in "extremely dire conditions." An appendix to the order instructed officials to perform abortions on women deemed unfit for "regular" labor, though the term "regular" was left undefined. At the time, abortion was largely prohibited under Japan’s penal code, with only a few limited exceptions. According to a former medical staff member at a repatriation center, the primary goals were to prevent venereal disease and to prevent the birth of children "contaminated by foreign blood." The medical order was believed to serve both public health concerns and the ethnocentric ideology of pre-war Japan, which emphasized maintaining the perceived biological "superiority" of ethnic Japanese.

Due to the strict confidentiality requirements outlined in the order, there is little recorded detail on the medical treatment of female repatriates who had experienced sexual violence, including the number of women affected, making the total number of Japanese women raped uncertain.

Japanese women returning from Manchuria were singled out for medical examinations upon arrival if they were over the age of fifteen. A government notice published in the Western Japan Newspaper on July 17, 1946, specifically urged women who suspected pregnancy or sexually transmitted infections to report to clinics. The state referred to pregnancies resulting from rape as "unlawful pregnancy", fearing that mixed-race children born from these assaults would threaten Japan’s postwar identity. Many of these women were subjected to forced, painful abortions without anesthesia.

In 1946, Hani Motoko, founder of Fujin no Tomo (Women's Friend) magazine and its readers' organisation, Tomo no Kai (Friendship Societies), was asked to support a government repatriation project. Members of Tomo no Kai from the Sasebo repatriation center were assigned to protect women, conduct screenings for sexually transmitted diseases, terminate pregnancies resulting from sexual violence, and provide vocational training for the victimized women. After two years of work at the repatriation center, the Sasebo Tomo no Kai received a certificate of appreciation from the government.

In the 1970s, Nishimura Fumiko, a representative of Tomo no Kai, testified that members had mixed feelings about carrying out their duties:

Because we are mothers beyond national boundaries, we had very complex emotions toward those lives (lost by abortions)…I have never forgotten it to this day.

The Futsukaichi Rest Home was also a specialized medical facility established by the Ministry of Health and Welfare in 1946 after World War II, which operated for 1.5 years, providing abortions and treatment for sexually transmitted diseases to rape survivors who had been repatriated from China or Korea. There were 218 cases of unlawful pregnancy, 87 cases of normal pregnancy, and 35 cases of venereal disease recorded at the Futsukaichi Rest Home. According to a report by Masaru Hashizume, the chief medical officer at the facility, within approximately two months of its full operation starting in April 1946, cases of unlawful pregnancies were documented based on the survivors' regions of repatriation. The breakdown of cases included 24 from North Korea, 14 from South Korea, 4 from Manchuria, and 3 from North China. The nationalities of the perpetrators were also recorded, with 28 identified as Korean, 8 as Soviet, 6 as Chinese, 3 as American, and 1 each from Taiwan and the Philippines.

Due to the Japanese government's special measures to eliminate unlawful pregnancies and control venereal diseases, there were hardly any children among the repatriates who were fathered by Soviet soldiers or local Chinese, despite the fact that a large number of Japanese women were raped by them.

However, over 10,000 of the Japanese women and girls who were taken as wives by Chinese men in 1945-1950 and did not return during 1946, stayed in China, had children with Chinese men and did not undergo abortions, and came back to Japan decades later with Chinese fathered children. Japanese women left behind in 1945, who were married to Chinese men and had children fathered by them started moving to Japan with their Chinese fathered children when China and Japan restored diplomatic relations. After requirements were eased in 1989 for migration more of them started moving to Japan. A Japanese girl named Suzuki Noriko who was left behind in China in 1945, had 5 Chinese fathered children after marrying a Chinese man. She and her youngest daughter in 1978 were the first to come back to Tokyo and then she brought her other children and Chinese husband to Japan after 2 years passed. Suzuki witnessed massacred and rapes of Japanese settlers by Soviets and Chinese civilians in 1945 and she personally had all her clothing stripped off by attackers and was beaten unconsciouss by Chinese, and she saw Japanese setttlers getting bayoneted by Soviet soldiers. Suzuki saw Russian women soldiers celebrated and laugh while watching a Japanese woman getting gang raped by Russian male soldiers.

== Social effects ==
During the war, the Japanese government classified women into two categories: faithful wives and mothers, who were protected by soldiers on the home front, and women who were sexually available to soldiers. Repatriated women from Manchuria, however, were not recognized as “proper” women but were instead labeled as “sexually deviant.” The primary function of their medical care was seen as a means of correcting these “deviant” women, transforming them into “proper” Japanese women by “removing the contamination attached to their bodies".

The issue of repatriated women from Manchuria has been met with widespread silence from the Japanese government, civil society, and the victims themselves. Although some media attention has emerged since the late 1970s, there has been no official political discussion or civil action on their behalf. The government has neither acknowledged its role in endangering these women through war-related policies nor recognized their victimization. Instead, it has continued to categorize women into "proper" and "sexually deviant" groups, a distinction that has largely gone unchallenged, even by later feminist movements. This gender ideology has reinforced the silence, despite occasional efforts to break it.

The experiences of Japanese women who were raped by Soviet soldiers in Manchuria remain largely undocumented, as none of the victims are known to have written a memoir. However, accounts of sexual violence committed by Soviet troops frequently appear in the writings of former Japanese settlers. This lack of documentation has also been attributed to the fact that many rape victims were murdered afterward or died from malnutrition and disease before they could return to Japan.

During the Soviet invasion of Manchuria in August 1945, widespread sexual violence against Japanese women was reported. Memoirs and historical accounts describe how women attempted to avoid rape by shaving their heads or dressing as Buddhist nuns. Sexual violence became a recurring theme in postwar Japanese narratives, with memoirs such as Fujiwara Tei’s "The Shooting Stars Are Alive" (1949) highlighting the suffering of Japanese civilians. These accounts contributed to a broader perception of Japan as a victim of Soviet aggression, reinforcing gendered narratives of defeat in which women symbolized national humiliation and men were depicted as powerless to protect them. The issue also fueled postwar anti-Soviet sentiment in Japan. However, historians have noted that these narratives largely focus on Japanese experiences, often overlooking the suffering of Korean, Chinese, and other women under Soviet occupation.

== See also ==
- Rape during the occupation of Japan
- Rape during the occupation of Germany
- Rape during the liberation of France
- Rape during the liberation of Serbia
- Rape during the Soviet occupation of Poland
- Gegenmiao massacre
- Tonghua incident
- Japanese settlers in Manchuria
- Evacuation of Manchukuo
- Japanese orphans in China
- Japanese evacuation of Karafuto and the Kuril Islands
- Flight and expulsion of Germans (1944–1950)
- Wartime sexual violence#Soviet Army
- Allied war crimes during World War II
- Soviet war crimes
- Japanese war crimes
- Futsukaichi Rest Home
- Recreation and Amusement Association
- So Far from the Bamboo Grove
- Elizabeth Saunders Home
