= Rape during the occupation of Japan =

Sexual crimes committed during the occupation of Japan

Allied and Japanese troops committed a number of rapes during the Battle of Okinawa during the last months of the Pacific War and the subsequent Allied occupation of Japan. The Allies occupied Japan until 1952 following the end of World War II and Okinawa Prefecture remained under US governance for two decades after.

Estimates of the incidence of sexual violence by Allied occupation personnel differ considerably. Some historians have written that there were a large number of sexual assaults and others that the number was low.

== Background ==
By 1945 U.S. troops were entering and occupying territory with a Japanese civilian population. On February 19, 1945, U.S. troops landed on Iwo Jima, and on April 1, 1945, on Okinawa. In August 1945, Japan surrendered and Allied occupation troops landed on the main islands, starting the formal occupation of Japan. The Allied occupation ended in most of Japan on April 28, 1952, but did not end in Okinawa until May 15, 1972, when the terms of the Treaty of San Francisco went into effect.

During the Pacific War, the Japanese Government frequently issued propaganda claiming that if the country was defeated, Japanese women would be raped and murdered by Allied soldiers. The government used this claim to justify orders to soldiers and civilians in areas which were invaded by Allied forces to fight to the death or commit suicide. Japanese civilians on Saipan committed mass suicide (including at Banzai Cliff and Suicide Cliff) in July 1944 as a result of this propaganda.

== Battle of Okinawa ==
According to Calvin Sims of The New York Times: "Much has been written and debated about atrocities that Okinawans suffered at the hands of both the Americans and Japanese in one of the deadliest battles of the war. More than 200,000 soldiers and civilians, including one-third of the population of Okinawa, were killed".

=== U.S. military rapes ===
There is no documentary evidence that mass rape was committed by Allied troops during the Pacific War. There are, however, numerous credible testimony accounts which allege that a large number of rapes were committed by U.S. forces during the Battle of Okinawa in 1945.

Okinawan historian Oshiro Masayasu (former director of the Okinawa Prefectural Historical Archives) writes:

Soon after the U.S. marines landed, all the women of a village on Motobu Peninsula fell into the hands of American soldiers. At the time, there were only women, children and old people in the village, as all the young men had been mobilized for the war. Soon after landing, the Marines "mopped up" the entire village, but found no signs of Japanese forces. Taking advantage of the situation, they started "hunting for women" in broad daylight and those who were hiding in the village or nearby air raid shelters were dragged out one after another.

According to Toshiyuki Tanaka, 76 cases of rape or rape-murder were reported during the first five years of the American occupation of Okinawa. However, he asserts this is probably not the true figure, as most cases were unreported.

Peter Schrijvers finds it remarkable that looking East Asian was enough to be in danger of rape by American soldiers, as for example happened to some of the Korean sex slaves that the Japanese had by force brought to the island. Schrijvers writes that "many women" were brutally violated with "not even the least mercy".

Marching south, men of the 4th Marines passed a group of some 10 American soldiers bunched together in a tight circle next to the road. They were 'quite animated', noted a corporal who assumed they were playing a game of craps. 'Then as we passed them', said the shocked marine, 'I could see they were taking turns raping an oriental woman. I was furious, but our outfit kept marching by as though nothing unusual was going on'.

Although reports of rape were largely ignored at the time due to lack of records, as many as 10,000 Okinawan women may have been raped according to an estimate from one Okinawan historian. It has been claimed that the rape was so prevalent that most Okinawans over age 65 around the year 2000 either knew or had heard of a woman who was raped in the aftermath of the war. US Military officials stated in 2000 that there is no evidence of mass rapes.

==== Katsuyama killing incident ====
According to interviews carried out by The New York Times and published by them in 2000, multiple elderly people from an Okinawan village confessed that after the United States had won the Battle of Okinawa three armed African American Marines kept coming to the village every week to force the villagers to gather all the local women, who were then carried off into the hills and raped. The article goes deeper into the matter and claims that the villagers' tale – true or not – is part of a "dark, long-kept secret" the unraveling of which "refocused attention on what historians say is one of the most widely ignored crimes of the war": "the widespread rape of Okinawan women by American servicemen".

When the Marines started to confidently carry out their weekly ritual unarmed, the villagers reportedly overwhelmed the men and killed them. Their bodies were hidden in the nearby cave out of fear for retaliation against the village, a village secret until 1997. Since the killings, the cave has been known by the locals as Kurombo Gama, which is translated either as "Cave of The Negros" or, less commonly, "Niggers' Cave" (Kurombo 黒んぼ is an ethnic slur referring to black people).

==== Silence about rape ====
Professor of East Asian Studies and expert on Okinawa Steve Rabson said: "I have read many accounts of such rapes in Okinawan newspapers and books, but few people know about them or are willing to talk about them". Books, diaries, articles and other documents refer to rapes by American soldiers of various races and backgrounds. Masaie Ishihara, a sociology professor, supports this: "There is a lot of historical amnesia out there, many people don't want to acknowledge what really happened".

An explanation given for why the US military has no record of any rapes is that few – if any – Okinawan women reported abuse, mostly out of fear and embarrassment. Those who did report them are believed by historians to have been ignored by the U.S. military police. A large scale effort to determine the extent of such crimes has also never been called for. Over five decades after the war has ended, the women who were believed to have been raped still refused to give a public statement, with friends, local historians and university professors who had spoken with the women instead saying they preferred not to discuss it publicly. According to a Nago, Okinawan police spokesman: "Victimized women feel too ashamed to make it public".

In his 1992 book Tennozan: The Battle of Okinawa and the Atomic Bomb, George Feifer noted that by 1946 there had been fewer than 10 reported cases of rape in Okinawa. He explains that it was: "partly because of shame and disgrace, partly because Americans were victors and occupiers". Feifer argued: "In all there were probably thousands of incidents, but the victims' silence kept rape another dirty secret of the campaign".

According to Feifer in his 2001 book The Battle of Okinawa: The Blood and the Bomb, the majority of the likely thousands of rapes were committed in the north, where the campaign was easier and the American troops were not as exhausted as in the south, and it was mostly troops landed for occupation duty who committed rapes. Almost all rape victims were silent about what had happened to them, which helped to keep the rapes a "dirty secret" of the Okinawa campaign. The main reasons for the women's silence and the low number of reported rapes was the American role as victor and occupiers, and feelings of shame and disgrace. Of the approximately 10 rapes that were formally reported by 1946, almost all were connected to "severe bodily harm".

Several factors contributed to few telltale American rape-induced pregnancies coming to term; many women had become temporarily infertile due to the stress and malnutrition, and some who did become pregnant managed to abort before their husbands returned. In interviews, historians and Okinawan elders said that some Okinawan women who were raped did give birth to biracial children, but that many of them were immediately killed or left behind out of shame, disgust or fearful trauma. More often, however, rape victims underwent crude abortions with the help of village midwives.

=== Japanese Army rapes ===
According to Thomas Huber from the United States Army Combined Arms Center, Japanese soldiers also mistreated Okinawan civilians during the battle there. Huber writes that rape was "freely committed" by Japanese soldiers who knew that they had little chance of surviving due to the Imperial Japanese Army (IJA) prohibitions against surrender. These abuses contributed to a post-war divide between Okinawans and mainland Japanese.

=== Official American policy and Japanese civilian expectations ===
Having historically been a separate nation until 1879, Okinawan language and culture differ in many ways from that of mainland Japan, where they often were discriminated against and treated in the same manner as Chinese and Koreans.

In 1944 heavy American air-bombings of Naha had left 1,000 dead and 50,000 homeless and sheltering in caves, and US naval bombardments contributed additionally to the death toll. During the Battle of Okinawa between 40,000 and 150,000 residents died. The survivors were put in internment camps by Americans.

During the fighting some Japanese troops mistreated Okinawan civilians, for example taking over the caves they sheltered in and forcing them out into the open, as well as killing some directly whom they suspected of being American spies. During the last months of desperate fighting they were also unable to supply the Okinawan population with food and medicine.

Japanese propaganda about American atrocities had led many Okinawan civilians to believe that when the Americans came they would first rape all the women and then kill them. At least 700 civilians committed suicide. The Americans also provided food and medicine, something the Japanese had been unable to do. In view of the propaganda claiming that American policy would be rape, torture and murder, the Okinawans were often surprised at "the comparatively humane treatment". Over time, Okinawans would become increasingly despondent with the Americans, but at the time of surrender the American soldiers were less vicious than had been expected.

== Post-war ==
=== Allied and Japanese governance ===
The victorious Allied powers created the Supreme Commander for the Allied Powers (SCAP), which was headquartered in Tokyo. During the Occupation SCAP was the supreme legal authority in Japan. Unlike Germany, the Japanese government (including the police and central bank) was not dismantled. The Japanese government created a Central Liaison Office or CLO to liaise with SCAP.

=== Public fear and other psychological factors ===
In the period after the Emperor of Japan announced that Japan would surrender, many Japanese civilians feared that Allied occupation troops were likely to rape Japanese women when they arrived. The Japanese Government and the governments of several prefectures issued warnings recommending that women take measures to avoid contact with occupation troops, such as staying in their homes and staying with Japanese men. Police in Kanagawa Prefecture, where the Americans were expected to first land, recommended that young women and girls evacuate the area. Several prefectural authorities also suggested that women kill themselves if they were threatened with rape or raped and called for "moral and spiritual education" to enforce this view.

In his The "Rape" of Japan: The Myth of Mass Sexual Violence During the Allied Occupation (2024), Brian Walsh makes the following observations of Japanese public opinion and culture, all of which made many Japanese susceptible to believe unverified allegations of mass rape:

- Japanese veterans were well aware of the IJA's sexual violence in China and elsewhere, and assumed that the Allied occupational soldiers would behave in a similar manner. During the occupation, many Japanese people saw the good behavior of the occupiers as "some sort of trick" and assumed that while they saw no mass rapes such crimes must be happening elsewhere, or would happen in the future after more disciplined American units were rotated out of the country and replaced.
- Most Japanese men and some Japanese women saw the Allied orders to grant legal equality to women – first ordered on 11 October 1945 – and the ending of licensed prostitution on 21 January 1946 (which the Americans came to see as debt-based sexual slavery and a human rights violation) as attacks on the traditional Japanese view of masculinity.
- Japanese men saw the acts of kindness directed to Japanese women and children by the victorious American servicemen as a repudiation of their stern bushido code, and thus as additional attacks on their masculinity. Japanese men were not treated as well, with American servicemen constantly showing them varying signs of contempt in the early days of the occupation.
- Many Japanese used rape and castration as metaphors for non-sexual interactions with Americans, including negotiations with SCAP, delousing with DDT, (Note: "Nosaka Akiyuki...recalled GIs working with Japanese medical personnel...to rid Japan of typhus and other infectious diseases by using DDT to delouse literally anyone they could get their hands on. In Nosaka's recollection. the DDT pump was like a horse's penis, violating him, intruding into this clothes, and leaving humiliating and telltale white deposits all over his body") and the overall postwar US-Japan strategic relationship.

=== Recreation and Amusement Association ===
In response to fears of mass rape, the Japanese government established the Recreation and Amusement Association (RAA), military brothels to cater to the Allied troops upon their arrival, though most professional prostitutes were unwilling to have sex with Americans due to the impact of wartime propaganda. Some of the women who volunteered to work in these brothels claimed that they did so as they felt they had a duty to protect other women from Allied troops.

The establishment of RAA facilities negatively impacted the perception of Japanese women among U.S. soldiers, leading some to view them as "readily available for sex." Japanese women working in RAA facilities were particularly vulnerable to rape. In Yokohama, over a hundred U.S. soldiers broke into an RAA facility and raped 14 women working there. Japanese police witnessed the assaults but took no action.

These officially sponsored brothels were ordered closed in January 1946 when the Occupation authorities banned all "public" prostitution while declaring that it was undemocratic and violated the human rights of the women involved. The closure of the brothels took effect a few months later, and it was in private acknowledged that the main reason for closing down the brothels was the huge increase in venereal diseases among the soldiers.

=== Rapes by U.S. forces ===
==== Incidence ====
Assessments of the incidence of rape by American occupation personnel differ.

John W. Dower has written that while the R.A.A. was in place "the incidence of rape remained relatively low given the huge size of the occupation force". Dower wrote: "According to one calculation, the number of rapes and assaults on Japanese women amounted to around 40 daily while the R.A.A was in operation, and then rose to an average of 330 a day after it was terminated in early 1946". According to Dower, "more than a few incidents" of assault and rape were never reported to the police.

Ian Buruma states that while it is likely that more than 40 rapes took place each day, "most Japanese would have recognized that the Americans were far more disciplined than they had feared, especially in comparison to the behaviour of their own troops abroad".

According to Terèse Svoboda "the number of reported rapes soared" after the closure of the brothels, and she takes this as evidence that the Japanese had been successful in suppressing incidents of rape by providing prostitutes to the soldiers. Svoboda gives one example where R.A.A. facilities were active but some not yet ready to open and "hundreds of American soldiers broke into two of their facilities and raped all the women".

In contrast, Brian Walsh states that while the American occupation forces had a criminal element and many rapes occurred, "there is no credible evidence of the mass rape of Japanese women by American soldiers during the occupation", and claims that such occurrences are not supported by the available documentation. Instead, he writes that both Japanese and American records demonstrate that rapes were uncommon, and the incidence was no greater than that in contemporary American cities and actually lower than the incidence seen at the same time among American soldiers in Germany (though the German incidence later became similar to that in Japan following a sharp decline in June 1945). Walsh states that while there was a "brief crime wave" during the early phase of the occupation, consisting mainly of thefts (either outright or forced exchange of items after SCAP demonetized its newly issued military scrip at the behest of the Japanese government) and assaults on police (to steal their weapons, mainly as souvenirs), "there was, relatively speaking, little rape" during this period based on reported cases. Walsh states that there were 1,100 reported cases of sexual violence by Allied troops throughout the 7 year occupation period, though he admits this figure likely understates the actual incidence given that many rapes are never reported. Walsh noted that the estimates given by Dower and several others would mean that "the U.S. Occupation of Japan would have been one of the worst occurrences of mass sexual violence in the history of the world" with more than 700,000 rapes, something which, he claims, is not supported by the documentary evidence.

Similarly, Michael S. Molasky, Japanese literature, language and jazz researcher, states in his study of Japanese post-war novels and other pulp literature, that while rape and other violent crime was widespread in naval ports like Yokosuka and Yokohama during the first few weeks of occupation, according to Japanese police reports, the number of incidents declined shortly after and were not common on mainland Japan throughout the rest of occupation.

Up until this point, the narrative's events are plausible. American soldiers stationed abroad did (and still do) commit abduction, rape, and even murder, although such incidents were not widespread in mainland Japan during the occupation. Japanese police records and journalistic studies indicate that most violent crimes committed by GIs occurred in naval ports such as Yokosuka during the first few weeks after the Americans arrived in 1945, and that the number declined sharply thereafter. The above passage from Chastity also points to issues which are central to a serious consideration of prostitution in postwar Japan: for example, the collaboration between police and medical authorities in enforcing a regime or discipline against women working outside the domestic sphere, the economic exploitation of female labor through regulated prostitution, and the patriarchal valorization of chastity to an extent that rape victims are left few alternatives but prostitution or suicide".

However, Liam Thomas Edwards in his work: A Case of Sexual Misconduct: Gender Dynamics, Cultural Hegemony, and the United States Military in the Pacific, 1945–Present, argues that American occupying forces in Japan engaged in widespread sexual violence, rather than it being limited to a few isolated incidents. He criticizes Brian Walsh for downplaying the extent of sexual misconduct committed by American forces in Japan. While Edwards acknowledges Walsh's claim that some estimates of the number of rapes may have been exaggerated, he argues that Walsh fails to adequately account for factors such as underreporting, censorship, and the military's suppression of reports, all of which may have obscured the true scale of the violence. Edwards further asserts that Allied soldiers committed sexual assault in Japan with "a highly troubling frequency." (Note: Edwards' 2021 criticism of Walsh's October 2018 article Sexual Violence During the Occupation of Japan (The Journal of Military History) predates Walsh's later and better documented 2024 book The "Rape" of Japan: The Myth of Mass Sexual Violence During the Allied Occupation)

Illegal acts committed by the Allied occupation forces were neither severely punished nor widely reported in the media, resulting in limited public awareness. In September 1945, GHQ issued the Press Code to regulate newspaper publications, restricting coverage of such incidents. As a result, accurate statistics on sexual violence, including rape, during the early occupation period remain unclear. Historian Fujime Yuki states that in the first month after the occupation forces arrived, at least 3,500 women were raped, marking what she describes as "the beginning of the U.S. military's sexual violation of Japanese women." In 1946, there were 301 reported cases, followed by 283 in 1947, 265 in 1948, 312 in 1949, 208 in 1950, 125 in 1951, and 54 in 1952. A total of 1,548 cases were officially reported during the entire occupation period. However, Fujime argues that these figures likely represent only a fraction of the actual number, as they account only for reported incidents.

==== Incidents ====
The first reported case of rape by American soldiers in Japan occurred on 30 August 1945.

According to an observer who witnessed the formal surrender ceremony aboard the USS Missouri on 2 September 1945, later that day General Douglas MacArthur called a meeting to address reports of rape cases involving U.S. Marines in Japan.

Walsh mentions one "shocking allegation" of a gang rape perpetrated by 27 American soldiers that was reported directly to SCAP on 3 September 1945 by the Japanese government's Central Liaison Office (CLO).

On 4 September 1945, Japan’s Home Ministry issued a notice to police departments titled “Measures Regarding Illegal Acts by American Soldiers.” The document described a growing pattern of offenses committed by U.S. military personnel, including assaults on police officers, theft, unauthorized seizure of weapons from police stations, vehicle theft, and looting of private homes. Japanese authorities viewed many American soldiers as acting beyond the control of both local law enforcement and civilian authority. Among these offenses, acts of sexual violence against Japanese women were considered especially serious.

Yuki Tanaka relates that in Yokohama, the capital of Kanagawa Prefecture, there were 119 known rapes in September 1945.

At least seven academic books and many other works state that there were 1,336 reported rapes during the first 10 days of the occupation of Kanagawa Prefecture. Walsh states that this figure originated from Yuki Tanaka's 1996 book Hidden Horrors, and resulted from that author misreading the crime figures in their source. The source was a 15 September 1945 letter from Lieutenant General Arisue Seizo to SCAP General Headquarters which stated that the Japanese Government recorded 1,326 (1,336 is apparently a transcription error) criminal incidents of all types involving American forces for a 12 day period (not 10), of which an unspecified number were rapes; Lt. Gen Arisue also wrote "We believe it is a matter of mutual congratulation to be able to inform you that, as a result of sincere and adequate steps taken by you, there has been a distinct decrease in the number of unfortunate incidents which have frequently taken place in the early part of the occupation of the Allied Forces... In regard to the nature of these incidents, the classification would run in the order of looting of Arms, robbing of articles, appropriation of automobiles, robbing money and others. The total amount of damages are more than 420 rifles, 65 revolvers, and 170 automobiles." Walsh cites another document Shinchugun no Fuho Koi which claims 7 rapes reported in Kanagawa Prefecture for this 12 day period.

Historians Eiji Takemae and Robert Ricketts state that "When US paratroopers landed in Sapporo, an orgy of looting, sexual violence and drunken brawling ensued. Gang rapes and other sex atrocities were not infrequent" and some of the rape victims committed suicide. In contrast, Walsh quotes an undated Sapporo police report which stated "The advance of the American army into Hokkaido was more tranquil than in other locales" as further evidence that mass rapes were not observed but were assumed to be happening elsewhere.

According to Terèse Svoboda there are two large events of mass rape recorded by Yuki Tanaka at the time that the R.A.A. brothels were closed down in 1946:

- According to Tanaka, close to midnight on April 4, an estimated 50 GIs arriving in 3 trucks assaulted the Nakamura Hospital in Omori district. Attacking at the blow of a whistle, over the period of one hour they raped more than 40 patients and an estimated 37 female staff. One of the raped women had a two-day-old girl that was killed by being thrown on the floor, and also some male patients who tried to protect the women were killed.
- According to Tanaka, on April 11, between 30 and 60 U.S. soldiers cut phone lines to a housing block in Nagoya city, and simultaneously raped "many girls and women between the ages of 10 and 55 years".

Walsh argues that these two events originated in pornographic fiction written by Goto Tsutomu aka Goto Ben (both are valid renderings of the Japanese written characters) and then copied almost word for word by Tanaka.

Walsh cites American documentation of the abduction and rape of a 10 year old Tokyo girl by two American servicemen as evidence that negates the charge that the Occupation authorities countenanced sexual violence:

The "doctor's preliminary report stated that she was badly torn and lost considerable blood." In fact, one of the most damning pieces of evidence against the culprits is that one of them had blood on his trousers that matched the girl's blood type and neither of theirs. There was also a considerable amount of blood pooled in the back seat, where a blood-soaked undershirt was also found. All of the blood matched the girl's blood type. Investigators also identified her fingerprint on the car...

Heinous as this crime was, we know about it precisely because Occupation authorities took it very seriously. They liaised with Japanese police, identified that these men were likely the same two who had been involved in an earlier disturbance at a teahouse, used that information to identify the vehicle that they used, called in forensic examiners to dust for fingerprints and determine blood type, got someone to administer a lie-detector test, and extracted a complete confession from one of the subjects...The seriousness with which American authorities treated sexual violence was undoubtedly one reason that the rate of sexual violence during the Occupation was low, especially in comparison to that of other occupying armies in the mid-twentieth century.

In numerous reported cases in Yokosuka and Tateyama, U.S. soldiers committed rape and attempted rape against Japanese women who were alone in their homes, either at gunpoint or under the pretense of offering money. Sexual violence also occurred in situations where only women were present. Even in government offices and other public places, women who were alone were targeted for rape and harassment. In Musashino, elementary school students were gang raped. Although U.S. military regulations clearly stipulated that soldiers committing illegal acts could be subject to punishment, cases of sexual violence continued to occur, prompting Japanese authorities to implement measures to address the issue.

==== Yamata incident ====
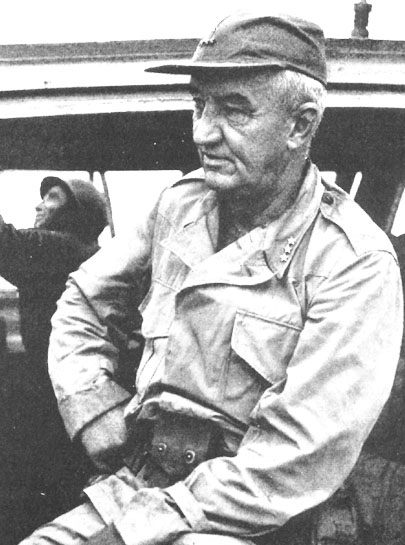
Robert L. Eichelberger recorded his troops' suppression of a Japanese vigilante group.

General Robert L. Eichelberger, the commander of the U.S. Eighth Army in Japan during 1945-1948, recorded that in the one instance when some Japanese formed a vigilante group on the pretense of protecting women from off-duty GIs, the Eighth Army ordered armored vehicles in battle array into the streets and arrested the leaders, who received long prison terms. Walsh maintains this occurred in Yamata and that the only source for this account is Eichelberger's diary, which does not mention any sex crimes but does mention the beatings of several Americans, two severely.

==== 1950 Kokura incident ====
The Kokura incident (小倉黒人米兵集団脱走事件) was a mass rape event by mutinous American soldiers of the 24th Infantry Regiment against Japanese women in the city of Kokura in July 1950, during a riot against deployment to Korea.

On 11 July, 1950 in Kokura, 75, 100, 200, or 250 soldiers of the US 24th Infantry Regiment which was at Camp Jōno and ordered to deploy into the Korean war rioted and escaped their camp and went on a raping spree in Kokura against Japanese women and killed a Japanese man. “Testimony revealed in the 1975 Fukuoka Prefectural edition of the Asahi suggests that some women were sexually assaulted in front of their husbands.” The mass rapes being committed by the US soldiers on Japanese women were mentioned in a US military police report to the Fukuoka Area Provost Marshal, chief of Kyushu Civil affairs region, on 17 July 1950.

=== Rapes by Commonwealth forces ===
Members of the British Commonwealth Occupation Force (BCOF), which consisted of Australian, British, Indian and New Zealand forces, also committed rapes while stationed in Japan. The officer in charge of the BCOF's official reports reported that BCOF members were convicted of committing 57 rapes from May 1946 to December 1947 and a further 23 between January 1948 and September 1951. No official statistics on serious crimes committed by BCOF members during the BCOF's first three months in Japan (February to April 1946) are available. Australian historian Robin Gerster contends that while the official statistics underestimate the level of serious crime committed by BCOF members, Japanese police often did not pass reports they received on to the BCOF and that serious crimes which were reported were properly investigated by BCOF military policemen. The penalties given to members of the BCOF convicted of serious crimes were "not severe", however, and those imposed on Australian servicemembers were often mitigated or quashed by Australian courts. He also argues that rapes committed by Australian soldiers were common, driven by both a perception of Japan's open attitude toward sexuality and a sense of revenge for Japanese war crimes. He asserts that this contributed to the BCOF's reputation as the least disciplined of the Allied occupation forces. It is estimated that thousands of Japanese women were raped after the war, some of whom were raped by Australian and New Zealander soldiers who were part of the British Commonwealth Occupation Force in Japan.

According to Takemae and Ricketts, a former Japanese prostitute recalled:

Most of the people in Kure stayed inside their houses, and pretended they knew nothing about the rape by occupation forces. The Australian soldiers were the worst. They dragged young women into their jeeps, took them to the mountain, and then raped them. I heard them screaming for help nearly everynight. A policeman from the Hiroshima police station came to me, and asked me to work as a prostitute for the Australians—he wanted me and other prostitutes to act as a sort of ʻfirebreak,ʼ so that young women wouldn't get raped. We agreed to do this and contributed greatly.

Allan Clifton, an Australian military officer who acted as interpreter and criminal investigator wrote in his 1951 book Time of Fallen Blossoms:

I stood beside a bed in hospital. On it lay a girl, unconscious, her long, black hair in wild tumult on the pillow. A doctor and two nurses were working to revive her. An hour before she had been raped by twenty soldiers. We found her where they had left her, on a piece of waste land. The hospital was in Hiroshima. The girl was Japanese. The soldiers were Australians. The moaning and wailing had ceased and she was quiet now. The tortured tension on her face had slipped away, and the soft brown skin was smooth and unwrinkled, stained with tears like the face of a child that has cried herself to sleep.

In regard to the treatment of Australian servicemembers at courts-martial, Clifton wrote regarding another rape that was witnessed by a party of card-players that:

At the court martial that followed, the accused was found guilty and sentenced to ten years penal servitude. In accordance with army law the courts decision was forwarded to Australia for confirmation. Some time later the documents were returned marked 'Conviction quashed because of insufficient evidence'".

=== Allied censorship of Japanese media ===
American Occupation authorities imposed wide-ranging censorship on the Japanese media from 10 September 1945 until the end of the occupation in 1952, including bans on covering sensitive social issues and serious crimes committed by members of the Occupation forces.

According to Donald Keene:

Not only did Occupation censorship forbid criticism of the United States or other Allied nations, but the mention of censorship itself was forbidden. This means, as Donald Keene observes, that for some producers of texts "the Occupation censorship was even more exasperating than Japanese military censorship had been because it insisted that all traces of censorship be concealed. This meant that articles had to be rewritten in full, rather than merely submitting XXs for the offending phrases".

—Dawn to the West

==== Allied censorship begins September 10, 1945 ====
According to Eiji Takemae and Robert Ricketts, Allied Occupation forces suppressed news of criminal activities such as rape; on September 10, 1945, the Supreme Commander of the Allied Powers (SCAP) "issued press and pre-censorship codes outlawing the publication of all reports and statistics 'inimical to the objectives of the Occupation'".

According to Teresa Svoboda the Japanese press reported cases of rape and looting two weeks into the occupation, to which the Occupation administration responded by "promptly censoring all media". However, Walsh states that the press reported few cases of rapes before the censorship began. For instance, the final article which included any discussion of rapes by Allied forces in the Asahi Shimbun (published on 11 September 1945) stated that none had taken place.

The U.S. military censored all mention of the 1950 Kokura incident rapes in Japanese media.

Following the occupation, Japanese magazines published accounts of rapes committed by American servicemen.

== In literature ==
Rape committed by American soldiers in occupied Japan is depicted in volume 4 of Barefoot Gen.

A novel was written based on the 1950 Kokura incident by a Japanese man from Kokura, Seichō Matsumoto. (Note: Duchess Harris wrote an essay “How negative stereotypes in material culture impact global politics”, criticising Matsumoto's novelisation for focusing on race in the incident, saying “The image of the Black GI as rapist has become something of a staple in Japanese pornography and films about the Occupation. The Black rapist trope also appears in Matsumoto Seicho’s short story, Kuroji no e.” Others also criticised his racial focus."●イーストウッドに「黒地の絵」の映画化を Eastwood should make a film adaptation of "The Black Picture"". Ameblo. 2 April 2015.)

== See also ==
- Wartime sexual violence
- 1995 Okinawa rape incident
- Allied war crimes during World War II
- Elizabeth Saunders Home
- Amerasians in Japan
- Rape during the occupation of Manchuria
- Rape during the occupation of Germany
- Rape during the liberation of France
- Rape during the liberation of Serbia
- Rape during the Soviet occupation of Poland
- Rape in Japan
- Special Comfort Facility Association
- American mutilation of Japanese war dead
- Japanese war crimes
- United States war crimes
- Futsukaichi Rest Home
