= Rape during the liberation of France =

American atrocities during World War II

U.S. soldiers committed acts of rape against French women during and after the liberation of France in the later stages of World War II. The sociologist J. Robert Lilly of Northern Kentucky University estimates that 4,500 instances of sexual assault had been transgressed by U.S servicemen in France from June 1944 to the end of the war in May 1945.

== Background ==
The invasion of Normandy in June and a second invasion in the south in August, put over two million front line and support troops of the Western Allies into France in 1944.

The Liberation of Paris followed on 25 August and the majority of German troops had been pushed back to the Siegfried Line by the end of 1944. After the war, the repatriation for demobilization of the troops took time. Even in 1946, months after VE-day, there were still about 1.5 million troops in Europe.

Life magazine reported the widespread view among American troops of France as "a tremendous brothel inhabited by 40 million hedonists who spent all their time eating, drinking, making love, and, in general, having a hell of a good time".

== French complaints ==
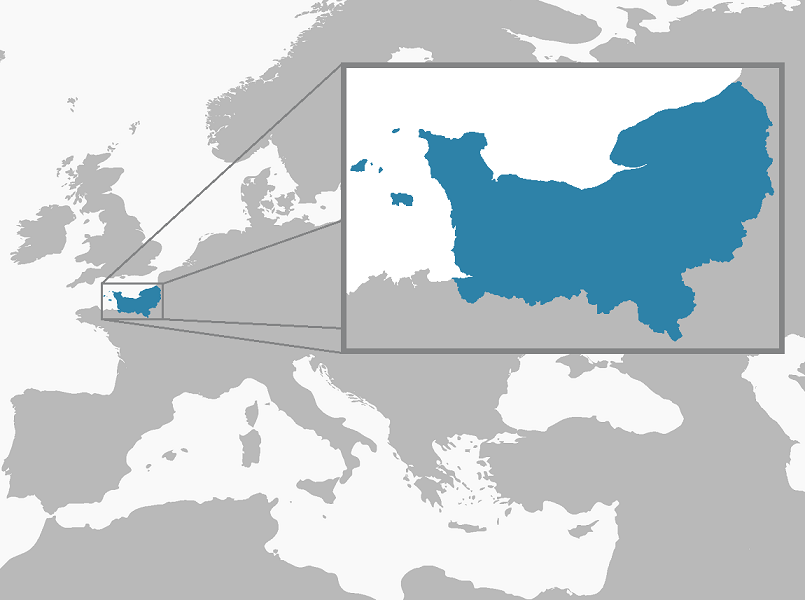
Normandy region

By the late summer of 1944, soon after the invasion of Normandy, women in Normandy began to report numerous instances of sexual violence by American soldiers. Hundreds of cases were reported.

In 1945, after the end of the war in Europe, Le Havre was filled with American servicemen awaiting return to the States. A Le Havre citizen wrote to the mayor that the people of Le Havre were "attacked, robbed, run over both on the street and in our houses" and "This is a regime of terror, imposed by bandits in uniform." A coffeehouse owner from Le Havre testified, "We expected friends who would not make us ashamed of our defeat. Instead, there came only incomprehension, arrogance, incredibly bad manners and the swagger of conquerors." Such behavior also was common in Cherbourg. There existed a local saying that "With the Germans, the men had to camouflage themselves—but with the Americans, we had to hide the women."

U.S. troops committed 208 acts of rape and about 30 murders in the department of Manche.

== U.S. military response ==
A brothel, the "Blue and Gray Corral", was set up near the village of St. Renan in September 1944 by Major General Charles H. Gerhardt, commander of the 29th Infantry Division, partly to counter a wave of rape accusations against American soldiers. It was shut down after a mere five hours in order to prevent civilians in the United States from finding out about a military-run brothel.

The Free French Forces high command sent a letter of complaint to the Supreme Commander Allied Expeditionary Force General Dwight D. Eisenhower. He gave his commanders orders to take action against all allegations of murder, rape, assault, robbery and other crimes. In August 1945, Pierre Voisin, mayor of Le Havre urged Colonel Thomas Weed, U.S. commander in the region, to set up brothels outside Le Havre. However, U.S. commanders refused.

White American soldiers were rarely executed for rape. 139 of the 152 troops charged with rape by the Army in France were African American. U.S. forces executed 29 soldiers for rape, 25 of them African American. Racial bias was not the only factor in the disparities. Most white soldiers were in mobile units, making them harder to track down, whereas most black soldiers were in stationary units. Rape convictions by American military courts in occupied Germany were far less racially skewed than they were in France, with 26% of those convicted in Germany being black.

Some convictions against African Americans were based on circumstantial evidence. For example, Marie Lepoittevin identified William Downes only because he was "much larger" than the other soldiers. Downes and two fellow black soldiers, James R. Parrott and Grant U. Smith, were accused of gang raping Lepoittevin and her 15-year-old daughter Louise Lagouche during a home invasion on the night of July 12, 1944, and later gang raping Louis Leveziel during another home invasion on July 26.

All three men maintained their innocence, but admitted to having been together on the entire evening of July 26. There was some physical evidence against the trio. When Parrott was taken into custody, one officer noticed a white streak across the back of his shirt, resembling calcimine or whitewash. It was discovered that the walls of the room where Leveziel was raped were calcimined. When another soldier rubbed his back against a wall, a similar mark was left on his shirt. In addition, Parrott was found in possession of the stolen purse of Leveziel's elderly father. Leveziel identified Downes, Parrott, and Smith as the three men present when she was raped. She was particularly emphatic in her identification of Downes since he was the largest and was wearing a light colored jacket.

Downes, whom a second witness positively identified as being present on the night that Lepoittevin and Legouche were gang raped, was found guilty of three counts of rape and two counts of housebreaking with intent to commit rape. However, Parrott and Smith, whom nobody could positively identify, were acquitted on all counts related to the July 12 attack and only found guilty of lesser charges for the July 26 attack. The two were convicted of one count of aiding and abetting rape and one count of housebreaking with intent to commit rape. The court found that only Downes had raped Leveziel, but suggested that Parrott and Smith had only refrained from also raping her after hearing nearby voices from outside.

The court sentenced all three soldiers to death by hanging. Following a review of the case, General Eisenhower approved the convictions, but commuted the sentences of Parrott and Smith to life in prison plus a dishonorable discharge. After losing other appeals, Downes was publicly hanged in a field just south of the village of Étienville, where the first rapes were committed, on February 28, 1945.

== Historical retrospective ==
According to Alice Kaplan, an American historian of France and chair of the Department of French at Yale University, the U.S. military tolerated rape of French women less than that of German women. She argued that the number of rape instances is well documented and is less than that of other Allied armies of era, writing that "Nine hundred and four American soldiers were tried for rape in Europe, and even if the actual numbers were much higher, they do not compare with a terrible legacy of World War II-era rape" committed, for example, by the Japanese in Nanking, by Germans in the German-occupied areas, by the French-Moroccans in Italy and by the Soviet soldiers across Eastern Europe and Germany. J. Robert Lilly, Regents professor of sociology and criminology at Northern Kentucky University, reported in Taken by Force: Rape and American GIs in Europe in World War II his estimate that 14,000 instances of rape were committed by U.S. soldiers in France, Germany and the United Kingdom between 1942 and 1945. More specifically, Lilly estimated that U.S. servicemen committed around 3,500 rapes in France between June 1944 and the end of the war.

== See also ==
- 1995 Okinawa rape incident
- Mahmudiyah rape and murders
- Wartime sexual violence

Allied forces

- Rape during the occupation of Poland
- Rape during the occupation of Germany
- Rape during the occupation of Japan
- Rape during the liberation of Serbia
- Rape during the occupation of Manchuria

Axis forces

- Comfort women
- German military brothels in World War II
- War crimes of the Wehrmacht#Rape
- Japanese war crimes#Rape
