= Scott McIntyre (journalist) =

Australian football commentator

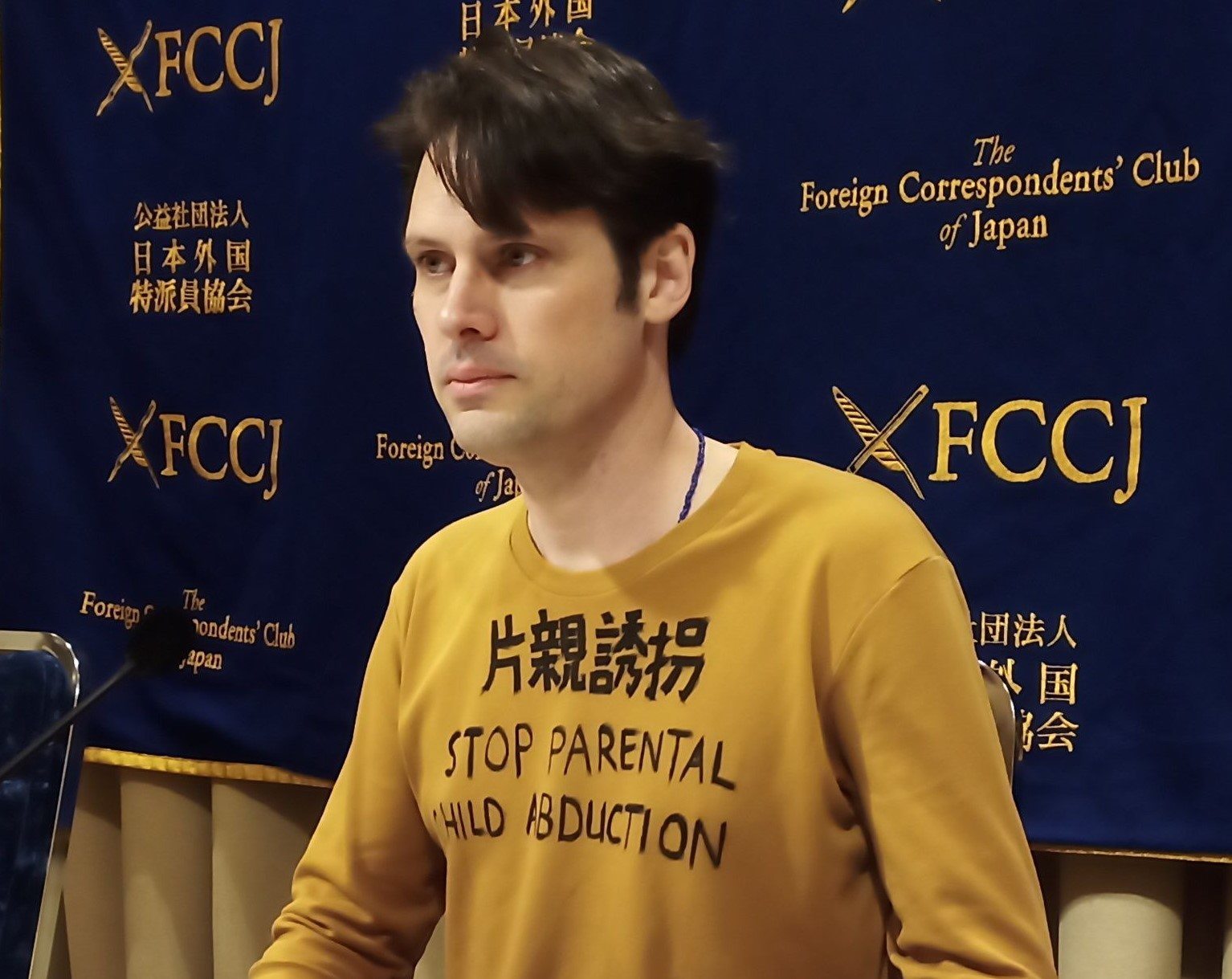
Scott McIntyre at a press conference at the Foreign Correspondents' Club of Japan on 16 January 2020

Scott McIntyre is an Australian football commentator formerly employed by SBS. He joined SBS in 2003, and was a sports reporter from 2008 to 2015. He was a presenter of the SBS soccer program The World Game. He has also written for The Guardian.

== Career ==
On Anzac Day 2015, he made five tweets criticising atrocities committed by Australian soldiers, the atomic bombings of Hiroshima and Nagasaki and the celebration of Anzac Day. He was criticised by the then-communications minister Malcolm Turnbull over Twitter. Minister Turnbull also had a late-night phone call with Michael Ebeid, the managing director of SBS. The next morning McIntyre was sacked. Turnbull denied having any influence over the sacking.

After this, McIntyre retained the law firm Maurice Blackburn, who worked pro bono, and took legal action against SBS under the Fair Work Act 2009 for unfair dismissal alleging that proper procedure had not been followed. The Fair Work Commission ruled that his unfair dismissal case could go ahead. SBS claimed that he had been sacked not for exercising his free speech but for violating the SBS code of conduct and social media guidelines. SBS settled the case out of court shortly before a three-day hearing in the New South Wales Federal Court was to have started.

On Anzac Day 2016, McIntyre again made several tweets regarding past Australian war crimes, such as the Surafend affair and an excerpt from Time of Fallen Blossoms by Allan Clifton describing a gang rape by Australian soldiers of a Japanese girl in Hiroshima during the Occupation of Japan. The tweets again attracted considerable media attention.

== Personal life ==
Japan Custody Battle

McIntyre lived in Tokyo with his wife from 2015, he has two children. After the breakdown of his marriage, the children went to stay with their Japanese maternal grandparents for a night in May 2019, but were never returned. On 26 October 2019, McIntyre gained access to the apartment block where his parents-in-law live by following in another resident. He says he searched for evidence that his children were there and on various visits buzzed the intercom of his in-laws. McIntyre says he was in the apartment building for less than two minutes, but he was reported to the police. He was arrested a month later on 28 November 2019, and detained for 45 days in a detention centre in west Tokyo. On January 15, 2020, he was found guilty of trespassing and given a suspended six-month jail sentence, suspended for three years. Japan does not recognise joint custody of children upon family separation.

Criticism of Japan's detention system

After his conviction, McIntyre held a press conference at the Foreign Correspondents' Club of Japan in which he criticised Japan's detention system. "I was subjected to the same treatment as Carlos Ghosn was with the use of 24-hour light, which is classified by both the United Nations and Amnesty International as a method of torture. On three separate occasions I asked to make a formal complaint that I was being tortured and I was told that nothing would be done and if I complained further, I would be placed in solitary confinement or a strait jacket. These are not the marks of a modern, civilized nation and also bring shame on the nation of Japan and should be immediately ended, not just for myself but for the 95 percent of detainees and prisoners who are Japanese and who also don't have a voice in this issue. I did 45 days detention for a minute of just going into the lobby of my parents-in-law’s apartment to try and see if my children were safe after a natural disaster. I was handcuffed and put in a four-by-three tatami-mat cell. I shared a cell with several murderers, with a rapist, with a pedophile, with a violent armed robber, with various yakuza."

"We were not permitted to stand up in the cell, so you have to sit at a table. You were not allowed to lean against the wall. So that was 23 and a half hours a day of sitting on the floor. You could lie down for a two-hour nap period in the afternoon and you could lie down at night, but during the day you had to remain seated at the desk, and over the nine-day New Year period, there was no exercise."

"‘I made three separate complaints about what I explained to them was torture and was not permitted under Amnesty International and U.N. regulations and as I said before I was told this is just my opinion that this is Japanese law and this is the way things are done in Japan and if I made any further complaints about it I was threatened with either being placed in isolation cell or with a strait jacket."
