= Rape during the occupation of Germany =

Human rights abuses during the Allied occupation of Germany

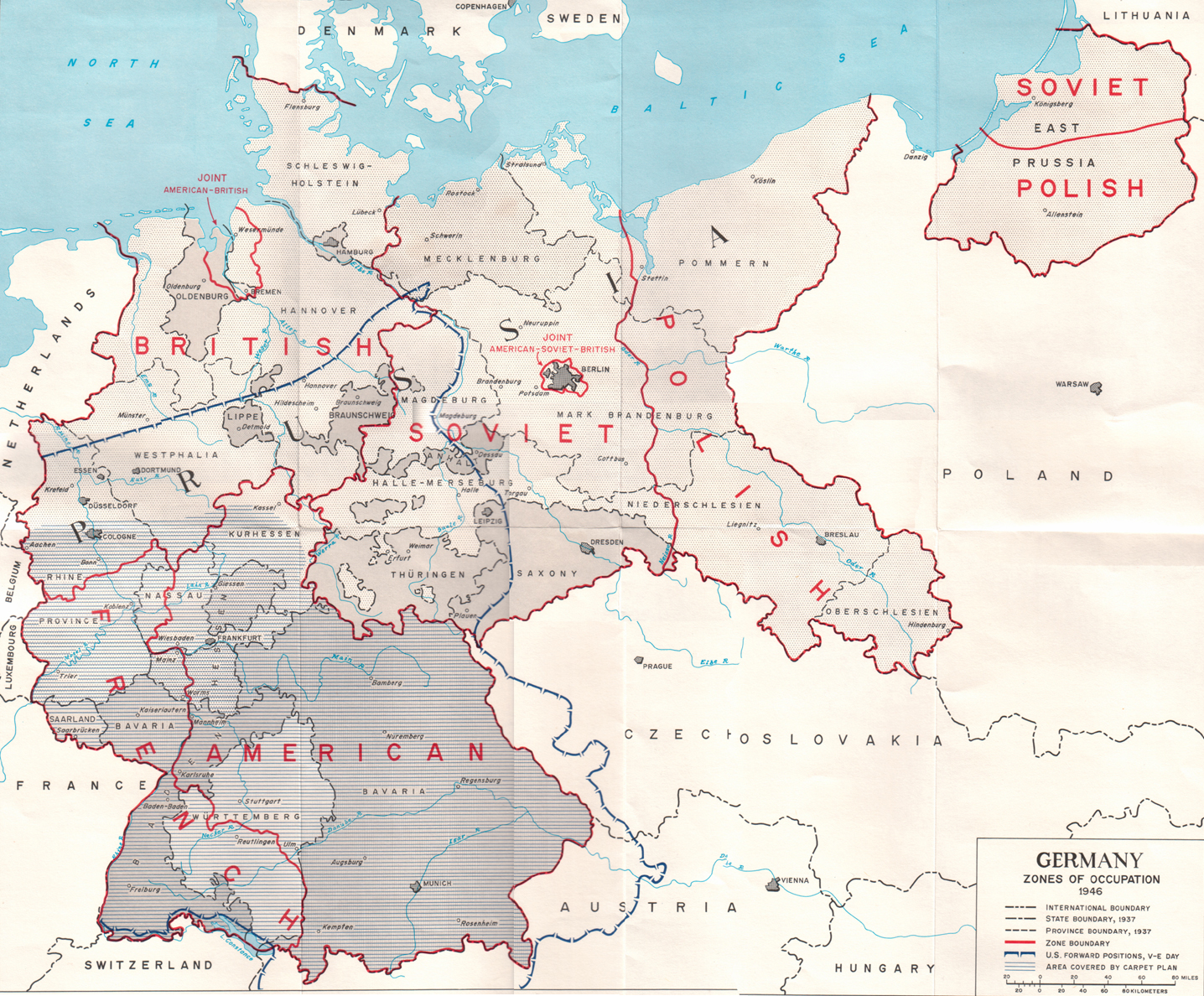
Territorial changes and occupational zones of Nazi Germany after its defeat. The map includes the front-line along the Elbe from which U.S. troops withdrew in July 1945.

As Allied troops entered and occupied German territory during the later stages of World War II, mass rapes of women took place both in connection with combat operations and during the subsequent occupation of Germany by soldiers from all advancing Allied armies, although a majority of scholars agree that the records show that a majority of the rapes were committed by Soviet occupation troops. The wartime rapes were followed by decades of silence.

According to historian Antony Beevor, whose books were banned in 2015 from some Russian schools and colleges, NKVD (Soviet secret police) files have revealed that the leadership knew what was happening, but did little to stop it. It was often rear echelon units who committed the rapes. The exact number of German women and girls raped by Soviet troops during the war and occupation is uncertain, but historians estimate their numbers are likely in the hundreds of thousands, and possibly as many as two million.

== Soviet troops ==
Sexual violence was committed by the armies of the Western Allies and the Red Army as their troops fought their way into the Third Reich and during the period of occupation. Mass rape by Soviet soldiers first began during the Battle of Romania and during the Budapest offensive in Hungary. On the territory of Nazi Germany, it began on 21 October 1944 when troops of the Red Army crossed the bridge over the Angerapp creek (marking the Germany–Poland border) and committed the Nemmersdorf massacre before they were beaten back a few hours later. The details and level of violence committed on this incident have since been disputed.

The majority of the assaults were committed in the Soviet occupation zone; estimates of the numbers of German women raped by Soviet soldiers have ranged up to 2 million. According to historian William Hitchcock, in many cases women were the victims of repeated rapes, some as many as 60 to 70 times. At least 100,000 women are believed to have been raped in Berlin, based on surging abortion rates in the following months and contemporary hospital reports, with an estimated 10,000 women dying in the aftermath. Female deaths in connection with the rapes in Germany, overall, are estimated at 240,000. Antony Beevor describes it as the "greatest phenomenon of mass rape in history" and concludes that at least 1.4 million women were raped in East Prussia, Pomerania and Silesia alone. According to the Soviet war correspondent Natalya Gesse, Soviet soldiers raped German females from eight to eighty years old. Soviet and Polish women were not spared either. When General Tsygankov, head of the political department of the First Ukrainian Front, reported to Moscow the mass rape of Soviet women deported to Germany for forced labour, he recommended that the women be prevented from describing their ordeal on their return to Russia.

When the Yugoslav Partisan politician Milovan Djilas complained about rapes in Yugoslavia, Joseph Stalin reportedly stated that he should "understand it if a soldier who has crossed thousands of kilometres through blood and fire and death has fun with a woman or takes some trifle". On another occasion, when told that Red Army soldiers sexually maltreated German refugees, he reportedly said: "We lecture our soldiers too much; let them have some initiative!" Nevertheless, there are no surviving records to prove that rape was legally sanctioned.

Konstantin Rokossovsky issued order No. 006 in an attempt to direct "the feelings of hatred at fighting the enemy on the battlefield", which had little effect. There were also several arbitrary attempts to exert authority. For example, the commander of one rifle division is said to have "personally shot a lieutenant who was lining up a group of his men before a German woman spread-eagled on the ground".

=== Studies ===
The historian Norman Naimark writes that after mid-1945, Soviet soldiers caught raping civilians were usually punished to some degree, which ranged from arrest to execution. The rapes continued until the winter of 1947–48, when the Soviet Military Administration in Germany finally confined Soviet Army troops to guard posts and camps strictly and to separate them from the residential population in the Soviet zone of Germany.

In his analysis of the motives behind the extensive Soviet rapes, Norman Naimark singles out "hate propaganda, personal experiences of suffering at home, and an allegedly fully demeaning picture of German women in the press, not to mention among the soldiers themselves" as some reasons for the widespread rapes. Naimark also noted the effect that tendency to binge-drink alcohol (of which much was available in Germany) had on the propensity of Soviet soldiers to commit rape, especially rape-murder. Naimark also notes the allegedly-patriarchal nature of Russian culture and of the Asian societies constituting the Soviet Union, where dishonor had been repaid by raping the women of the enemy. The fact that the Germans had a much higher standard of living visible even when in ruins "may well have contributed allegedly to a national inferiority complex among Russians". Combining "Russian feelings of inferiority", the resulting need to restore honor, and their desire for revenge may be reasons for why many women were raped in public as well as in front of husbands before both were killed.

According to Antony Beevor, revenge was not the only reason for the frequent rapes, but the Soviet troops' feeling of entitlement to all types of spoils of war, including women, was an important factor as well. Beevor exemplifies that with his discovery that Soviet troops also raped Soviet and Polish girls and women that were liberated from Nazi concentration camps as well as those who were held for forced labour at farms and factories. The rapes were often perpetrated by rear echelon units.

The description of the events by Beevor was criticized by General of the Russian Army Makhmut Gareev, who said the work by Beevor was "worse than Joseph Goebbels's propaganda". Russian Professor Oleg Rzheshevsky claimed that 4,148 Red Army officers and "a significant number" of soldiers were convicted of atrocities for crimes committed against German civilians.

Richard Overy, a historian from King's College London, has criticised the viewpoint put forth by the Russians by asserting that they refuse to acknowledge Soviet war crimes committed during the war: "Partly this is because they felt that much of it was justified vengeance against an enemy who committed much worse, and partly it was because they were writing the victors' history."

Geoffrey Roberts writes that the Red Army raped women in every country they passed through but mostly in Austria and Germany: 70,000–100,000 rapes in Vienna, and "hundreds of thousands" of rapes in Germany.

In 2015, Beevor's books were banned and censored in some Russian schools and colleges.

=== Eyewitnesses ===
A documentary book, War's Unwomanly Face by Svetlana Alexievich, includes memories of Soviet veterans about their experience in Germany. According to a former army officer,

We were young, strong, and four years without women. So we tried to catch German women and ... Ten men raped one girl. There were not enough women; the entire population [ran] from the Soviet Army. So we had to take young, twelve or thirteen year-old[s]. If she cried, we put something into her mouth. We thought it was fun. Now I can not understand how I did it. A boy from a good family ... But that was me.

A woman telephone operator from the Soviet Army recalled:

When we occupied every town, we had [the] first three days for looting and ... [rapes]. That was unofficial of course. But after three days one could be court-martialed for doing this ... I remember one raped German woman laying naked, with [a] hand grenade between her legs. Now I feel shame, but I did not feel shame back then ... Do you think it was easy to forgive [the Germans]? We hated to see their clean undamaged white houses. With roses. I wanted them to suffer. I wanted to see their tears. Decades had to pass until I started feeling pity for them.

While serving as an artillery officer in East Prussia, Aleksandr Solzhenitsyn witnessed war crimes against local German civilians by Soviet military personnel. Of the atrocities, Solzhenitsyn wrote: "You know very well that we've come to Germany to take our revenge" for Nazi atrocities committed in the Soviet Union.

The rapists were mainly Red Army soldiers; some of them were from the Far East and Central Asian Republics, while others were non-Soviet European and American soldiers. However, stereotypes of the "hordes of Mongolian savages," eager to murder, pillage, destroy and rape, had been propagated by the Nazi authorities to mobilize people for the fight against the Soviet offensive. Even the young German-Jewish fugitive Inge Deutschkron, described her first "Russian" as small, with crooked legs and "a typical Mongolian face with almond eyes and high cheekbones". Accounts of rape of German women by the Mongolians were also recorded in the letter. For example, a letter dated 24 July 1945 from a German woman stated that she had been raped by two Mongol soldiers, and another letter from 20 August 1945 also accused a "Mongol" soldier of raping German women.

For example, a letter from July 24, 1945 by a German female victim stated:

I hereby certify that at the end of April this year during the Russian march into Berlin I was raped in a loathsome way by two Red Army soldiers of Mongol/Asiatic type.

A letter from another German female victim in August 20, 1945:

On the way to work on second Easter holiday I was raped by a Mongol ...

Eyewitness testimony from females in the Battle of Berlin also described Soviet soldiers of "Mongolian" type:

The next morning, we women proceeded to make ourselves look as unattractive as possible to the Soviets by smearing our faces with coal dust and covering our heads with old rags, our make-up for the Ivan. We huddled together in the central part of the basement, shaking with fear, while some peeked through the low basement windows to see what was happening on the Soviet-controlled street. We felt paralyzed by the sight of these husky Mongolians, looking wild and frightening ...

=== Social effects ===
The exact number of German women and girls raped by Soviet troops during the war and occupation is uncertain, but western historians estimate their numbers are likely in the hundreds of thousands and possibly as many as two million. The number of babies, who came to be known as "Russian Children", born as a result is unknown. However, most rapes did not result in pregnancies, and many pregnancies did not result in the victims giving birth. Abortions were the preferred choice of rape victims, and many died as a consequence of internal injuries after being brutally violated, or due to untreated sexually transmitted diseases because of a lack of medicine or badly-performed abortions. Many women committed suicide after rape, mostly due to being unable to cope with their traumatic experience, although some were forced to by their fathers because of their "dishonor", while others were shot and killed by their husbands for "consenting to sexual relations with Allied soldiers". Many German women were verbally abused by German soldiers on the streets or in their homes for being "Allied whores", while a lot of them even received threatening letters from German men. In addition, many children died in postwar Germany as a result of widespread starvation, scarce supplies and diseases such as typhus and diphtheria. The infant mortality in Berlin reached up to 90%.

As for the social effects of the sexual violence, Norman Naimark noted:

In any case, just as each rape survivor carried the effects of the crime with her till the end of her life, so was the collective anguish nearly unbearable. The social psychology of women and men in the Soviet zone of occupation was marked by the crime of rape from the first days of occupation, through the founding of the GDR in the fall of 1949, until—one could argue—the present.

West Berliners and women of the wartime generation refer to the Soviet War Memorial in Treptower Park, Berlin, as the "tomb of the unknown rapist" in response to the mass rapes by Red Army soldiers in 1945 during and after the Battle of Berlin.

Hannelore Kohl, the first wife of former West German Chancellor Helmut Kohl, had been gang-raped at the age of 12 by Soviet soldiers in May 1945, according to her biographer. As a consequence, she sustained a serious lifelong back injury after she had been thrown out of a first-floor window. She suffered long and serious illnesses, which experts thought to be the consequences of childhood trauma. Hannelore Kohl took her own life in 2001.

=== In Soviet literature ===
Initially, East German and Soviet propaganda suggested that most of the rapes were being conducted by Germans disguised as Soviet soldiers, including Werwolf battalions Aleksandr Solzhenitsyn took part in the invasion of Germany and wrote a poem about it, "Prussian Nights". Parts of the poem read, "Twenty-two Hoeringstrasse. It's not been burned, just looted, rifled. A moaning by the walls, half muffled: the mother's wounded, half alive. The little daughter's on the mattress, dead. How many have been on it? A platoon, a company perhaps? A girl's been turned into a woman, a woman turned into a corpse.... The mother begs, 'Soldier, kill me!'" Records of sexual violence were found in works of other Soviet authors, mostly in the form of war memoirs mentioning particular incidents witnessed by the authors, such as Lev Kopelev, Vladimir Gelfand, Mikhail Koryakov, Eugenii Plimak, David Samoilow, Boris Slutskii, Nikolay Nikulin, Grigorii Pomerants, Leonid Ryabichev and Vassily Grossman. Vera Dubina and Oleg Budnitskii were among those few historians who investigated the subject more systematically.

=== In popular culture ===
As most women recoiled from their experiences and had no desire to recount them, most biographies and depictions of the period, like the 2004 German film Downfall, alluded to mass rape by the Red Army but stopped shy of mentioning it explicitly. As time has progressed, more works have been produced that have directly addressed the issue, such as the books The 158-Pound Marriage and My Story (1961) by Gemma LaGuardia Gluck, reissued as Fiorello's Sister: Gemma La Guardia Gluck's Story (Religion, Theology, and the Holocaust) (2007, Expanded Edition), or the 2006 films Joy Division and The Good German.

The topic is the subject of much feminist discourse. The first autobiographical work depicting the events was the groundbreaking 1954 book A Woman in Berlin, which was made into a 2008 feature film. It was widely rejected in Germany after its initial publication but has seen a new acceptance, and many women have found inspiration to come forward with their own stories.

== Anti-Soviet propaganda ==
For more than a decade, Nazi anti-Soviet propaganda had created irrational fears and racial stereotypes of Soviet invaders as "Asiatic Russians", extending beyond fears of Uzbeks, Kalmyks, Tadzhiks to include Russians as a mixed of Asian and European stock. This is despite the fact that some Kalmyk Mongols collaborated with the German occupation authorities, although the vast majority of the Kalmyk male population fought in the ranks of the Soviet Red Army.

Atina Grossman in her article in "October" describes how until early 1945, the abortions in Germany were illegal except for medical and eugenic reasons and so doctors opened up and started performing abortions to rape victims for which only an affidavit was requested from a woman. It was also typical that women specified their reasons for abortions as being mostly socio-economic (inability to raise another child), rather than moral or ethical. Many women stated they were raped but their accounts described the rapist as looking Asian or Mongolian. German women uniformly described the rapists as "of Mongolian or Asiatic type".

Despite Nazi propaganda there is some evidence of recorded rapes by Soviet troops of Asian origin. In April 1945, Magda Wieland took shelter in the cellar of her apartment house. She described that the first Soviet soldier to find her was a young 16 year-old Central Asian male, who raped her. It was reported that a Soviet commander was greatly embarrassed by wholesale rape of German women by ethnic Kazakh soldiers who were by far the worse offenders and were described as being Mongol Hordes. Another recorded case involves German director Schmidt, who burst into Villa Franka, and yelled at Russian commander Isayev "Your soldiers are raping German women!". The raped German victim pointed at a Kazakh soldier being the perpetrator, who was immediately arrested. The Kazakh soldier in return claimed he wanted revenge against the Germans who killed his two brothers in battle, and was sentenced to be shot the following day.

== U.S. troops ==
In Taken by Force, J. Robert Lilly estimates the number of rapes committed by U.S. servicemen in Germany to be 11,040. However, German historian Miriam Gebhardt suggests a number as high as 190,000 rapes by American soldiers out of an estimated total of 860,000 by all allied soldiers. She made this estimate based on the "assumption that 5 percent of the 'war children'" were "the product of rape". She then "further assumes that on average, there are 100 incidents of rape for each birth. The result she arrives at is thus 190,000 victims." Gebhardt's estimate was criticized by other historians. The historian R.M. Douglas has analyzed the police side of the story, those efforts by the U.S. Army's Military Police to investigate allegations and initiate military courts martial against identified perpetrators. The U.S. Army in Germany received 1,301 reports of rape on German women between January and July 1945. Accounts from the time period point to years of sexual violence in both East and West Germany. The violence targeted girls as young as 7 and women as old as 69. Stories such as Eine Frau in Berlin include firsthand accounts of German women volunteering to coerced relationships with Allied soldiers in exchange for protection from other soldiers. As in the case of the American occupation of France after the D-Day invasion, many of the American rapes in Germany in 1945 were gang rapes committed by armed soldiers at gunpoint. More than a quarter of the reported rapes from January to July 1945 were multiple-victim rapes. Brian Walsh writes that the incidence of rape by American soldiers in Germany was higher than that seen in Japan, though the incidence later became similar to that in Japan following the sharp decline in June during the American occupation of Germany.

Although policies against fraternization were instituted for the Americans in Germany, the phrase "copulation without conversation is not fraternization" was used as a motto by United States Army troops. The journalist Osmar White, a war correspondent from Australia who served with the American troops during the war, wrote:

After the fighting moved on to German soil, there was a good deal of rape by combat troops and those immediately following them. The incidence varied between unit and unit according to the attitude of the commanding officer. In some cases offenders were identified, tried by court martial, and punished. The army legal branch was reticent, but admitted that for brutal or perverted sexual offences against German women, some soldiers had been shot – particularly if they happened to be Negroes. Yet I know for a fact that many women were raped by white Americans. No action was taken against the culprits. In one sector a report went round that a certain very distinguished army commander made the wisecrack, 'Copulation without conversation does not constitute fraternisation.'

A typical victimization with sexual assault by drunken American personnel marching through occupied territory involved threatening a German family with weapons, forcing one or more women to engage in sex, and putting the entire family out on the street afterward. As in the eastern sector of the occupation, the number of rapes peaked in 1945, but a high rate of violence against the German and Austrian populations by the Americans lasted at least into the first half of 1946, with five cases of dead German women found in American barracks in May and June 1946 alone.

Carol Huntington wrote that the American soldiers who raped German women and then left gifts of food for them may have permitted themselves to view the act as prostitution rather than rape. Citing the work of a Japanese historian alongside that suggestion, Huntington writes that Japanese women who begged for food "were raped and soldiers sometimes left food for those they raped."

White American soldiers in Germany were responsible for mass rapes, but the Black soldiers of America's segregated occupation force were both more likely to be charged with rape and severely punished. However, Walsh argues that while individual acts of rape did take place, mass rape by American soldiers in Germany, comparable to that committed by Soviet troops, did not occur, and the policing of troops as well as record-keeping remained uninterrupted. Heide Fehrenbach also writes that while the American Black soldiers were in fact by no means free from indiscipline,

The point, rather, is that American officials exhibited an explicit interest in a soldier's race, and then only if he were black, when reporting behavior they feared would undermine either the status or the political aims of the U.S. Military Government in Germany.

At the same time, however, rape convictions by American military courts in occupied Germany were still far less racially skewed than they were in France, with only 26% of those convicted being black. The historian R.M. Douglas, analyzing the victim statements in U.S. Army Military Police files, noted that between January and July 1945, in cases where the victims identified the race of their attacker, 6% of the attacks involving multiple perpetrators involved more than one race being identified, and 41% of the accounts identified the assailants as white, 52% as black, and 1% as Latino or Hispanic.

The first reported rape by American troops in Germany occurred on January 7, 1945. Between then and September 23, 1945, when the United States Army Judge Advocate General's Corps reviewed its last report, the U.S. Army convicted 284 soldiers in 187 cases. No American soldiers were executed for raping civilians in occupied Germany, only murder.

== British troops ==
Sean Longden states that while not on the scale of the Red Army in the Soviet zone, the British Military Police regularly investigated reports of rape. However the numbers were small compared to the number of desertions:

The question of how they should respond to the few soldiers who committed serious criminal acts, such as rape and murder, was of little concern to the [British] military authorities. It made good sense to arrest such trouble makers, bring them to trial and dispose of them in military prisons. Such men were easily dispensable and best kept locked away. Dealing with the army's largest group of offenders, the deserters, was rather less simple.

Longden mentions that some rapes were carried out by soldiers either suffering from post traumatic stress or who were drunk, but that these were not considered as serious as the less common premeditated crimes.

Longden mentions that on 16 April 1945, three women in Neustadt am Rübenberge were raped, however he does not make clear if this was one incident or three separate ones. He also does not make clear if they were spontaneous or premeditated. He gives an example of a premeditated rape: In the village of Oyle, near Nienburg, an attempted rape of two local girls at gunpoint by two soldiers ended in the death of one of the girls when, whether intentionally or not, one of the soldiers shot her. In a third example, Longden highlights that not all British officers were willing to punish their men. When a German woman reported a rape to a British Army medic, two British soldiers were identified by the woman in a line up as the perpetrators, but their commanding officer declined to take any action because "they were going on leave".

Clive Emsley quotes a senior British Army chaplain as reporting that there was "a good deal of rape going on, those who suffer [rape] have probably deserved it". However, he adds that probably referred to attacks by former slave labourers (displaced persons) seeking revenge. Longden also mentions such incidents and highlights that for a time Hanover, in the British zone, was in a state of anarchy with displaced persons raping and murdering German civilians. Initially, when German family members approached the overstretched British authorities about murders they were told "we only have time for living people here".

== French troops ==
French troops took part in the invasion of Germany, and France was assigned an occupation zone in Germany. Perry Biddiscombe quotes the original survey estimates that the French for instance committed "385 rapes in the Constance area; 600 in Bruchsal; and 500 in Freudenstadt." French Goumiers were alleged to have committed widespread rape in the Höfingen district near Leonberg. Katz and Kaiser, though they mention rape, found no specific occurrences in either Höfingen or Leonberg compared to other towns.

According to Norman Naimark, French Moroccan troops matched the behaviour of Soviet troops when it came to rape, in particular in the early occupation of Baden and Württemberg, provided the numbers are correct.

German academic historians at Jena and Magdeburg contend that only France supported the children of its occupying armies resulting from the mass rape of German women. In the four occupied zones, however, many children of German mothers were ignored their entire lives. Children of French troops were regarded as French citizens. At least 1,500 children in France and its colonies were given up for adoption. Others never overcame the apparent flaw, while some "occupation children" gradually made their way in the divided society of Germany.

== Discourse ==
It has been frequently repeated that the wartime rapes were surrounded by decades of silence or, until relatively recently, ignored by academics, with the prevailing attitude being that the Germans were the perpetrators of war crimes, Soviet writings speaking only of Russian liberators and German guilt and Western historians focusing on specific elements of the Holocaust.

In postwar Germany, especially in West Germany, the wartime rape stories became an essential part of political discourse and that the rape of German women, along with the expulsion of Germans from the East and the Allied occupation, had been universalized in an attempt to situate the German population on the whole as victims. However, it has been argued that it was not a "universal" story of women being raped by men but of German women being abused and violated by an army, which fought Nazi Germany and liberated death camps.

== In literature ==
The sexual violence perpetrated by Soviet troops is depicted in the 1963 Leon Uris novel Armageddon: A Novel of Berlin.

== See also ==
- Comfort women
- German military brothels in World War II
- Marta Hillers
- Marocchinate—rape after the Battle of Monte Cassino
- Prostitutes in South Korea for the U.S. military
- Rape during the liberation of France
- Rape during the liberation of Serbia
- Rape during the Soviet occupation of Poland
- Rape during the occupation of Japan
- Rape during the occupation of Manchuria
- Rape during the Bangladesh Liberation War
- Recreation and Amusement Association
- Soviet war crimes
- Stunde Null
- United States war crimes
- War crimes of the Wehrmacht#Rape
- Nazi birthing centres for foreign workers
- Wartime sexual violence
- A Woman in Berlin

== Sources ==
- Alexievich, Svetlana (1988). War's Unwomanly Face. Moscow: Progress publishers. ISBN 978-5-01-000494-1. (Translated from original edition in Russian: Алексиевич, Светлана (2008). У войны не женское лицо (in Russian). Moscow: Vremya publishers. ISBN 978-5-9691-0331-3.) Note: citations in text are given in reference to the Russian edition.
- Dack, Mikkel (June 2008). "Crimes Committed by Soviet Soldiers Against German Civilians, 1944–1945: A Historiographical Analysis" (PDF). Journal of Military and Strategic Studies. 10 (4).
- Douglas, R.M. (April 2023). "Neither Apathetic nor Empathetic: Investigating and Prosecuting the Rape of German Civilians by U.S. Servicemen in 1945". Journal of Military History (87): 404–437.
- MacDonogh, Giles (2009). After the Reich: The Brutal History of the Allied Occupation. Basic Books. ISBN 978-0-465-00338-9.
- Naimark, Norman M. (1995). The Russians in Germany: A History of the Soviet Zone of Occupation, 1945–1949. Cambridge: Belknap Press. ISBN 0-674-78405-7.
- Walsh, Brian (2016). The Rape of Tokyo: Legends of Mass Sexual Violence and Exploitation During the Occupation of Japan (PhD thesis). Princeton University.
- Walsh, Brian (June 2024). The "Rape" of Japan: The Myth of Mass Sexual Violence During the Allied Occupation. Naval Institute Press. ISBN 978-1682479308.
