= Rape during the Soviet occupation of Poland =

Rape by Soviet soldiers while re-occupying Poland

The subject of rape during the Soviet occupation of Poland at the end of World War II in Europe was absent from the postwar historiography until the dissolution of the Soviet Union, although the documents of the era show that the problem was serious both during and after the advance of Soviet forces against Nazi Germany in 1944–1945. The lack of research for nearly half a century regarding the scope of sexual violence by Soviet males, wrote Katherine Jolluck, had been magnified by the traditional taboos among their victims, who were incapable of finding "a voice that would have enabled them to talk openly" about their wartime experiences "while preserving their dignity." Joanna Ostrowska and Marcin Zaremba of the Polish Academy of Sciences wrote that rapes of the Polish women reached a mass scale during the Red Army's Winter Offensive of 1945.

Among the factors contributing to the escalation of sexual violence against women, during the occupation of Poland, was a sense of impunity on the part of individual Soviet units left to fend for themselves by their military leaders. In search of food supplies and provisions – wrote Dr Janusz Wróbel of IPN – the marauding soldiers formed gangs ready to open fire (as in Jędrzejów). Livestock was being herded away, fields cleared of grain without recompense and Polish homes looted. In a letter to his Voivode, a Łódź county starosta warned that plunder of goods from stores and farms was often accompanied by the rape of farmhands as in Zalesie, Olechów, Feliksin and Huta Szklana, not to mention other crimes, including rape–murder in Łagiewniki. The heavily armed marauders robbed cars, horse-drawn carriages, even trains. In his next letter to Polish authorities, the same starosta wrote that rape and plunder is causing the population to fear and hate the Soviet regime.

== Red Army Winter Offensive of 1945 ==
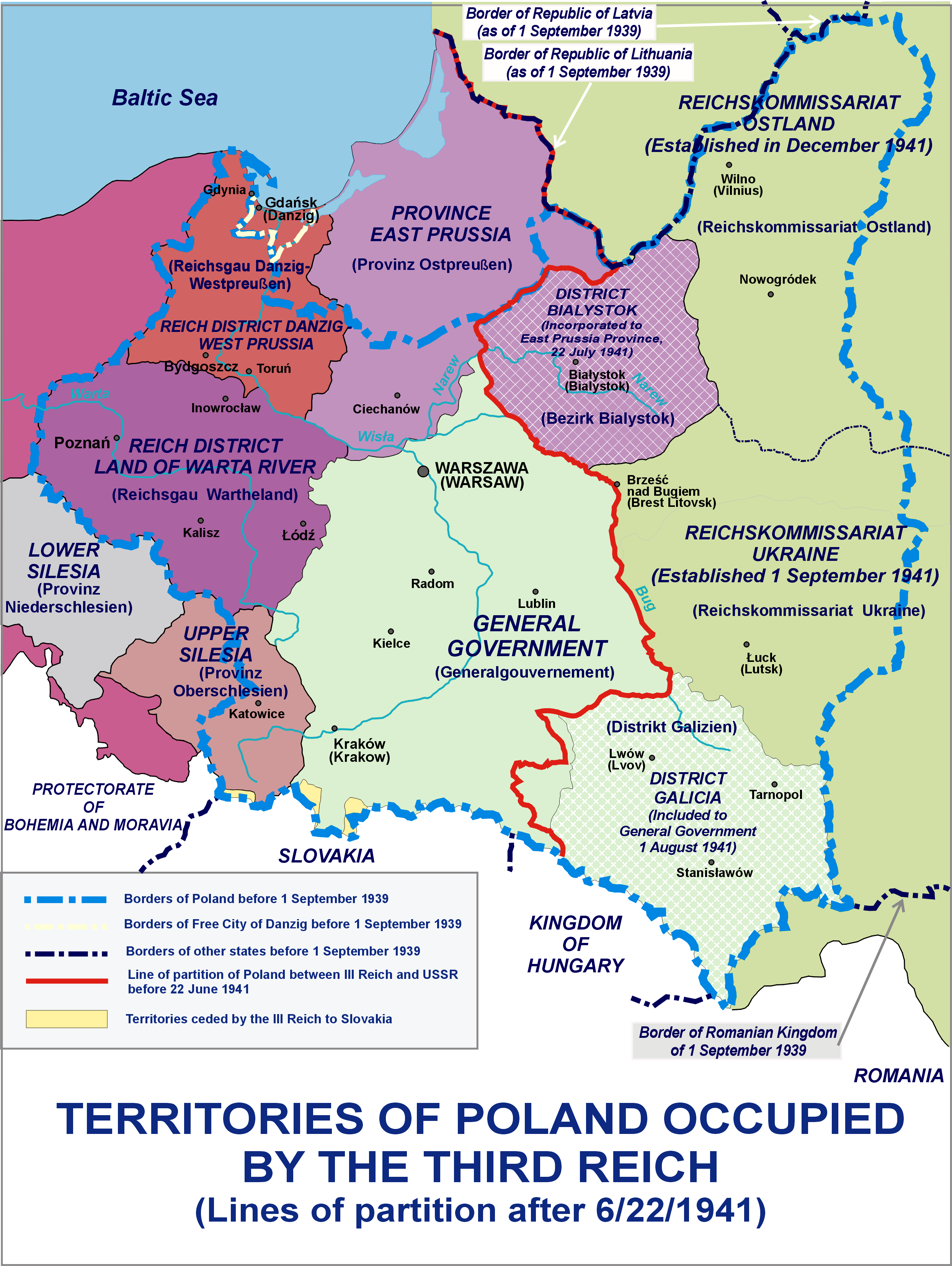
Regions of occupied Poland upon the Soviet westward offensive

Cases of mass rape occurred in major Polish cities taken by the Red Army. In Kraków, Soviet entry into the city was accompanied by the wave of rapes of women and girls, and the widespread theft of personal property. According to Prof. Chwalba of Jagiellonian University, this behavior reached such a scale that the Polish communists installed in the city by the Soviet Union, composed a letter of protest to Joseph Stalin himself. At the Kraków Main station, Poles who tried to rescue the victims of gang rape were shot at. Meanwhile, church masses were held in expectation of the Soviet withdrawal.

Polish women in Silesia were the target of mass rape along with their German counterparts even after the Soviet front moved much further west. In the first six months of 1945, in Dębska Kuźnia 268 rapes were reported. In March 1945 near Racibórz, 30 women captured at a linen factory were locked in a house in Makowo and raped over a period of time under the threat of death. The woman who gave her testimony to the police, was raped by four men. German and Polish women were apprehended on the streets of Katowice, Zabrze and Chorzów and gang raped by drunken soldiers, usually outdoors. According to Naimark, the Red Army servicemen did not differentiate along the ethnic lines, or between victims and occupiers.

Polish and German women in Warmia and Masuria endured the same ordeal, wrote Ostrowska & Zaremba. One letter from the Recovered Territories claimed that in the city of Olsztyn in March 1945, practically no woman survived without being violated by the Soviet rapists "irrespective of their age". Their ages were estimated to range from 9 to 80. Sometimes, a grandmother, a mother and a granddaughter were among the victims. Women were gang raped by as many as several dozen soldiers. In a letter from Gdańsk dated 17 April 1945, a Polish woman who acquired work around the Soviet garrison reported: "because we spoke Polish, we were in demand. However, most victims there were raped up to 15 times. I was raped seven times. It was horrible." A letter from Gdynia, written a week later, said that the only resort for the women was to hide in the basements all day.

== The coming of spring ==
There is evidence that a loophole in the Soviet directives might have contributed to even greater number of rapes committed on Polish women by the Red Army soldiers, according to Jerzy Kochanowski from the University of Warsaw. German women were protected (at least partially) by strict instructions about their treatment during transfer, issued by the Soviet command. However, there were no such instructions, or any instructions whatsoever about the Poles. In the County of Leszno some "war commanders" began to openly claim that their soldiers needed to have sex. At the same time, the farms given to Poles arriving from Kresy were robbed of anything of value by the Red Army, especially agricultural equipment left behind by the Germans.

According to Ostrowska and Zaremba, the month of June 1945 was the worst. A 52-year-old victim of gang rape from Pińczów testified that two Soviet war veterans returning from Berlin told her that they fought for Poland for three years and thus had the right to have all Polish females. In Olkusz twelve rapes were recorded in two days. In Ostrów county, 33 rapes were recorded. The local Militia report stated that on June 25 near Kraków a husband and child were shot dead before a woman was raped in one village, while in another, a 4-year-old girl was sexually assaulted by two Soviet males. According to statistics of the Polish Ministry of Health, there was a pandemic of sexually transmitted diseases across the country, affecting around 10% of the general population. In Masuria up to 50% of women were infected.

According to historian Wiesław Niesiobędzki, in East Prussia (Prusy Wschodnie) many ethnic German women, alarmed by the Nazis, fled ahead of the Soviet offensive, leaving the Polish women to endure rapes and witness the systematic burning of ransacked houses, for example in the town of Iława in late January 1945 under the Soviet Major Konstantinov. Eye witness Gertruda Buczkowska spoke of a labor camp near Wielka Żuława employing two hundred ethnic Belarusian women. In late January 1945 Buczkowska saw their bodies in the snow while fleeing with her mother and five German women of Hamburg who had joined them. The five Germans were found naked and dead in a basement of a house on Rybaków street in Iława a few days later.

== Return from forced labour ==
According to Ostrowska and Zaremba, Polish women taken to Germany for slave labour were raped on a large scale by Soviet soldiers as well as former prisoners of war. In May 1945, at the conference of delegates of various repatriation offices, the final resolution stated: "through Stargard and Szczecin, there is a mass movement of Polish people returning from forced labour in the Third Reich. They are the subject of constant attacks by individual soldiers as well as organized groups. Along the journey, Poles are frequently robbed, and Polish women raped. In our response to the question posed to the Polish delegation of whether the rapes of Polish women could be regarded as exceptional, management of the local repatriation office declared, on the basis of permanent contact with the returning Poles, that women are the target of violent aggression as a matter of course, not the opposite". Russian historian Ia. S. Drabkin suggested in a 1989 interview that it was "not the soldiers who caused most of the problems with rape in the occupation administration, but former Soviet POWs and Soviet citizens working for SVAG, who often wore uniforms" which looked the same.

Sometimes, even the presence of militia could not provide adequate protection, since the militiamen were frequently disarmed. For the women, moving trains and the train stations were especially dangerous, as in Bydgoszcz or around Radom and Legnica. The grave situation in Pomerania was described in a report by one agent of the Government Delegation for Poland, quoted by Ostrowska and Zaremba. In some counties there were virtual "orgies of rape". The commandant of Polish militia headquarters in Trzebiatów issued a warning to all Polish women not to walk outside without an escort.

"With nearly two million Russian deserters and former POWs at large in Soviet-occupied Europe, it is no wonder that banditry on their part became a serious problem for the occupation," wrote Naimark. The number of Polish victims of rape in 1944–1947 would be hard to estimate accurately. The biggest difficulty in estimating their number comes from the fact that the ethnic makeup of the victims was not always stated in Polish official reports. Generally speaking, the attitude of Soviet servicemen toward women of Slavic background was better than toward those who spoke German. According to Ostrowska and Zaremba, whether the number of purely Polish victims could have reached or even exceeded 100,000 remains a matter of guesswork.

== See also ==
- Rape during the occupation of Germany
- Rape during the occupation of Japan
- Rape during the occupation of Manchuria
- Rape during the liberation of France
- Rape during the liberation of Serbia
- Special Comfort Facility Association
- U.N. Comfort Station
- Comfort women
- The Innocents
- Marocchinate

== Notes and references ==
- Katarzyna Kulik, "Historie (z) emocją pisane. Rozmowa z Leszkiem Jodlińskim, dyrektorem Muzeum w Gliwicach," (interview with Director of the Gliwice Museum, Leszek Jodliński), about the monograph Rok ostatni – rok pierwszy. Gliwice 1945 by Bogusław Tracz from IPN. The article includes photographs from archives of the Museum. Miejski Serwis Informacyjny, 11/2006 (264)
