= My Brother, My Sister, and I =

1996 autobiographical novel by Yoko Kawashima Watkins

- 1996 cover
- Author: Yoko Kawashima Watkins
- Language: English
- Series: Bamboo Grove
- Genre: War novel, Autobiographical novel
- Publisher: Simon & Schuster
- Publication date: 1994
- Publication place: United States
- Media type: Print (Hardback & Paperback)
- Pages: 224 pp
- ISBN: 0-02-792526-9
- Preceded by: So Far from the Bamboo Grove

My Brother, My Sister, and I is an autobiographical novel written by Yoko Kawashima Watkins, a Japanese-American writer. It is the sequel to So Far from the Bamboo Grove and it tells the tale of Yoko's life as a refugee in Japan and how her family perseveres without losing faith despite false accusations, murder, sickness, and the fear of not being able to reunite with their father. It instantly starts in Japan, telling the story of their survival.

== Bibliography ==
- Watkins, Yoko Kawashima (2008). My Brother, My Sister, and I. Simon and Schuster. ISBN 978-1439107874.
- Watkins, Yoko Kawashima (1994). So Far from the Bamboo Grove. HarperCollins. ISBN 0688131158.
