= Taken by Force (book) =

2007 book by J. Robert Lilly

Taken by Force: Rape and American GIs in Europe in World War II
- Author: J. Robert Lilly
- Language: English
- Subject: Rape, World War II
- Genre: Non-fiction
- Publisher: Palgrave Macmillan
- Publication date: August 7, 2007
- Publication place: United States
- Media type: Hardcover
- Pages: 256
- ISBN: 0-230-50647-X

Taken by Force: Rape and American GIs in Europe in World War II is a 2007 book by Northern Kentucky University sociology and criminology professor J. Robert Lilly that examines the issue of rape by U.S. servicemen in the European theatre of World War II.

== Synopsis ==
Taken by Force explores the patterns of rapes committed by US servicemen during the Second World War between the years of 1942 and 1945, as well as the reaction of the American army in response to the crimes. The book draws upon court records, newspaper articles, and trial transcripts, covering the 14,000 rapes that Lilly estimated, using a formula created by Leon Radzinowicz, which occurred in Britain, France, and Germany at the hands of US soldiers.

Chapter 2 covers "explanations for sexual violence during war", which includes discussion about rape being used as a "tool of genocide", as an "inherent feature of military culture", and as a "means of revenge."

Chapters 3, 4, and 5 consecutively act as "analyses of rape and rape prosecutions" in England, France, and Germany, and how the number of rapes in each country differed because of the views American soldiers held about the civilian peoples of each country.

== Critical reception ==
The book was reviewed in the Australian Army Journal and described the book as "extensively researched and referenced" with Lilly setting himself to the difficult task of dealing with the highly sensitive topic of rape in an approachable, confronting and transparent manner but criticized the book for dealing with the victims with an overly broad brush. The book was also reviewed by The Journal of Military History which called it a "detailed study". Writing for The Guardian, Cambridge University historian Richard Drayton stated that the moral of the book was the "brutalising momentum" of war.

Sarah Armstrong of the Probation Journal considered Taken by Force to be a "foundation on which we can and should build up knowledge about, and analysis of, rape and war", though also found it "difficult reading" due to the "essential horror" of the descriptions. Armstrong wondered "if some of this material could be reduced...in favour of increasing the presentation of statistical information". This is echoed by Kathleen J. Ferraro of Contemporary Sociology, who "became somewhat numb from the repetition of graphic depictions of rape in each country" and felt that "it would have been helpful to have further analysis of the conditions that aggravate or reduce wartime rape."

== Publication history ==
The book was published in France in 2003 before the United States. The title of the original book is La face cachée des GI’s [sic]. Les viols commis par des soldats américains en France, en Angleterre et en Allemagne pendant la Seconde Guerre mondiale (The hidden face of the GIs. Rapes committed by American soldiers in France, England and Germany during World War II). The American edition contains twenty-one pages of introduction, including acknowledgements, foreword, and a preface to the English and French edition. According to the book reviewer for the Australian Army Journal, the author of the French preface "goes to extremes to point out that this book was selected for the French market before being accepted in the US market because of American distaste towards negative stories relating to the US military."
