= Time of Fallen Blossoms =

1951 book written by Allan S. Clifton

- Author: Allan S. Clifton
- Genre: Memoir
- Publication date: 1951

Time of Fallen Blossoms is 1951 book written by Allan S. Clifton. Clifton was an Australian intelligence officer with the British Commonwealth Occupation Force. It is a memoir of his time in Japan in 1946 during the post-war occupation. Clifton had studied Japanese for 12 years and worked as an interpreter. His book contained accounts of Australian soldiers' mistreatment of Japanese Prisoners of War (POWs) after the Japanese surrender and gang rapes of Japanese women by Australian soldiers in Japan. The book was controversial in Australia as a result, and he was subsequently discredited by the Australian Army.

The book received renewed attention in 2016 when a passage was referenced in a tweet by Australian journalist Scott McIntyre about Australian war crimes in his criticism of Anzac Day.

== Structure ==
- Preface
- Chapter 1 Arrival
  - Covers Clifton's arrival in Iwakuni and trip to Kure.
- Chapter 2 Train Journey
  - An initial description of bombed-out Kure and Clifton's train trip to deliver a letter from a Japanese POW in Borneo to his wife in Kisa.
- Chapter 3 Ujina
  - A description of life in Ujina, servants and their examination for venereal disease, the surprising existence of coed public toilets.
- Chapter 4 'Moose'
  - Acting as a translator of love letters between soldiers and local women. Information about camp followers, who were referred to as "moose", perhaps derived from "musume", meaning "daughter" in Japanese. Information about officers using brothels in a more discreet fashion than men of lower ranks.
- Chapter 5 Treasure Island
  - Takes one of the three boats assigned to the occupation forces to visit Kanawa, a nearby island. It contained very large stores of looted items from the territories formerly controlled by Japan. Takes many things back to camp.
- Chapter 6 'Pikadon'
  - The background of Hiroshima Prefecture, an account of the atomic bombing by a fisherman who survived it, descriptions of survivors.
- Chapter 7 Fire within, Fire Without
  - Took some officers' sheets to be hemmed, strikes up a friendship with Hiroko, the seamstress who also works as a prostitute.
- Chapter 8 'Wogging'
  - Deals with the black market, and sells items via an acquaintance who was a restaurant-keeper.
- Chapter 9 Elections
  - March, waiting for cherry blossoms and participates in the preparations for Japan's first post-war elections in villages around Yoshida in rural Hiroshima prefecture. Stays at an inn run by a couple. The innkeeper's retired parents live with there also.
- Chapter 10 Truly Rural
  - Discussion of the village system. Experiencing rural life in Yoshida and surrounding areas, encounters Japanese badger/rabbit hunters who protect the rice fields, information about Jizo statues, and receives many small gifts.
- Chapter 11 Yoshida
  - Discussion with the inn-keeper's father. Struggles to explain democracy to a chemist, which reminds him of Francis Xavier in Japan and how Xavier said answering questions was very important. The election takes place with most candidates being independents.
- Chapter 12 Devil's Language
  - Returns to Ujima to find the black market is more developed. Many troops seek female companionship, and large noses are considered attractive by Japanese women. Reflects on Francis Xavier's comment that the Japanese language was "invented by the devil".
- Chapter 13 The Hall of Victorious Return
  - Repatriated exhausted former Japanese POWs arrive back to a hall built to receive them as heroes. Receives a letter from Nagase, whose letter he delivered in chapter two. Nagase is moving to Kyoto and invites Clifton to visit him there.
- Chapter 14 Honeymoon for Three
  - Organizing the marriage of a soldier named Harry and Terumi, a local woman.
- Chapter 15 A Night Out
  - Visit to a local social club suspected of being a front for resistance.
- Chapter 16 British Justice (chapter incomplete)
  - The restaurant-keeper Clifton used for the black market is charged and sent to prison for nine months. He dies quickly inside prison.
- Chapter 17 Indian Summer
  - The heat of the Japanese summer, how Clifton doesn't steal. He writes an opinion article for the Yukan Hiroshima newspaper and receives a lot of fan mail. He strikes up a friendship with Chieko, a woman who wanted to marry an Australian soldier Clifton doesn't approve of.
- Chapter 18 Police
  - Experiences with the Japanese police, whom he admires. Dealing with Koreans and Chinese.
- Chapter 19 Fifth Column
  - More experiences with Koreans. Finding a store of explosives.
- Chapter 20 Yabanjin
  - Detailed accounts of rapes, assaults, thefts and general bullying by Australian occupation troops in Hiroshima. Australians became known as "yabanjin", meaning "savage" in Japanese. Clifton attributes these actions partly to the low quality of many of the troops sent to Japan for the occupation and a lack of discipline. Crimes were generally not prosecuted or quashed by Australian authorities. In one case a soldier charged with rape was sentenced to 10 years in a court-martial. The verdict was quashed in Australia due to "insufficient evidence".
- Chapter 21 Marooned
  - Some local figures ask him to help them obtain some large former Japanese Navy oil tanks that were abandoned during the war and now belonging to the occupation forces. Meets a geisha, the only one that he encounters during his time in Japan.
- Chapter 22 The Fruits of Autumn
  - Speaks about how Australian soldiers would "requisition" beer from the brewery on the outskirts of town. Rides a train to the countryside with his friend Harry on a visit to Harry's wife Terumi. Drunken Australian soldiers cause trouble on the train. Japanese police avoid seizing black market rice from a woman because she was in Clifton's company.
- Chapter 23 Apologia
  - Clifton's thoughts on Japan and the Japanese, how the seeds of the Pearl Harbor attack were planted in Perry and his black ships forcing Japan open to the world.
- Chapter 24 Operation Foxum
  - After a number of drunken brawls soldiers were barred from many places, and eventually every building in the prefecture. There were armed robberies by soldiers, after which they were not allowed to use the trains. Mets John Hersey and briefly acts as a translator for him while researching the book Hiroshima. During August Clifton steals a carved wooden mask from a ruined temple. He felt guilty and after stumbling into a graveyard, leaves the mask there. Description of Hiroshima station's surroundings at night, with large numbers of lovers, prostitutes, black marketeers and poor children. The incidence of venereal disease increased and provosts had the right to arrest and take to the hospital any woman suspected of being a carrier of disease. Prostitution had been banned in Japan and "Operation Foxum" was a BCOF operation to check that businesses were not officially operating as brothels and that no women were being kept against their will. While women were not owned as they had been before the occupation, unscrupulous inn-keepers still exploited them.
- Chapter 25 Education
  - The second part of "Operation Foxum" was an inspection of schools to ensure that their teachers were in line with SCAP's orders. He is assigned to monitor phone calls from schools to see if they are being warned, which they are not. He visits schools and finds nothing to object to. New textbooks are simply reprintings of old books with the anti-allied sections removed, or simply the old textbook with objectionable content blacked out. He is surprised to see psychoanalysis being taught to 15-year-olds. A mention that later the Tokyo daily newspapers ceased publication for some days to donate paper for the printing of new textbooks. Is impressed by the enthusiasm of the children and their lack of fear. Notes that rural schools are in a better state than the urban ones, as the farmers were quite well-off at this time.
- Chapter 26 Tokyo
  - After problems among translators (suicide attempts, insanity) the BCOF translators were examined by a psychiatrist and given some time off. They were sent to Tokyo, and from there to the Lakeside Hotel in Nikko, Tochigi Prefecture. This irritates Clifton as he had wanted to catch up with some Japanese friends in Tokyo. After seeing the sights in Nikko he manages to return to Tokyo and look up Koichi Ito, his old friend who was private secretary to the minister to Australia at the time of Pearl Harbor. Ito had been against war, and was removed from his duties after returning to Japan. Clifton discovers that he was killed by the strafing of an American fighter while in Nagano looking for work. He was on a train at a station. He tried to visit Ito's family but was unable to find them. He then looks up Shigemori, a wealthy character who had also returned to Japan. He was alive and well and Clifton spends three days with him and his wife. He receives a letter from Terumi, who has been raped by two drunk soldiers. Soon after Harry is drowned in the Seto Inland Sea after falling from a launch.
- Chapter 27 Sayonara
  - The return to Australia by ship from Kure, last remembrances of Japan.
