= So Far from the Bamboo Grove =

Book by Yoko Kawashima Watkins

- First edition
- Author: Yoko Kawashima Watkins
- Cover artist: Leo and Diane Dillon
- Language: English
- Genre: War novel, non-fiction
- Publisher: William Morrow
- Publication date: April 1986
- Publication place: United States
- Media type: Print (hard & paperback)
- Pages: 192 pp
- ISBN: 978-0-688-13115-9
- OCLC: 426064992
- LC Class: PZ7.W3235 So 1994
- Followed by: My Brother, My Sister, and I

So Far from the Bamboo Grove is an autobiography written by Yoko Kawashima Watkins, a Japanese American writer. It was originally published by Beech Tree in April 1986.

Watkins's book takes place in the last days of 35 years of Korea's annexation by Japan. An eleven-year-old Japanese girl, Yoko Kawashima, whose father works for the Japanese government, must leave her home in Nanam, part of northern Korea, as her family escapes south to Seoul, then to Busan, to return to Japan.

== Plot summary ==
The story begins with Yoko Kawashima (and her mother, brother and sister) living in Nanam. Yoko is 11 years old and living in North Korea during World War II while their father works as a Japanese government official in Manchuria, China. As the war draws towards a close, Yoko and her family realize the danger of their situation and attempts to escape back to Japan as communist troops close in on North Korea.

Her brother, Hideyo, also tries to leave but he is separated from his family because he has to serve at an ammunition factory for six days a week. The women of the family board a train to Seoul using a letter from a family diplomat but their trip is cut short by a bomb 45 miles away from Seoul. Yoko is injured from the bombing and the women are forced to walk the rest of the way. After receiving medical treatment in Seoul, Yoko, her sister, and mother board a train to Busan, and then a ship to Japan.

When Yoko, her sister Ko, and her mother reach Fukuoka, Japan, it is not the beautiful, comforting, welcoming place Yoko dreamed of. Once again, they find themselves living in a train station scrounging in the garbage for food to survive. Eventually, Yoko's mother travels to Kyoto to find her family. She then leaves for Aomori to seek help from their grandparents who she discovers are both dead. Their mother dies on the same day, leaving Yoko and Ko waiting for their brother Hideyo. Their mother's last words were to keep their wrapping cloth where she had hidden money for her children.

Yoko begins to attend a new school where she enters and wins an essay contest with a cash prize. News of her winning the contest is reported in the newspaper. Hideyo and the Korean family who took bid farewell and Hideyo finally reaches Busan where he finds the message left to him by Yoko. After reaching Japan, he sees signs with his name and Yoko and Ko's address. While asking directions from locals, he is spotted by Yoko and they are reunited.

Kawashima also wrote a sequel titled My Brother, My Sister, and I.

== Translations ==
A Korean version of this book titled Yoko iyagi (요코이야기, "Yoko's tale") was published in 2005 and sold 4,000 copies of the first printing. However, it was banned soon after.

A Japanese version of this book, Takebayashi haruka tōku: Nihonjin shōjo Yōko no sensō taikenki (竹林はるか遠く : 日本人少女ヨーコの戦争体験記, "Bamboo grove far distant: Japanese girl Yōko's war experience account") became available in June 2013. In June 2013, the book reached No. 1 on the Amazon Best Sellers in Books in Japan.

== Controversy ==
=== Response in Boston ===
The issue came to head after 2006, when 13 parents of Korean-American students in a Greater Boston community urged the book be removed from the English curriculum of Dover-Sherborn Middle School, resulting in the convening of a review committee that included the middle school librarian and two English teachers, which recommended removing the book from school curriculum in November 2006. A hearing in the Dover-Sherborn Regional School Committee was later held which took no action and instead referred the matter to a subcommittee for review. The book was later kept in the curriculum to be used in tandem with other books on Korean history for a more balanced experience.

The parents' have complained that the book is "racist and sexually explicit" containing historical inaccuracies that whitewashed Japanese atrocities against Koreans during the Japanese Occupation. During the hearing of the School Committee on the proposed book ban one parent said he didn't think rape and other war atrocities were appropriate subject matter for young children. When talking of a scene in the book where a Japanese girl is being raped by a Korean man, the parent brought up worries that this would lead children to have a certain impression of Korean men, saying, "The first impression you imprint in a child's mind is typically very hard to erase." (Note: Exact language in Kocian's piece in the Boston Globe: "..it will be the students' first exposure to Asian history"; and "You'll notice throughout the book these acts are committed by Korean men -- it is a pretty disturbing connotation of a group of people",... "The first impression you imprint in a child's mind is typically very hard to erase".)

A Boston councilman (Note: Sam Yoon. The Dover parents were not actually his constituents, as the Kiang & Tang (2009) study noted.) also weighed in, stating that the Korean minority were being portrayed as the "bad guys", even though Japan was the one who had occupied Korea.

Both the School Committee members and the parents said they had no objection to the book remaining in the school library.

Although some staunch supporters of the book were teachers and parents who saw the issue as a matter of literary censorship rather than historical revisionism and distortion, the middle school headmaster who was on the book review committee said the panel struggled with its recommendation adding that there wasn't enough time in school to properly explore the issues raised by the book. Other supporters who coalesced around anti-censorship issue were Kathy Glick-Weil, president of the Massachusetts Library Association and director of the Newton Free Library, and Deborah Caldwell-Stone, deputy director of the American Library Association's Office for Intellectual Freedom.

=== Response in California ===
In 2009, Korean-American school parents submitted a complaint to the California Department of Education regarding inclusion of So Far From the Bamboo Grove in the school curriculum on grounds that the novel contained historical inaccuracies, including accounts of Japanese female victims of rape perpetrated by Koreans. The state of California gave school parents an opportunity to offer opinions and ultimately decided to remove the novel as a school curriculum option in the state. Around 50 K-12 Korean-American students who attended the Young Korean American Academy wrote letters to the state education offices and publishers asking for greater exposure of Korean history and culture, with McGraw-Hill sending back a response letter promising to implement students' requests.

=== Response in Korea ===
When the book was published in Korea as Yoko iyagi (요코 이야기, "Yoko's tale") in 2005, the sales were brisk partly due to a sales copy that said "why was this book banned in China and Japan?", but there was not much discernible social uproar about it.

There had even been positive reviews written about it, accepting the book as delivering an anti-war and anti-colonial message.

The situation completely changed in 2007, when it became a target of intense debate in Korea and in the United States. This development was triggered by the protests lodged by Korean-American students in the Greater Boston area in September 2006.

=== Other schools ===
Even prior to the Dover-Sherborn Middle School's decision to suspend the book, there have been other challenges tracked by the American Library Association, some of which have been successful in removing the book from the curriculum and reading lists. Rye Country Day School in New York had acted swiftly by banning the book in September, 2006.

One Catholic school and one private school, both in Massachusetts removed the book from their curricula in 2007. A teacher at the latter (Note: Friends Academy, North Dartmouth, Massachusetts.) wrote an opinion on the book which appeared in The English Journal.

The school board of Montgomery County, Maryland struck the book off its recommended list in March 2007.

=== Watkins' response ===
Watkins said that she had no intention of disregarding the history of Korea and apologized for any hard feelings felt by Korean readers. She stated her intention was to portray her childhood experiences in a softer way for young readers, and denied the accusations made by the Korean newspapers.

== Unreliable historical facts ==
The Korean media has characterized her book as "autobiographical fiction". It has believed there are several unreliable points in her account. Certain "Korean historians" (unspecified) charge that some of her narrated incidents are imagined. However, the author insists she wrote her experience as she remembered it.

=== U.S. bombers ===
Watkins gives in her book an account of sighting U.S. B-29 bombers (identified as that type by Mr. Enomoto). This has been characterized as suspect, since according to historians, there were no bombing in the area in July or August 1945. Watkins retorted that she did not go so far as to say these airplanes bombarded her hometown of Nanam (Rannam), but that she had simply witnessed them fly over.

In fact, U.S. bombers were flying missions to the general area of Korea by this time, according to Yoshio Morita's book on evacuation from Korea: "From July 12 [1945] onward, American B-29's came almost every other day and regularly around 11:AM assaulting Rajin and Ungi in Northeast Korea, dropping many mines into the harbor". (Note: Quote in Japanese:「[二十年]七月十二日以後、沖縄を基地とするアメリカのB29は、ほとんど隔日に、しかもきまって午後十一時ごろ、東北鮮の羅津、雄基に来襲し、そのつど多数の機雷を港内に投下していた。それ以前には"」)

An airplane attack on the train Yoko was aboard occurred, although she has not claimed she was able to identify the aircraft as American. On this point, Korean media cast suspicion on this passage as anachronistic, since "American military did not bomb any part of North Korea during the time frame of the story". The train was stalled by the attack 45 miles before reaching Seoul.

=== Korean communist presence ===
Also, when pressed, she admitted she could not identify the armed uniformed militia that her family encountered as definitively "Korean Communists", although that was the label she has given to her posing threat throughout the book. She explained that this had been the assumption she had made after hearing that the areas left behind in her trail had been overrun by communists. The book, in a different context, (Note: In relation to the army eminent domaining some farmers' lands to expand its hospital.) describes the mother telling Yoko that Koreans had formed what is known as an "Anti-Japanese Communist Army". (Note: "Anti-Japanese Communist Army" (kōnichi kyōsangun, 抗日共産軍) has been used elsewhere to designate China's People's Liberation Army. The Japanese of course would not dignify using Communist China's official name as the people's army.)

Harvard historian Carter Eckert had considered these points, and stated the only organized Korean "Communist Army" around this time would have been the guerrillas led by Soviet-trained Kim Il Sung, who "did not arrive in Korea until early September 1945", but there might have been "local Korean communist groups" present.

However, there was already a report that on August 8, (Note: The day Russia formally declared war on Japan) a Korean contingent of 80 strong men was spotted with the Soviet Army, crossing the border into To-ri (土里; Japanese: Dori). (Note: The group assaulted a police station in To-ri, and killed two Japanese officers.) It was only a short distance by speedboat across the Tumen River for them to arrive from Russia to this town. (Note: This town was about 60 miles north of Nanam, where Yoko lived.) But in historical facts, defense of the Japanese army was solid and so Soviet troops reached Nanam from the sea side on August 12 and captured this city on August 17.

"Korean Communist soldiers" were bereft of their uniforms for Yoko, her sister, and mother to use as disguise in the book. (Note: The locations is several nights' walk closer to Seoul than where their train derailed.) Some media coverage gave a forced reading saying this term can only have applicable meaning as soldiers of the "Korean People's Army", not established until 1948, so that Yoko was describing uniforms nonexistent at the time.

=== Security situation ===
The author describes an incident that occurred after Japan’s surrender, in which Japanese women who had gathered at a warehouse in Busan while attempting to return to Japan were assaulted and some of them were raped by Korean mobs.However, the Japan army in Korea had not been disarmed until the U.S. military arrived in Korea and established military rule.One Korean newspaper insisted it was considered unlikely that such an incident actually occurred.

== Awards ==
Watkins was awarded the Literary Lights for Children Award by Associates of the Boston Public Library in 1998 and also the Courage of Conscience Award by the Peace Abbey.

== See also ==
- Repatriation
- Futsukaichi Rest Home

== Bibliography ==
- Kiang, Peter; Tang, Shirley (2009), "Transnational Dimensions of Community Empowerment: The Victories of Chanrithy Uong and Sam Yoon", in Collet; Lien (eds.), The Transnational Politics of Asian Americans, Temple University Press, pp. 88–91, ISBN 9781592138623pdf
- Lee, Hye Kyoung (李恵慶) (2014). "Tekusuto wo uragiru tekusuto: Takebayashi haruka tōku ni okeru sensō no kioku to kioku no sensō" テクストを裏切るテクスト―『sensō 』における戦争の記憶と記憶の戦争 [Memory, Nostalgia and Nationalism: Unlocking The Textual Unconscious in Yoko Kawashima Watkins's So Far From The Bamboo Grove] (PDF). Asia-Pacific Review アジア太平洋レビュー (in Japanese) (11): 38–52. (published by the Osaka University of Economics and Law)
- Morita, Yoshio (森田芳夫) (1964). Chōsen shūsen no kiroku: Bei So ryōgun to nihonjin no hikiage 朝鮮終戦の記錄: 米ソ両軍の進駐と日本人の引揚 (in Japanese). Gannando.
- Watkins, Yoko Kawashima (1994) [1986]. So Far from the Bamboo Grove. Harper Collins. ISBN 978-0-6881-3115-9.
