= Futsukaichi Rest Home =

1946–1947 medical facility in Japan

Coordinates: 33.488155°N 130.515649°E

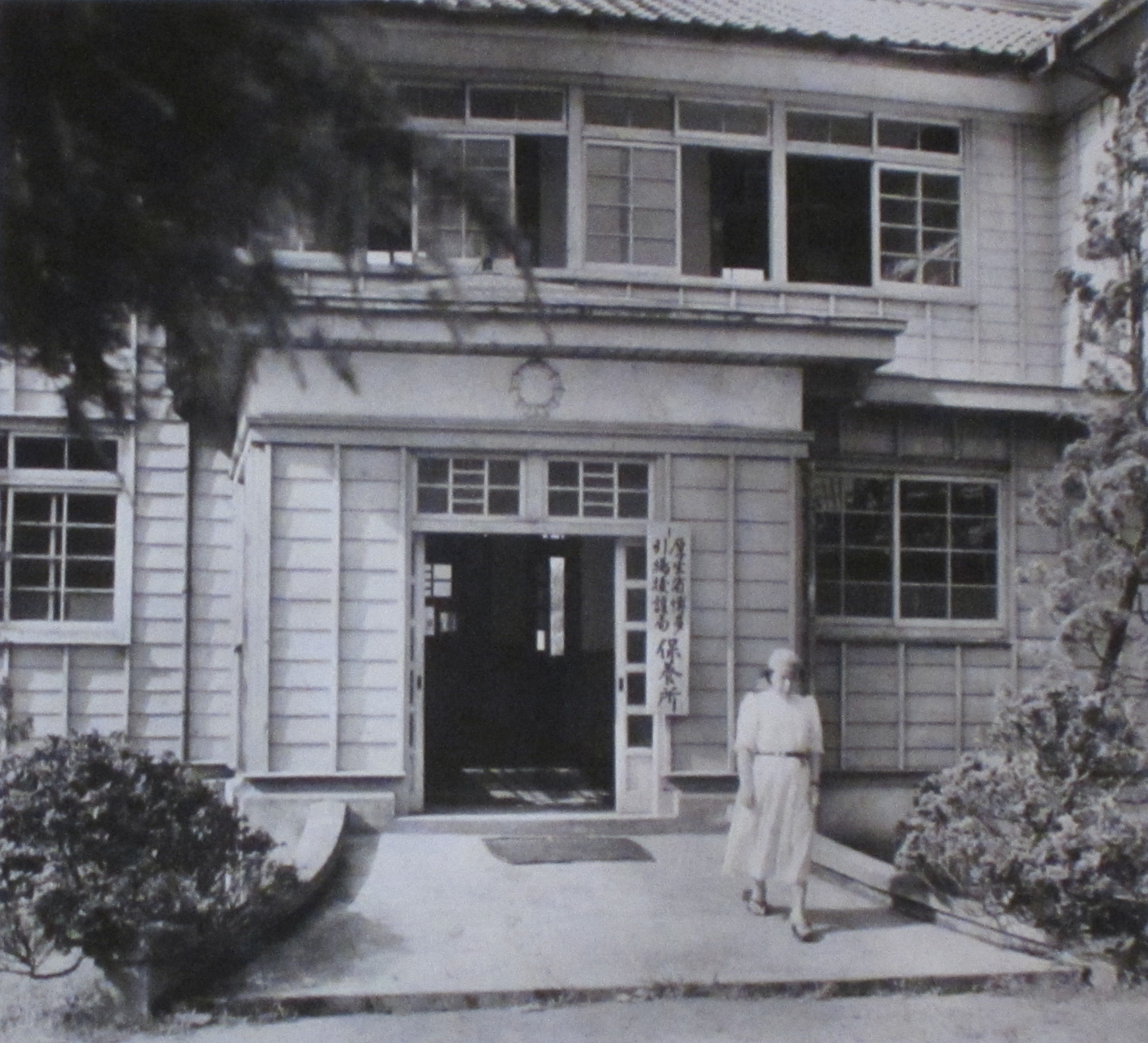
Entrance of Futsukaichi Rest Home

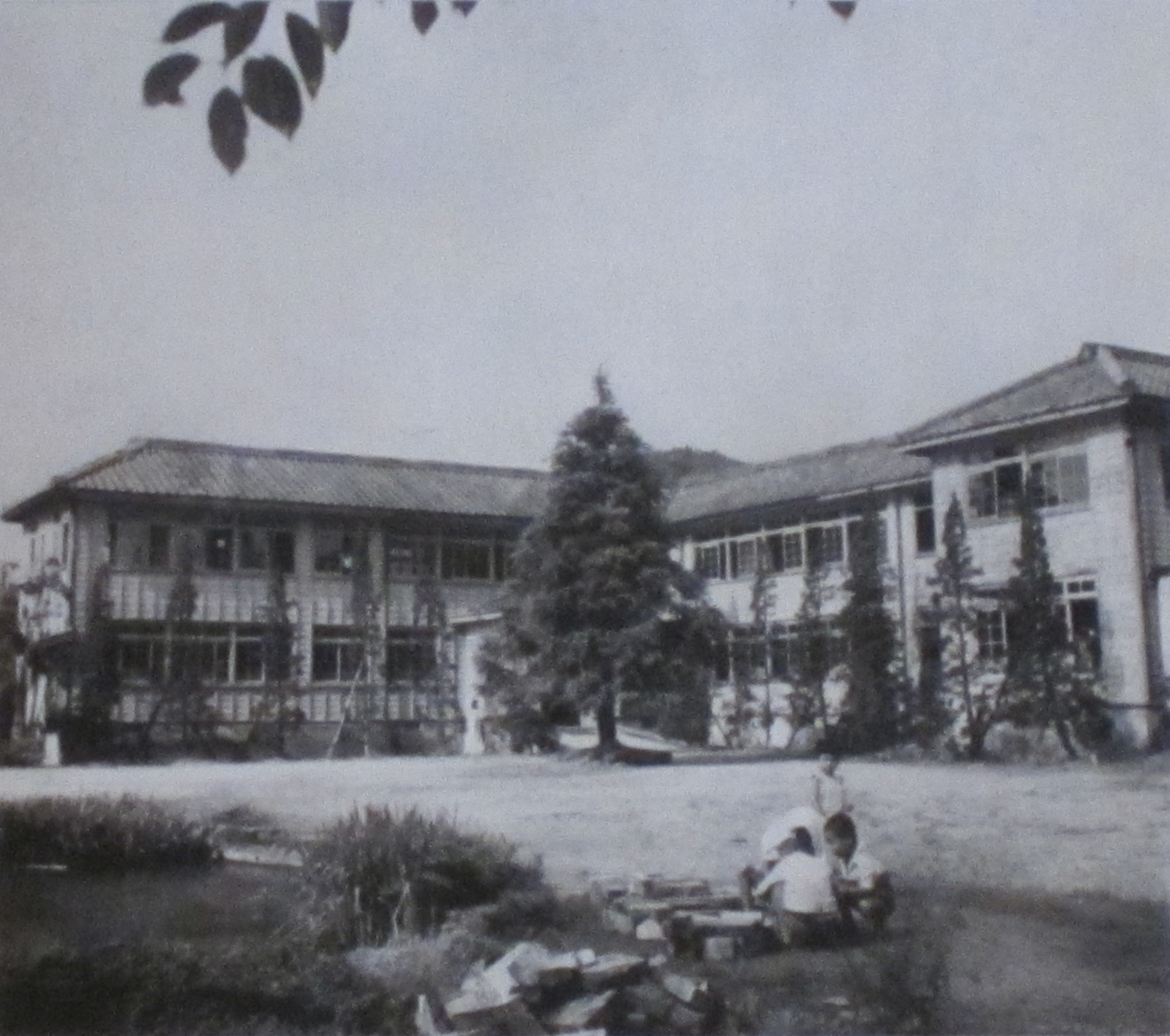
Futsukaichi Rest Home

Futsukaichi Rest Home (二日市保養所, Futsukaichi Hoyōjo) was a specialized medical facility located in the town of Futsukaichi (present day-Chikushino, Fukuoka), Japan, set up in 1946 by the Ministry of Welfare after World War II. It operated for 1.5 years and performed abortions before they were legalized in 1947, and treated sexually transmitted diseases (STDs, such as syphilis or gonorrhea) in rape survivors who were repatriated from China or Korea.

Futsukaichi clinic, or Futsuka’ichi Sanatorium are some of its other designations in English.

== Background ==
After the end of World War II, Japanese citizens who had migrated to occupied areas had to return to mainland Japan. During the repatriation from China or Korea, they were vulnerable to violence, exposure, and malnutrition.

One of the pioneers at organizing medical help for these refugees was anthropologist Seiichi Izumi, who is sometimes credited with being the actual figure who later created the Repatriate Aid Society's "medical corp" (救療部, kyūryō bu), the people who operated the Futsukaichi clinic.

In the immediate postwar Korea, he organized a network of mobile medical teams to help Japanese refugee in transit from Seoul to Busan. The teams were also posted at major entry ports for repatriates in Japan. Izumi called this network the "mobile medical bureau" (移動医療局, Idō Iryōkyoku), although it carried the English name of MRU (Medical Relief Union). It was sanctioned by the Allied troops. This MRU is considered the precursor to the kyūryō bu medical corp that later staffed the Futsukaichi clinic.

The Pusan Nihonjin sewakai ("Busan Relief Society", "Busan Homeland Japanese Support Organization", etc.,) and the MRU have been conducting surveys on the medically examined women refugees since December 1945. The figures for March 1946 showed that out of the 885 women surveyed, roughly 10 percent had been sexually assaulted (70 rape survivors and 19 STD-infected individuals). Izumi was aware of the scale of problem he would be faced with.

== Establishment ==
The Futsukaichi clinic was started by a group of doctors at Japanese imperial university in Seoul and activists (Note: This would include Seiichi Izumi) who after returning to Japan wanted to assist the refugees, with the help of a semi-governmental Repatriate Aid Society aligned with the Japanese foreign ministry.

The staff of the former Keijō Imperial University School of Medicine in Seoul had been treating Japanese refugees stranded in Korea, but most were back in Japan by December 1945, and wished to continue their services by treating the displaced repatriates. (Note: The repatriates were called hikiagesha by the Japanese) Also referred to as the "Seoul Group", (Note: The term is defined in Watt (2010), p. 114 and includes activists and the photographer IIyama Tatsuo.) these doctors negotiated how to achieve this purpose with the Repatriate Aid Society (在外同胞援護会, Zaigai dōhō engokai; "The aid society for overseas Japanese"), an extra-departmental body of the Ministry of Foreign Affairs. As end-result, the Seoul Group became integrated as the Society's medical corp. (Note: They then opened the Shōfuku Hospital clinic at the Zen temple Shōfuku-ji, in March 1946.)

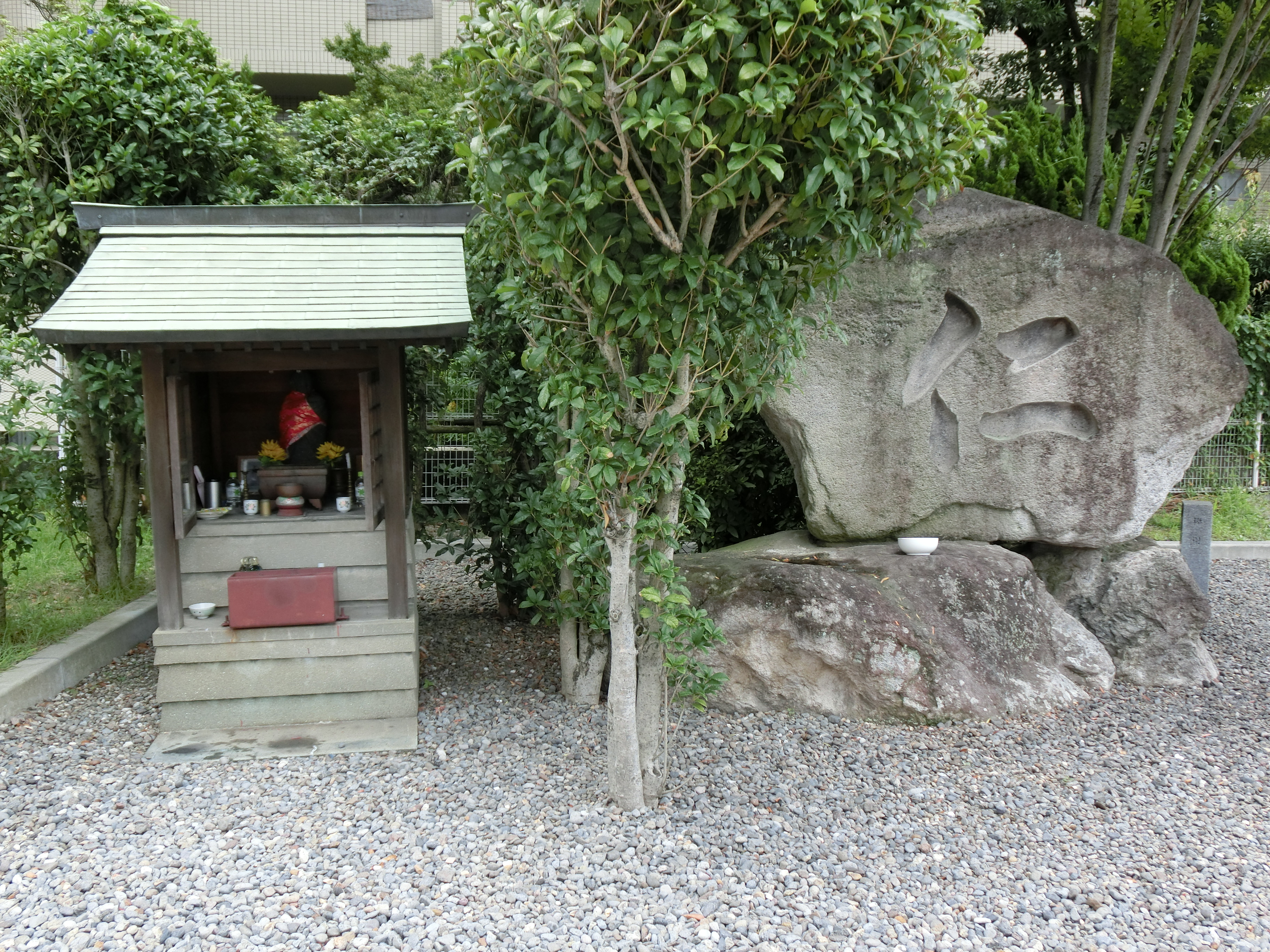
Futsukaichi Rest Home monuments in 2015

The Seoul Group, now known as the Repatriate Aid Society's "medical corp", (Note: Zaigai dōhō engokai kyūryō bu (在外同胞援護会救療部).) dispatched physicians to the repatriation ships. The ship doctors observed that most of the evacuees were those who fled Northern Korea, and particularly the girls and women were in miserable states; many had been violated during their flight, and as a result had contracted sexually transmitted diseases or had become pregnant, with no measures in place for providing relief. This report was made to the Hakata Regional Repatriation Center (博多引揚援護局, Hakata hikiage engo kyoku), a bureau under the Ministry of Welfare, with recommendation to build a specialize medical facility for treating sexually assaulted women, who required disceet abortions. With cooperation from both the Relief Aid Society and the center, the Futsukaichi Rest Home was opened March 25, 1946.

The facility was located in Futsukaichi, a quiet and secluded hot-spring area near Hakata port in Fukuoka, (Note: "This sparse and quiet rest home where a hot spring spouts, was an optimal place for assuaging the spiritual and bodily injuries these violate women suffered (温泉の湧くこの閑静な保養所は凌辱された婦人達の心身の傷を癞すには最適の地であった)") where the largest number of repatriates arrived. The building was converted from the Musashi Hot Springs Rest House once owned by the prefectural chapter of the "Patriotic Women's Association. It was a wooden, two-storey building with 14 or 15 units available as patient's rooms on the second floor.

Two doctors and ten nurses (including three midwives) from the Repatriate Aid Society staffed it. Similar facilities were placed at the Kyushu Imperial University School of Medicine, National Fukuoka Sanatorium, Kurume Medical School, National Saga Sanatorium, and Nakahara Army Sanatorium in Saga Prefecture.

== Facility operation ==
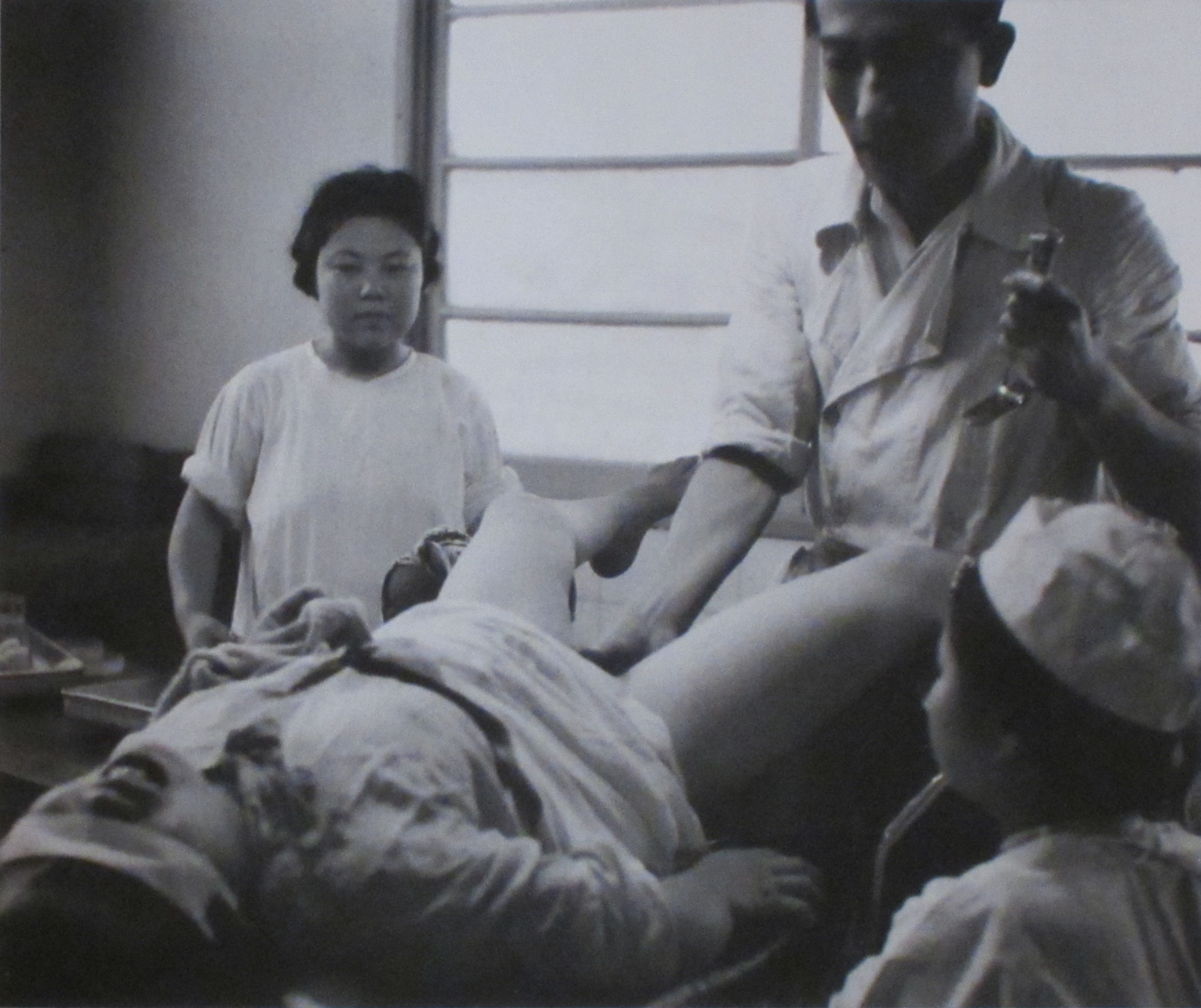
Abortion at Futsukaichi Sanatorium in 1947

One of the major issues faced by the society was how to make the facility known to the victims. The society handed out flyers in repatriation ships, but carefully selected their wording. The flyer said: "Attention all unfortunate women! If you have been bodily injured by unlawful violence or threat.. and your body is feeling abnormalities.. then we will admit you to a clinic and return you to your home country with a sound body, so please contact the ship's physician". (Note: Japanese text:「不幸なるご婦人方へ至急ご注意！」..「不法な暴力と脅迫により身を傷つけられたり......そのため体に異常を感じつつある方は......」「診療所へ収容し、健全なる体として故郷へご送還するので、船医にお申し出下さい」) For women who had already returned to Japan, the group placed advertisement with similar circumloquacious text in influential newspapers. (Note: In the Nishi Nihon Shimbun, July 17, 1946. Reproduced in Kamitsubo (1979) Mizuko no uta.)

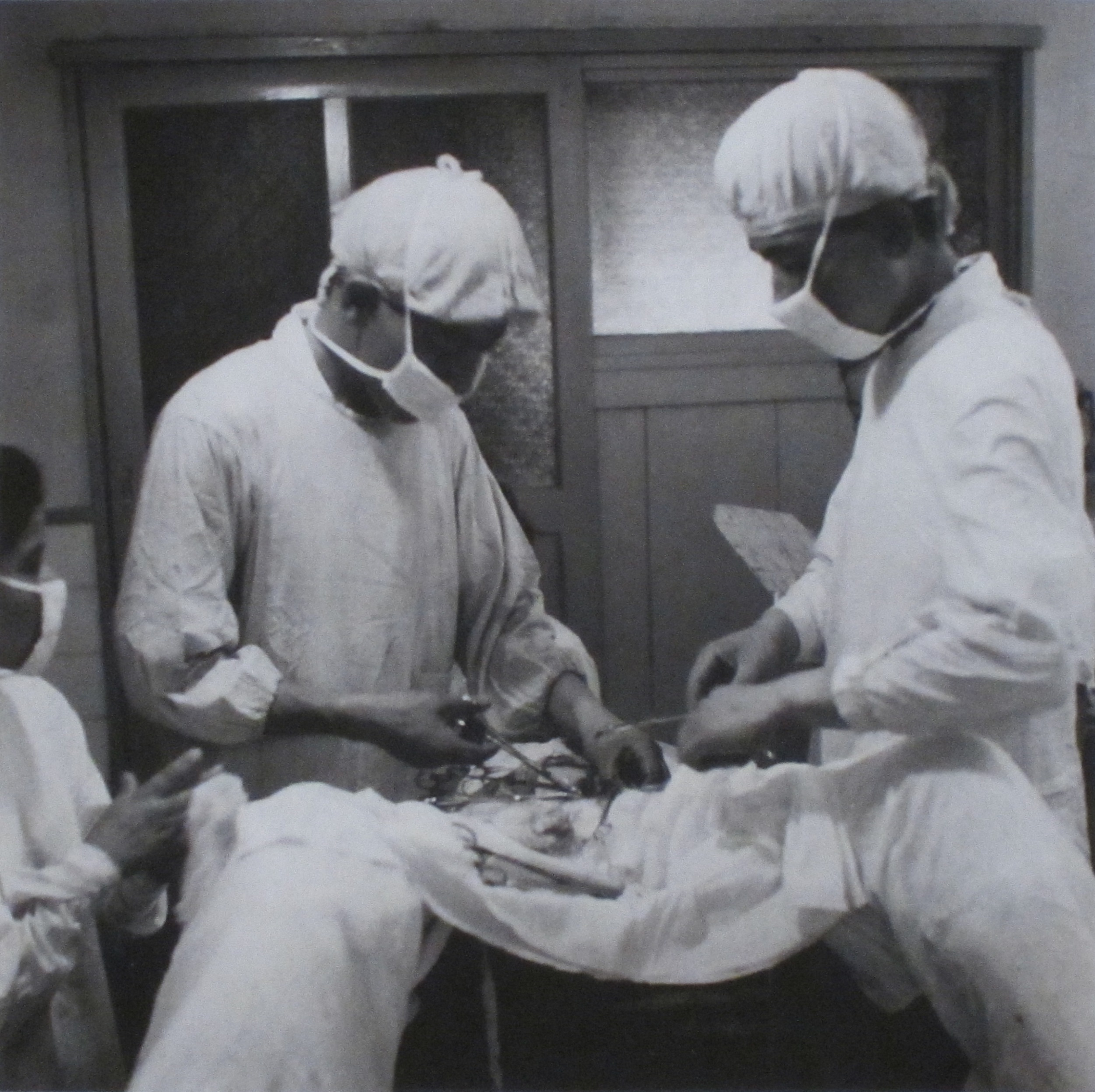
Caesarean section surgery at Futsukaichi Sanatorium before Autumn 1947

At Hakata port, the Hakata Regional Repatriation Center set up the Hakata Quarantine Station and Feminine Health Advice Center (博多検疫所女子健康相談所, Hakata ken'ekijo joshi kenkosōdansho) on April 25, 1946, which referred pregnancies (illegal pregnancies) and STD cases to the Futsukaichi or Fukuoka Rest Home. The Ministry of Health and Welfare issued verbal orders to its workers that all women disembarking at Hakata port were to be screened for pregnancy. (Note: In the case of Sasebo port, the associate professor of the university hospital would be summoned by the Ministry of Health and Welfare and be ordered to do the abortions.)

During the facility's one-and-a-half year working period, the medical team carried out an estimated 400–500 abortions. (Note: The "Center's history" (Kyokushi) states that from March 1946 to the end of 1946 (9 month period), it treated 380 patients, broken down into unlawful pregnancies 218, ordinary pregnancies 87, STD 35, and miscellaneous 45. Conclusion that over 500 patients for STDs may derive from one of the sources which states "the number of gynecology patients suffering from STD, etc. are estimated to be of equal number [as the abortions] (性病その他の婦人科疾患の患者数も同じ位あったと推定され)".)

Because of the shortage of medication, patients sometimes had to accept operations without anesthesia that was potentially lethal. The rest house operated until fall 1947, just before the Japanese government passed an amendment to the Eugenic Protection Act 1948 which allowed abortions in cases of rape or on eugenics grounds.

== See also ==
- Repatriation
- So Far from the Bamboo Grove
