= Rape during the liberation of Serbia =

Use of sexual assault as an act of war during WWII

In late 1944 and early 1945, rapes were committed against women by the Soviet Red Army soldiers during their advance to Berlin through Serbia during the Second World War.

== Soviets during liberation of Belgrade ==
Milovan Đilas spoke about these events at the end of World War II in his memoirs. The Germans began to retreat, and mass rapes by members of the Red Army began. There was also a case where a mother-in-law was killed because she did not want to free the bed for the rape of her daughter-in-law. Soviet soldiers were repeatedly breaking into apartments and houses in Belgrade and the surrounding area, and they were making decisions on which soldier would rape the daughter and which would rape the mother. In order to avoid rape, women and girls hid in attics, sewers, holes in the ground, sheds and basements.

The situation was so bad that Tito requested a personal audience with Stalin through Đilas, asking him to stop the wave of rapes of Yugoslav women. Stalin, the head of the Kremlin at the time, told him: "Young guys are young guys, they've been through the war and they need a little rest." Jovanka Broz testifies to this with a testimony written down by Senad Pećanin. Tito presented the problem to the head of the Soviet military mission, General Nikolai Korneyev, "in a very polite and relaxed way", in addition to the rape, he also complained about the banditry and arrogant behavior of the soldiers. However, Korneyev immediately began to protest about the "slander against the Soviet army". Stalin was also offended by the "slandering" of the Red Army by the Yugoslav allies and the conflict with Tito only deepened later. The same crimes took place in other liberated territories, and rapes of German, Polish, Lithuanian, Estonian, Latvian women are well known. It is estimated that the Soviets raped over 2 million women across Europe.

Serbian journalist Vuk Perišić said about the rapes: "The rapes were extremely brutal, under the influence of alcohol and usually by a group of soldiers. The Soviet soldiers did not pay attention to the fact that Serbia was their ally, and there is no doubt that the Soviet high command tacitly approved the rape."

== Statistics ==
The number of rapes, in a period of several months, taking into account that the Soviets passed only through the northeastern regions of Serbia, speaks of the mass of these crimes. By the end of 1944 there were 1,219 rapes, 359 attempted rapes, 111 rapes with murder, and 248 rapes with attempted murder in Serbia. On the territory of Belgrade until 1945, over 2,000 rapes were reported. The total number is estimated at over 5,000 women and girls who suffered sexual violence and abuse.

== Research on sexual crimes on the territory of Serbia ==
Estimating cases of sexual violence is extremely difficult, and various researchers have used different methods to arrive at widely differing estimates. In Serbia, based on two different quotes from the official number of reported rapes received by the Yugoslav authorities, it is estimated that Red Army soldiers abused between 2,420 and 24,380 women during their stay in the country.

Evidence shows that Serbs and Yugoslavs were much less afraid of the Red Army than Austrians, Poles, Germans, Hungarians and Romanians. Soviet soldiers and officers reported that Bulgarians would call them "brothers". This can be most contrasted with the behavior of the Soviet troops in Romania, where they raped an estimated 355,200 women. Also, the number of raped women in Hungary varies from 50,000 to 500,000 according to different sources. In Austria, between 70,000 and 110,000 women were raped in Vienna alone.

Susan Brownsmiller noted that the liberation armies treated women in Serbia better than those in enemy countries.

=== Soviet propaganda about Serbia and Yugoslavia ===
The pan-Slavic theme in Soviet propaganda was intended to encourage Soviet soldiers to view Serbs as a brotherly people. Soviet propaganda also drew the soldiers' attention to German crimes against Yugoslav and Serbian civilians with the aim of inciting hatred towards the Germans.

Tito asked Korneyev to immediately take measures to at least reduce incidents of robbery, rape and violence. Milovan Đilas stated that the complaints bore fruit and that the Soviet officers reacted more violently to the transgressions of their soldiers after the meeting with Korneyev and Stalin's participation.
