= Allied war crimes during World War II =

War crimes committed by Allied personnel in World War II

There are many reported war crimes committed by Allied military forces in World War II. The armed forces of the Soviet Union, in particular, engaged in the mass killing, deportation, forced labour and mistreatment of prisoners of war and civilians, as well as mass rapes and widespread looting in occupied territories. War crimes were also committed by British, American and other Allied forces, but not on the same scale as those of the Axis powers and the Soviet Union. There has been continued debate over whether the British and American strategic bombing campaigns, in which an estimated 800,000 civilians were killed, were war crimes.

After the war, many trials of Axis war criminals took place – most famously the Nuremberg trials and Tokyo Trials. However, Allied war crimes were not prosecuted by the post-war international military tribunals. The Western Allies prosecuted a number of war crimes committed by their own forces, but these prosecutions probably represented only a small proportion of the crimes the Allies perpetrated.

In the 21st century, historians and other commentators have paid more attention to Allied war crimes, while warning against arguments suggesting a "moral equivalence" between the actions of the Allies and the crimes of the Axis powers.

== Background ==
The militaries of the major Western Allies – the UK, France and United States – were directed to adhere to the Hague Conventions and Geneva Conventions. The Soviet Union had not signed the 1929 Geneva Convention on prisoners of war and did not recognise the Hague Conventions. In August 1945, the Charter of the International Military Tribunal (IMT) defined war crimes as any violation of the customs of war including the deportation, murder or mistreatment of civilians and prisoners of war (POWS) and any plunder or wanton destruction of property or human settlements not justified by military necessity. The IMT charter also defined crimes against humanity to include the extermination, enslavement, deportation, persecution or inhumane treatment of civilians.

== Major Allies ==
War crimes were committed by the Western Allied powers, but not on the same scale as those of the Axis powers and the Soviet Union. The Western Allies prosecuted a number of war crimes committed by their own forces, but Allied war crimes were not prosecuted by the post-war international military tribunals.

Allied soldiers in all theatres sometimes killed enemy soldiers who were attempting to surrender or after they had surrendered. This was particularly common on the Eastern Front and in the Asia-Pacific theatre.

There has been continued debate over whether the area bombing of cities in Germany and Japan and the atomic bombing of Hiroshima and Nagasaki were war crimes. Although there was no international treaty or customary law at the time specifically prohibiting the aerial bombardment of civilians, there were general principles of international law which might have applied. Philosopher Douglas P. Lackey argues that the Hague Conventions, which restricted artillery bombardment of undefended cities, could be applied by analogy to aerial bombardment. A. C. Grayling, however, states that "any competent lawyer could easily defend the area-bombing campaign against imputations of having violated its provisions." Eric Markusen and David Kopf argue that the Allied strategic bombing met the IMT definitions of both war crimes and crimes against humanity. However, the issue was not considered at the Nuremberg and Tokyo war crime trials.

Grayling writes that the unclear legal position means that arguments over the Allied bombing of civilians often concern ethical issues. Critics of area bombing have argued that deliberate attacks on civilian populations are a moral crime, whereas defenders of Allied area bombing often argue that it was a military necessity in a total war where the distinction between the enemy military and civilians aiding the war effort was blurred.

=== Soviet Union ===
The Soviet Union was responsible for imprisoning, deporting and often massacring hundreds of thousands of civilians and POWs from occupied or annexed territories. This included the Katyn massacre of 22,000 Polish officers and intellectuals in 1940 and the Gegenmiao massacre of over 1,000 Japanese women and children in 1945.

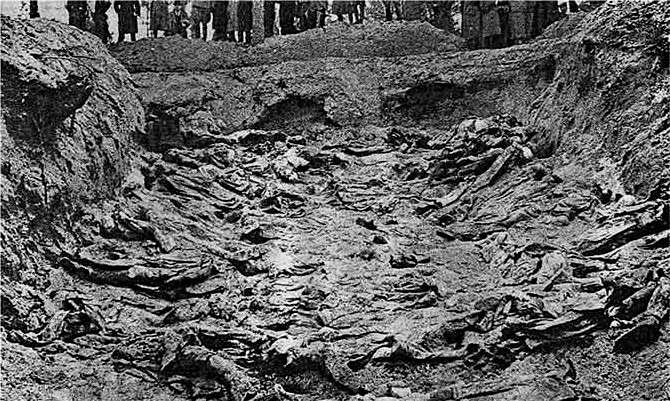
Mass grave of the victims of the Katyn massacre after discovery in 1943

The Soviet Union inflicted high death rates on POWs through executions, starvation, forced labour and other mistreatment. The mistreatment of prisoners was common on the Eastern Front partly because the Soviet Union had not ratified the Geneva Convention on treatment of POWs, and Germany regarded itself as exempt from the convention on that front. Nevertheless, the Nuremberg Tribunal held that the Hague Conventions and other customary laws of war were binding on all belligerents.

About a third of Germans taken prisoner by the Soviet Union died in captivity. In comparison, The mortality rate of German and Japanese prisoners of the Western allies was 1 to 2 per cent. According to Soviet data, 594,000 Japanese soldiers of the Kwantung Army were interned after the Soviet invasion of Manchuria in August 1945. Of these, about 10% died in captivity by 1956. The Japanese government states that about 314,000 Japanese soldiers remain unaccounted for following the Soviet invasion of Manchuria, North Korea, Sakhalin and the Kuril Islands.

The Soviet Union made extensive use of forced labour of foreign civilians and POWs. POWs were interned in the Soviet forced labour camps of the Main Administration for Affairs of Prisoners of War and Internees, a camp system parallel to that of the Gulag, but distinct from it. Many died from malnutrition, the harsh climate and overwork.

Soviet soldiers committed mass rapes in occupied territories, especially Germany. Antony Beevor describes the Soviet rape of German women during the occupation of Germany as the "greatest phenomenon of mass rape in history", and has estimated that 1.4 million women were raped in East Prussia, Pomerania, and Silesia alone. He writes that Soviet women and girls liberated from slave labour in Germany were also violated. Soviet premier Joseph Stalin refused to punish the offenders.

The expulsion of 12 million to 14 million ethnic Germans from Soviet occupied territories is estimated to have caused between 500,000 and 2 million deaths from 1944 to 1946.

=== United Kingdom ===
==== Area bombing of cities ====
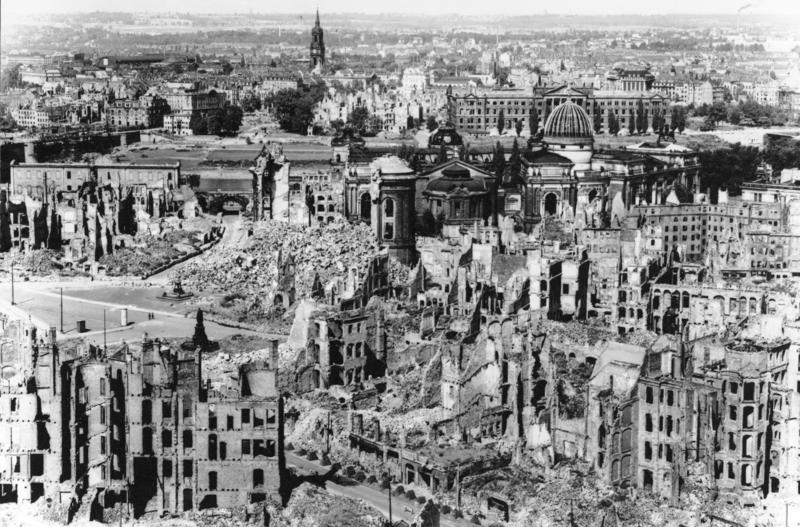
The city centre of Dresden after the bombing

In June 1938, the British prime minister, Neville Chamberlain, stated that the bombing of civilians was contrary to international law. In the early years of the war, Britain's policy was to restrict aerial bombing to military targets. In February 1942, Britain adopted a policy of area bombing aimed at undermining the morale of enemy civilians, which the head of RAF Bomber Command, Arthur Harris, later stated was not contrary to international law. Although Britain's area bombing of German cities, including the bombing of Dresden (which killed about 25,000 people), is sometimes considered a war crime, the legality of aerial bombing of civilian areas was unclear at the time.

==== Unrestricted naval warfare ====
On 8 May 1940, in response to Germany's intensive unrestricted submarine warfare, the British Admiralty announced that all vessels in the Skagerrak were to be sunk on sight. This commenced Britain's unrestricted naval warfare campaign. Sociologist Nachman Ben-Yehuda argues this was contrary to the terms of the Second London Naval Treaty and other relevant international laws at the time.

Alfred de Zayas writes that while it was British policy to rescue shipwreck survivors, German military documents provide credible evidence that the Royal Navy and Royal Air Force sometimes fired on survivors after the sinking of German vessels. In July 1941, the submarine commander Anthony Miers of HMS Torbay twice ordered his crew to kill enemy shipwreck survivors in the Mediterranean. Historian Jürgen Rohwer calls this "the only instance of a war crime committed by a British submarine commander." Miers was reprimanded but later was awarded the Victoria Cross and promoted to admiral.

Britain refused to recognise small hospital ships and often attacked them. They also refused to recognise hospital ships which they believed were used for military purposes in contravention of the Hague Convention. By May 1943, Britain had attacked nine German and 10 Italian hospital ships. On 10 September 1942, the Italian hospital ship Arno was sunk by RAF torpedo bombers off Tobruk. On 1 December, the British sank another Italian hospital ship, the Città di Trapani. The sinkings followed British intercepts of German coded messages showing that the ships were reportedly carrying military supplies, which was in contravention of the Hague Conventions.

On 18 November 1944, the German hospital ship Tübingen was sunk by two Beaufighter bombers off Pola, in the Adriatic Sea. Four crewmembers were killed and 16 wounded. A German military investigation concluded that the sinking was a deliberate violation of international law. A British investigation found that the ship was attacked in error. There was no official order to attack the ship and British policy was not to attack red cross vehicles and vessels.

==== Abuses against enemy military and POWs ====
On the Western Front from June 1944 to May 1945, there were numerous cases of British troops killing enemy POWs, violating and looting the bodies of dead enemy troops, and forcing POWs to undertake military work in contravention of the Geneva Convention. Longden states that the killing of prisoners and enemy soldiers attempting to surrender was not on a large scale. However, it was more common when the British believed the enemy had previously killed British POWs or had fired on British troops after pretending to surrender, and when the British encountered SS troops and guards at liberated concentration camps.

Longden states that the desecration of corpses was uncommon on the Western Front, but did occur. In the Asia-pacific theatre, during the Burma campaign, there are cases of British soldiers removing gold teeth from dead Japanese troops and displaying Japanese skulls as trophies.

German POWs were sometimes forced to undertake tasks on the frontline such as digging trenches, carrying wounded soldiers, and digging graves for dead soldiers. There were also reports of German POWs being forced to clear minefields and fire on German positions. The British classified German military personnel captured after the German surrender as "Surrendered Enemy Personnel" rather than prisoners of war, thus avoiding the protections provided to them under the Geneva Convention.

The "London Cage", a MI19 prisoner of war facility in the UK during and immediately after the war, was subject to allegations of torture. The Bad Nenndorf interrogation centre in occupied Germany, managed by the Combined Services Detailed Interrogation Centre, was the subject of an official inquiry in 1947, which found that there was "mental and physical torture during the interrogations" and that "personal property of the prisoners were stolen".

==== Abuses against civilians ====
On the Western Front in 1944–1945, British troops sometimes killed civilians or destroyed their homes if they had undisclosed weapons in them or showed support for the Nazis.

Italian statistics record eight rapes and nineteen attempted rapes by British soldiers in Italy between September 1943 and December 1945. However, it is likely that this understates the incidence of rape as many victims probably did not report the crime for fear of retribution or dishonouring their family. Although there were numerous reports of British troops sexually assaulting German civilians, they were lower than the British authorities expected. Nevertheless, reports of sexual assaults in Germany and other occupied areas increased in the final months of the war and in the early months of peace.

Looting farms and other civilian properties of food, alcohol, livestock and valuables was common, particularly when British troops reached Germany. The British paid French civilians over £60,000 compensation for looting and theft by October 1944. In May 1945, British and US authorities paid £220,000 compensation for looting in the Nijmegen region of the Netherlands. Over 280,000 claims for compensation were settled by March 1945. The authorities generally tolerated British looting in Germany until fighting ceased in May.

During the Allied occupation of Japan, members of the British Commonwealth Occupation Force (BCOF), which included British, Australian, Indian and New Zealand personnel, were convicted of 80 rapes between May 1946 and September 1951. Official statistics are not available for BCOF's first three months in Japan (February to April 1946). Historian Robin Gerster believes the official statistics undercount the incidence of rape. The penalties given to members of the BCOF convicted of serious crimes included 10 years imprisonment in one murder case and five years imprisonment in one rape case.

=== United States ===
==== Area bombing of cities ====
The American policy of area bombing of cities and towns in Axis and occupied territory is sometimes considered a war crime, particularly in relation to the atomic bombings of Hiroshima and Nagasaki, as well as the bombing of Tokyo and the bombing of Dresden. However, the legality of aerial bombing of civilian areas was unclear at the time.

==== Unrestricted naval warfare ====
On 7 December 1941, following the Japanese attack on Pearl Harbor, the US Navy declared unrestricted submarine warfare against Japan, in contravention of international law.

On 16 September 1942, a US Army Air Force (USAAF) B-24 Liberator bomber was ordered to attack the German submarine U-156 which was rescuing survivors after it had sunk the British troopship Laconia. The submarine displayed a red cross flag and had survivors on its deck and in life rafts it was towing. The bomber attacked the submarine with bombs and depth charges, forcing the submarine to cut the rafts adrift and crash dive. One of the B-24's bombs also landed among the life rafts, overturning them. The following day, the same B-24 attacked another German submarine with survivors on board. According to Sally and Thomas Mallison, the attack on the U-156 was a prima facie war crime.

On 26 January 1943, the American submarine USS Wahoo sank the Japanese transport ship Buyo Maru off New Guinea. The submarine's commander Dudley Morton then ordered his crew to fire on the survivors in the water and on lifeboats, thinking that they were Japanese troops. In fact, the majority of the survivors were British Indian prisoners of war. Out of the 1,126 men on board the Japanese ship, 195 Indian troops and 87 Japanese soldiers died in the sinking and subsequent attack. The attack on the survivors of the sinking breached international law.

During and immediately after the Battle of the Bismarck Sea (2–4 March 1943), U.S. patrol boats and Allied aircraft systematically attacked the survivors of the Japanese warships and troop transport ships sunk or wrecked in the battle. The Allies justified the attacks on the grounds that the survivors were Japanese troops close to their military base and could have quickly returned to the front line.

==== Abuses against enemy military and POWs ====
Illegal orders to take no prisoners were sometimes issued by allied commanders. In July 1943, general Patton gave a speech to officers of the US 45th Division, which some of them considered as orders to shoot enemy prisoners. Following the Malmedy massacre of US POWs by SS troops in December 1944, there were formal and informal orders in some American units not to take SS prisoners and, sometimes, no German prisoners at all. Major-General Raymond Hufft admitted that he gave orders to take no prisoners when his troops crossed the Rhine. There were also a number of recorded instances of American soldiers shooting wounded, captured or surrendering enemy troops during the Normandy campaign, as well as mutilating their bodies.

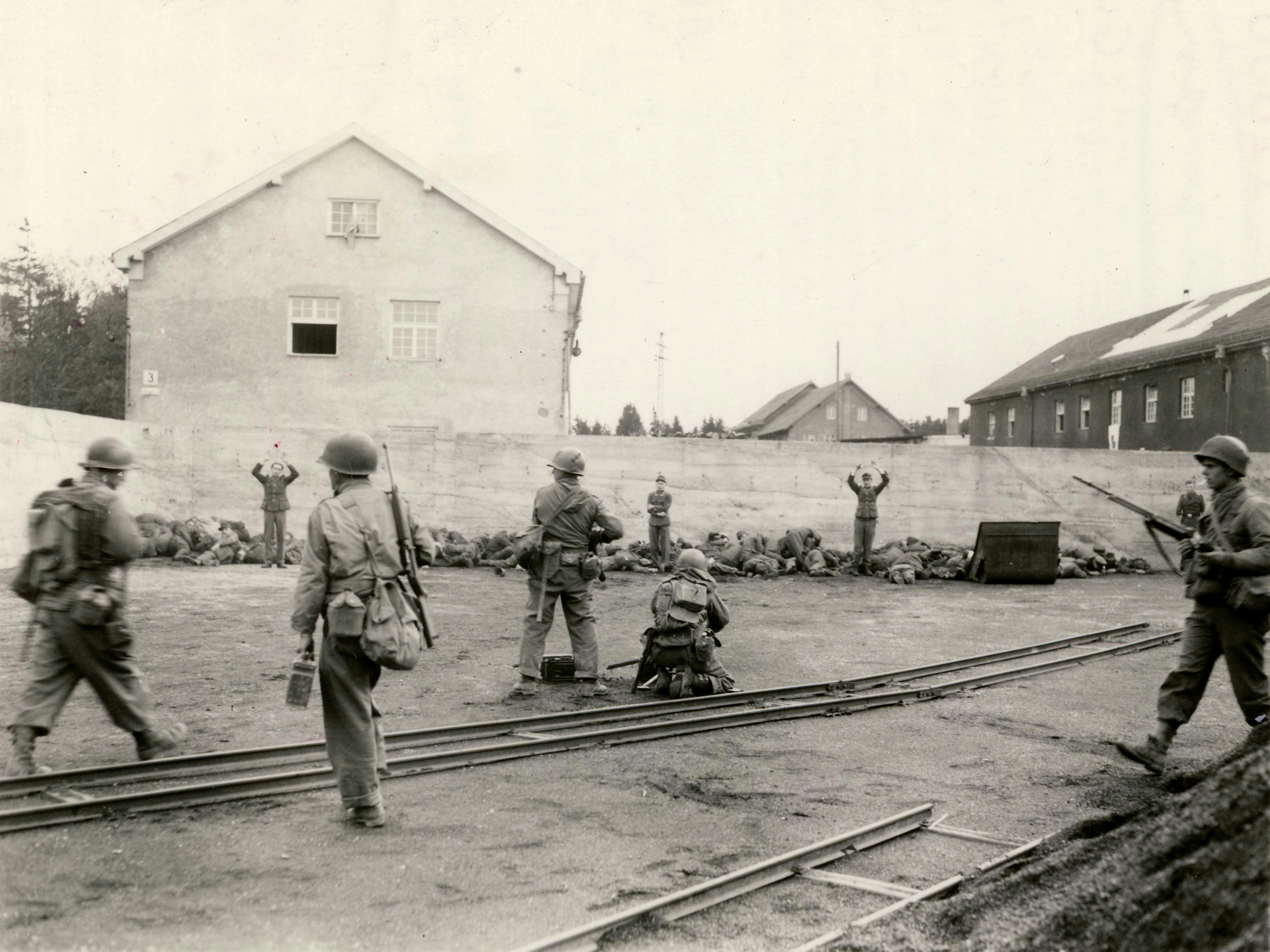
Dachau liberation reprisals. Soldiers of the US Seventh Army and SS prisoners in a coal yard at Dachau concentration camp during its liberation. April 29, 1945 (US Army photograph) (Note: The caption for the photograph in the US National Archives reads, "SC208765, Soldiers of the 42nd Infantry Division, US Seventh Army, order SS men to come forward when one of their number tried to escape from the Dachau, Germany, concentration camp after it was captured by US forces. Men on the ground in background feign death by falling as the guards fired a volley at the fleeing SS men. (157th Regt. 4/29/45)." Lt. Colonel Felix L. Sparks disputed this and thought that it "represented the initial step in the cover-up of the execution of German guards".)

There were a number of incidents where American forces killed surrendering troops and prisoners of war in western Europe. Among the deadliest were the Biscari massacre of 14 July 1943, in which American soldiers killed 73 Italian and German prisoners; the Chenogne massacre, in which 50 to 80 German prisoners were shot; and the massacre of about 39 to 50 German guards following the American liberation of the Dachau concentration camp in April 1945.

In April 1945, during Operation Teardrop, eight survivors of the sunken German submarine U-546 were tortured by US military personnel in order to gain information on supposed V-1 flying bomb or V-2 rocket attacks on the continental United States.

The killing of POWs and enemy soldiers who were attempting to surrender was particularly common in the Asia-Pacific theatre. Historian John W. Dower writes that while it was "not official policy" for Allied personnel to take no POWs, "over wide reaches of the Asian battleground it was everyday practice". Niall Ferguson and others state that this was a reaction to the bitterness of the fighting in this theatre, to reports of the Japanese mistreating Allied soldiers and prisoners of war and faking surrender to launch surprise attacks, to Allied propaganda dehumanising the Japanese, and to the logistical problems of taking prisoners.

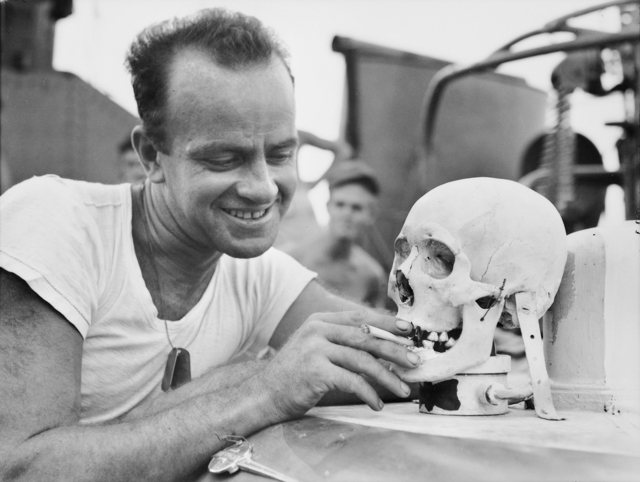
U.S. Navy Lieutenant (j.g.) E. V. McPherson with a Japanese skull on board PT-341

Although some American officers condoned the shooting of surrendering Japanese soldiers, senior officials attempted to stamp it out. Additional leave and other inducements were offered to soldiers who took prisoners, and General Macarthur ordered investigations into alleged shootings of surrendering Japanese. Propaganda leaflets assured the Japanese that if they surrendered they would be treated in accordance with the Geneva Conventions. Ferguson suggests that these efforts probably contributed to the fall in the captured-to-killed ratio of Japanese soldiers from 1:100 in late 1944 to 1:7 by July 1945.

Following the Japanese surrender in August 1945, the treatment of the large number of newly surrendered Japanese military personnel by Western Allied forces often fell below Geneva Convention standards. According to historian S. P. MacKenzie, widespread food shortages, disease, and instances of mistreatment by Allied troops led to the deaths of thousands of already weakened prisoners in the months following the war.

There were also several highly publicised cases of American troops collecting body parts from dead Japanese soldiers as trophies. According to historian James Weingartner, "The percentage of U.S. troops who engaged in the collection of Japanese body parts cannot be ascertained, but it is clear that the practice was not uncommon." In January 1944, the Joint Chiefs of Staff ordered all theatre commanders to suppress the practice, but efforts to enforce the directive were patchy.

==== Abuses against civilians ====
Ninety-five US personnel were executed for war crimes, mostly for rape or murder of civilians. There were also cases where possible war crimes involving the killing of civilians did not lead to prosecutions, such as in the Sicilian town of Canicatti in July 1943, when an American officer and some infantry shot dead six to eight Italian civilians who were looting a soap factory.

There were 904 reported allegations of rape committed by American personnel during the war, resulting in 461 convictions. Criminologist J. Robert Lilly, assuming that only five per cent of rapes were reported, estimates that American servicemen committed 3,640 rapes in France and 11,040 in Germany from 1944 to 1945. Black soldiers were more likely than white soldiers to be charged by military courts with rape, and were usually more severely punished. In the American-occupied zones in Germany and Austria, the number of rapes peaked in mid-1945.

Yuki Tanaka writes that there were "relatively limited" instances of rape of civilians by American forces in the Pacific theatre until the last months of the war. However, there was "a sharp increase" in rapes from the time the Americans invaded Okinawa. George Feifer writes that despite officers warning that the death penalty would be enforced for rape "there were probably thousands of incidents [of rape]" during the battle of Okinawa and immediately after.

There were 76 reported cases of rape or rape and murder in Okinawa in the first five years of occupation, but Tanaka believes most cases went unreported. Historian Peter Schrijvers states that there were 1,336 reported rapes during the first 10 days of the occupation of Kanagawa Prefecture after the Japanese surrender. However, historian Brian Walsh states that this claim originates from a misreading of Japanese Government crime figures that had actually reported 1,326 criminal incidents of all types involving American forces, including an unspecified number of rapes.

The Yokohama police reported 197 cases of American troops committing rape in September 1945, and the metropolitan police reported 165 such cases in Tokyo and Kanagawa prefecture from March 1946 to September 1946. Tanaka considers these figures represent only a small proportion of actual rapes committed by American forces because many went unreported. For the Far East Command as a whole, there were 455 reports of American troops committing rape from 1947 to the end of 1949, resulting in 104 court martials and 53 convictions. Walsh concludes, "there is no credible evidence of mass rape by American soldiers during the Occupation."

=== China ===
China had been fighting a Japanese invasion and undeclared war with Japan since 1937. Following the Japanese attack on Pearl Harbor, China declared war on the Axis on 9 December 1941 and formally joined the Allies on 1 January 1942. The National Revolutionary Army of the Chinese Nationalist government was also involved in intermittent clashes with the armies of the Chinese Communist Party.

Chinese Nationalist and Communist forces were responsible for mass killings of Chinese civilians from 1937 to 1945 which R. J. Rummel calls "democides" and crimes against humanity under the Nuremberg Charter. War crimes were committed in clashes between Chinese Nationalist and Communist forces. In January 1941, fighting erupted between Nationalist forces and the Communist New Fourth Army in which no quarter was given by either side.

However, there is limited information on war crimes against Japanese troops and civilians committed by Chinese forces after China joined the Allies. Although there were some reports of Chinese forces mistreating Japanese prisoners, prisoners generally stated that they were well treated by the Nationalists and Communists.

==== Abuses against enemy military and POWs ====
During the Battle of Hengyang on 7 August, Chief of Staff Sun Mingyun of the Chinese 10th Army ordered that the saline drips be stopped for two Japanese prisoners dying of cholera. Forty-one other Japanese prisoners on hunger strike were also shot.

American members of "Team Elephant" of the Office of Strategic Services (OSS) reported receiving two heads of decapitated Japanese soldiers as a gift from Chinese guerrillas in Hunan in 1945. The OSS reported that torture, along with executions and beheadings were commonly practised by both Chinese guerrillas and Japanese troops in the region.

=== France ===
==== Abuses against enemy military and POWs ====
Following the German invasion of France in 1940, the Wehrmacht War Crimes Bureau investigated reports of French soldiers firing at surrendering German troops and air crew who were shot down in France, and of breaching the Geneva Conventions on the treatment of prisoners of war. However, there were no recorded prosecutions, mostly due to the German policy of establishing "friendly relations" with Vichy France.

During the Italian campaign of 1943-1945, there were reports of Moroccan Goumiers in the French Expeditionary Corps raping and killing prisoners of war, as well as mutilating their bodies.

===== French Forces of the Interior =====
In February 1944 various French Resistance groups were organised into the French Forces of the Interior (FFI) under the leadership of General Marie-Pierre Koenig. On 23 June General Dwight Eisenhower appointed Koenig commander of the FFI with the status of an Allied commander.

Following the Allied landings at Normandy in June 1944 and southern France in August, Resistance groups committed a number of war crimes. On 12 June 1944 one group shot 47 German prisoners and one alleged French collaborator in the Vert woods near Meymac in retaliation for earlier German massacres. On 2 September the FFI killed 80 German prisoners near Annecy after the German government refused the FFI's request to recognise the FFI as a combatant to which the Geneva Conventions applied.On 9 September a Resistance group shot 17 German prisoners near the village of Saint-Julien-de-Crempse in retaliation for an earlier German massacre of 17 French civilians in the same village. Resistance groups also routinely shot prisoners who were SS, Gestapo or security police.

==== Abuses against civilians ====
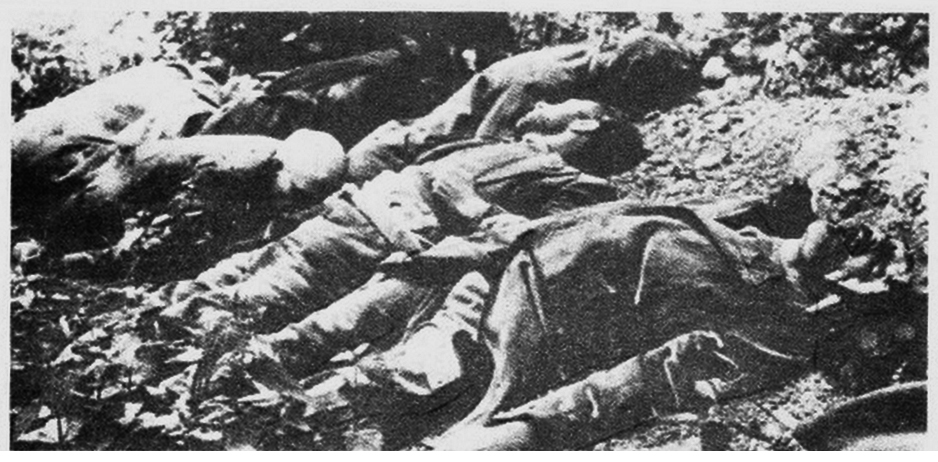
Some civilian victims of the Abbeville massacre, May 1940.

Following the German invasion of France, French troops killed 21 prisoners without trial at Abbeville on 20 May 1940. The prisoners, who were initially detained by Belgian authorities in Bruges, were mainly fascists and nationalists accused of collaboration, as well as communists, foreigners and Jewish refugees. Lieutenant René Caron and Sergeant Emile Mollet were later prosecuted by German authorities over the massacre and sentenced to death by firing squad in 1942.

There were many reports of French troops committing rapes, murders, thefts and other crimes against civilians during the Italian campaign of 1943-1945 and the invasion of Germany in 1944–1945. Most of these crimes were attributed to French colonial troops in African units, particularly the goumiers.

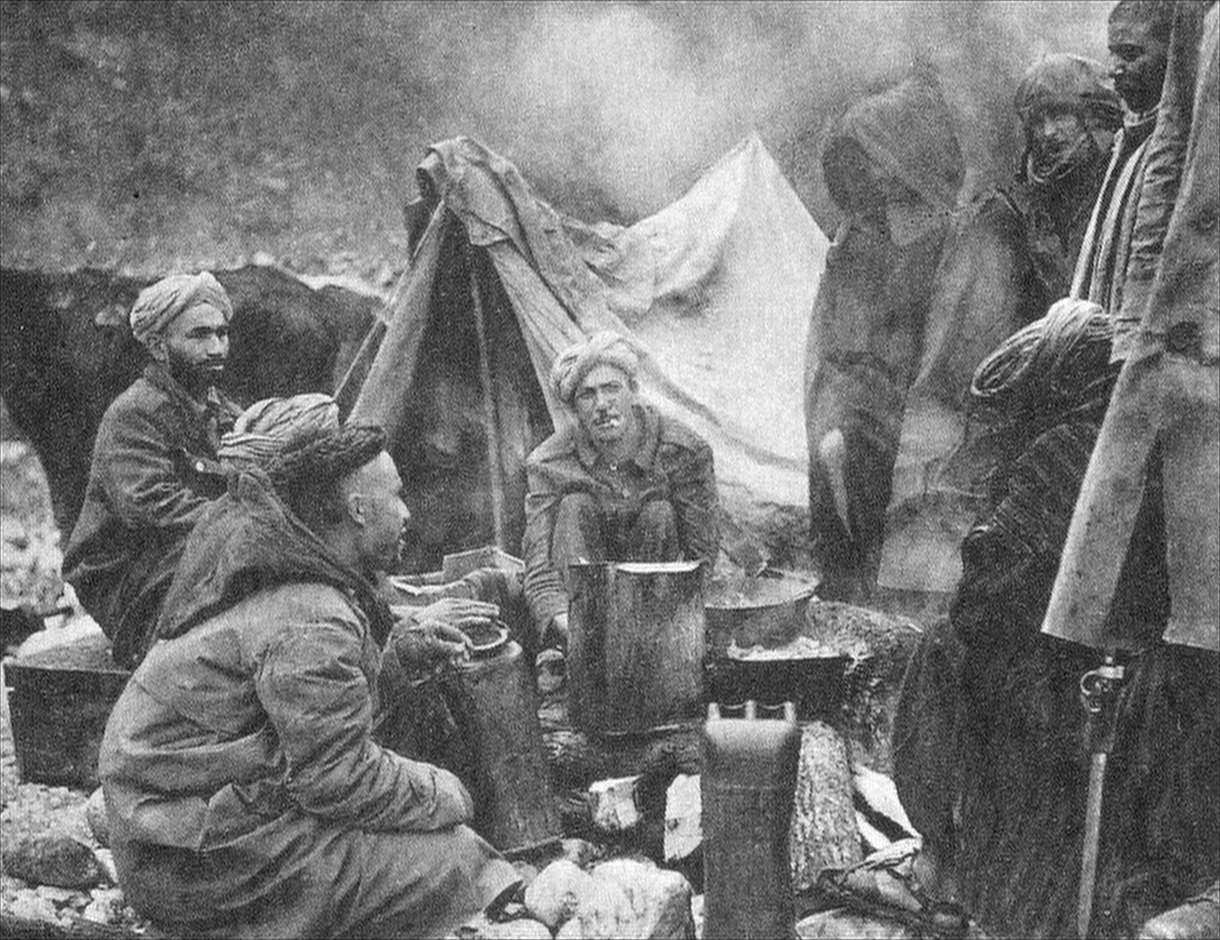
Moroccan Goumiers at Monte Cassino, 1944.

The Italian government recorded 5,000 alleged crimes committed by French colonial troops. Among these were reports of murders and 700 rapes in Frosinone province including 75 rapes in Ceccano in May 1944. Goumiers also committed mass rapes in Sessa Arunca. Complaints from Allied generals led the commander of the French Expeditionary Corps, General Alphonse Juin, to institute a crackdown in which 15 French African soldiers were reportedly executed and 54 imprisoned.

As the Allies advanced into Germany in 1945, there were many reports of French colonial troops sexually assaulting German women. Historian Jill Stephenson states that while these reports might partly reflect local prejudice against African soldiers, the number of such reports in Württemberg lends them credibility. According to historian Perry Biddiscombe, French forces committed 385 rapes in the Constance area, 600 in Bruchsal and 500 in Freudenstadt." The 6th Army group commander, Lieutenant-General Jacob Devers, investigated reports of mass rapes committed by Moroccan troops in April and May 1945, and estimated the number of rapes at under 2,000, some of which he concluded were actually committed by Germans and foreign workers.

== Other Allies ==
=== Australia ===
According to historian Mark Johnston, "the killing of unarmed Japanese was common" and Australian command tried to put pressure on troops to actually take prisoners, but the troops proved reluctant. When prisoners were indeed taken "it often proved difficult to prevent them from killing captured Japanese before they could be interrogated". According to Johnston, as a consequence of this type of behavior, "Some Japanese soldiers were almost certainly deterred from surrendering to Australians".

Major General Paul Cullen indicated that the killing of Japanese prisoners in the Kokoda Track Campaign was not uncommon. In one instance he recalled during the battle at Gorari that "the leading platoon captured five or seven Japanese and moved on to the next battle. The next platoon came along and bayoneted these Japanese."

British, American and Japanese sources often identified Australians as having the worst criminal record among the British Commonwealth Occupation Force in Japan from 1946 to 1952. Gerster argues that Japanese victims of crime sometimes misidentified perpetrators as Australians, and Allied officials sometimes used the Australians as scapegoats for more general ill-discipline among occupational forces. Nevertheless, there are numerous cases of Australian troops being convicted of rape, murder and manslaughter of Japanese civilians. Australian courts often quashed convictions or mitigated the sentences of Australians convicted by courts martial.

=== Canada ===
==== Murder of POWs ====
According to Mitch-am and Avon Hohenstaufen, the Canadian army unit The Loyal Edmonton Regiment murdered German prisoners of war during the invasion of Sicily.

==== Wanton destruction of property ====
On 9 April 1945, after the Lake Superior Regiment cleared it, Canadian engineers destroyed homes in the German village of Sögel in reprisal for civilians joining a skirmish in which five Canadian soldiers were killed. On 14 April, the Canadian Argyll and Sutherland Highlanders demolished homes in the town of Friesoythe after a popular commander was killed in a skirmish with German soldiers. The reprisals, ordered by Major-General Christopher Vokes, were contrary to the Hague Convention.

=== Yugoslavia ===
| Armed conflict | | Perpetrator | |
|---|---|---|---|
| World War II in Yugoslavia | | Yugoslav Partisans | |
| Incident | Type of crime | Persons responsible | Notes |
| Bleiburg repatriations | Alleged war crimes, crimes against humanity: murder of prisoners of war and civilians. | No prosecutions. | The victims were mostly Yugoslav collaborationist troops (ethnic Croats, Serbs, and Slovenes), but also included a number of civilians. They were executed without trial in an act of vengeance for the genocide committed by the pro-Axis collaborationist states (in particular the Ustaše) installed by the Nazis during the German occupation of Yugoslavia. |
| Foibe massacres | War crimes, crimes against humanity: murder of prisoners of war and civilians. Ethnic cleansing. | No prosecutions. | Following Italy's 1943 armistice with the Allied powers up to 1947, OZNA and Yugoslav Partisans executed in Julian March (Karst Region and Istria), Kvarner and Dalmatia a number between 11,000 and 20,000 of the local ethnic Italian population (Istrian Italians and Dalmatian Italians), as well against anti-communists in general (even Croats and Slovenes), usually associated with Fascism, Nazism and collaboration with Axis, as well as against real, potential or presumed opponents of Tito communism. The type of attack was state terrorism, reprisal killings, and ethnic cleansing against Italians. The foibe massacres were followed by the Istrian–Dalmatian exodus. |
| Communist purges in Serbia in 1944–45 | War crimes, crimes against humanity: murder of prisoners of war and civilians. | No prosecutions. | 1944–1945 killings of ethnic Germans (Danube Swabians), Rusyns (Ruthenians) and Hungarians in Bačka, as well as Serb prisoners of war and civilians. |
| Kočevski Rog massacre | War crimes, crimes against humanity: murder of prisoners of war and civilians. | No prosecutions. | Massacres of prisoners of war, and their families. |
| Macelj massacre | Crimes against humanity: murder of prisoners of war and civilians. | No prosecutions. | Massacres of prisoners of war, and their families. |
| Tezno trench | Crimes against humanity: murder of prisoners of war and civilians. | No prosecutions. | Massacres of prisoners of war, and their families. |
| Barbara Pit | Crimes against humanity: murder of prisoners of war and civilians. | No prosecutions. | Massacres of prisoners of war, and their families. |
| Prevalje mass grave | Crimes against humanity: murder of prisoners of war and civilians. | No prosecutions. | Massacres of prisoners of war, and their families. |

== Comparative death rates of POWs ==
According to James D. Morrow, "One measure of adherence to treaty standards is POW death rates because substandard treatment usually results in prisoner deaths." The "democratic states generally provide good treatment of POWs".

After the surrender of Germany, the conditions of recently German personnel apprehended by the Allies significantly worsened; it is estimated that tens of thousands of prisoners died from hunger and disease at that stage. The Allies were not prepared for the large influx of POWs, and conveniently argued that the POW status was not eligible for the military person taken into custody after the surrender, as the German state ceased to exist (the German captives were instead designated Disarmed Enemy Forces or Surrendered Enemy Personnel. Similar argument was made for the Japanese Surrendered Personnel.

=== Killed by the Allied powers ===
- German POWs in East European (not including the Soviet Union) hands 32.9%
- German soldiers held by Soviet Union: 15–33% (14.7% in The Dictators by Richard Overy, 35.8% in Ferguson)
- Italian soldiers held by the Soviet Union: 79%
- Japanese POWs held by Soviet Union: 10%
- German POWs in British hands 0.03%
- German POWs in American hands 0.15%
- German POWs in French hands 2.58%
- Japanese POWs held by U.S.: relatively low, mainly suicides according to James D. Morrow.
- Japanese POWs in Chinese hands: 24%

=== Killed by Axis powers ===
- US and British Commonwealth POWs held by Germany: ≈4%
- Soviet POWs held by Germany: 57.5%
- Italian POWs and military internees held by Germany: between 6% and 8.4% (Note: About 43,600 deaths on a total of approx 730,000 POWs and military internees. Another 13,269 were killed between September 1943 and February 1944 in the sinking of seven ships carrying them from Greece to German-controlled ports. A further 5,000 to 6,000 Italian POW were murdered by the Germans after they had surrendered in the Massacre of the Acqui Division.)
- Western Allied POWs held by Japan: 27% (Figures for Japan may be misleading, as sources indicate that either 10,800 or 19,000 of 35,756 fatalities among Allied POW's were from "friendly fire" at sea when their transport ships were sunk. The Geneva convention required the labelling of hospital ships as such, but had no provision for the labelling of such craft as POW ships. All sides killed many of their own POWs when sinking enemy ships.)

=== Summary table ===
Percent killed
| | | Origin | | | | | |
| | | Soviet Union | United States and United Kingdom | China | Western Allies | Germany | Japan |
|---|---|---|---|---|---|---|---|
| Held by | Soviet Union | – | – | – | – | 14.70 –35.80 | 10.00 |
| Held by | United Kingdom | – | – | – | – | 0.03 | |
| Held by | United States | – | – | – | – | 0.15 | varying |
| Held by | France | – | – | – | – | 2.58 | |
| Held by | East European | – | – | – | – | 32.90 | |
| Held by | Germany | 57.50 | 4.00 | | | – | – |
| Held by | Japan | | included in Western Allies (27) | not documented | 27.00 | – | – |

== Moral equivalence arguments ==
Historians in the 21st century have showed an increasing interest in Allied war crimes. Grayling argues that that this interest is legitimate but should not descend into revisionist arguments that Allied actions were morally equivalent to the Holocaust and other major war crimes committed by Germany and Japan.

A focus on Allied behaviour during the war has long been a theme of Holocaust denial literature. According to historian Deborah Lipstadt, the concept of "comparable Allied wrongs", such as the post-war expulsions of ethnic Germans from Eastern Europe and Allied war crimes, is at the centre of, and a continuously repeated theme of, contemporary Holocaust denial; phenomenon she calls "immoral equivalencies".

Japanese neo-nationalists argue that the Tokyo War Crimes Tribunal represented "victors' justice" and that Allied war crimes were equivalent to those committed by Japanese forces during the war. American historian John W. Dower has written that this position is "a kind of historiographic cancellation of immorality—as if the transgressions of others exonerate one's own crimes".

== See also ==
War crimes committed by the Axis powers and their collaborators

- Genocide of Muslims and Croats in Serbia
- Genocide of Serbs in Croatia
- German war crimes
- Italian war crimes
- Japanese war crimes
- The Holocaust in Bulgaria
- The Holocaust in Croatia
- The Holocaust in France
- The Holocaust in Hungary
- The Holocaust in Norway
- The Holocaust in Romania
- The Holocaust in Slovakia
- The Holocaust in Ukraine
- Ukrainian massacres of Polish civilians

Allied war crimes

- American mutilation of Japanese war dead
- American war crimes
- Bleiburg repatriations
- British war crimes
- Communist purges in Serbia in 1944–1945
- Flight and expulsion of Germans (1944–1950)
- Foibe massacres
- Forced labour of Germans after World War II
- Forced labour of Germans in the Soviet Union
- Poison laboratory of the Soviet secret services, which was involved in experiments on German and Japanese prisoners of war
- Soviet partisan attacks against civilians in Finland
- Soviet war crimes
- Thiaroye massacre

Other

- Crimes against humanity
- Ethnic cleansing
- Genocide
- Genocides in history
- List of ethnic cleansing campaigns
- List of genocides
- List of war crimes
- Looted art
- Philosophy of history
- Taken by Force (book)
- Victor's justice
- World War II casualties
