= Alexander Scotland =

British Army Intelligence Officer (1882–1965)

Lt. Col. Alexander Scotland, OBE
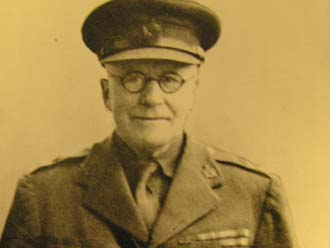
- Born: 15 July 1882; Middlesbrough, Yorkshire, England
- Died: 3 July 1965 (aged 82); Brent, London, England
- Military career
- Allegiance: German South West Africa; United Kingdom
- Branch: German Army; British Army
- Service years: 1903–1907 (German Army, German South West Africa); 1915–1919, 1940–1948 (British Army)
- Rank: Lieutenant Colonel
- Commands: Prisoner of War Interrogation Section
- Conflicts: German campaign in German South West Africa; World War I; World War II
- Awards: Officer of the Order of the British Empire; Bronze Star (USA)

Alexander Paterson Scotland, OBE (1882–1965) was a British Army officer and intelligence officer.

Scotland was noted for his work during and after World War II as commandant of London Cage, an MI19 interrogation facility that was subject to frequent allegations of torture. He wrote about this period in his 1957 book, The London Cage.

== Early life and career ==
Scotland was born in England to Scottish parents from Perthshire. His father was a railway engineer. He came from a family of nine children, three girls and six boys. He left school at the age of fourteen, worked as an office boy at a tea merchant's in Mincing Lane, City of London, and then sailed to Australia before returning to England, where he worked in a London grocery business.

In his 1957 memoir The London Cage, Scotland wrote,

Perhaps because I had a variety of uncles, aunts and other relatives living abroad, my mind was focussed from an early age on the notion of a career overseas, and before I was twenty this compulsive travel urge was again asserting itself.

He travelled to South Africa with the intent of joining the British Army, as his brother was serving there and promised to get him in his unit. However, the Boer War had just ended by the time of his arrival. He then worked for an insurance company before returning to the grocery and provisions trade. He lived in the town of Ramansdrift, at the border between South Africa and German South West Africa. German forces became his chief customers, and he learned to speak German fluently.

At the invitation of a German officer, Scotland joined the German Army as Schottland (lit. 'Scotland'). In The London Cage he says he took part in "several battles" with the Khoikhoi, then engaged in an uprising against German rulers of South West Africa. He served in the German Army from 1903 to 1907.

Upon return to Cape Town, Scotland was appointed General Manager of the government trading post at Ramansdrift by Leander Starr Jameson, Prime Minister of the Cape Colony. The appointment made Scotland influential with British, German and Khoikhoi forces, and he became involved in cease-fire talks with the Khoikhoi leader Johannes Christian. Scotland was awarded the Order of the Red Eagle for his services.

During that time, Scotland began unofficially reporting German manpower and other information to British intelligence in Cape Town "and to General Smuts' agents on their periodic visits to me in my bushland commercial headquarters."

Over time, the Germans became suspicious of him, but no action was taken and he continued his work for both sides until 1914, when he was imprisoned by the Germans on suspicion of espionage. He was interned in the prison at Windhoek until 6 July 1915, when the area was captured by British Empire troops from the Union of South Africa. He returned to England upon his release. Following his return he launched an unsuccessful court case in the King's Bench Division of the High Court of Justice, attempting to recover the salary that had been withheld by his employer, South African Territories (Limited), whilst he was interned.

== World War I ==
In 1915, Scotland sought to enter work within British military intelligence. Initially rebuffed, he was then accepted into the Inns of Court Officer Training Corps. He was posted to France and received a commission as second lieutenant in July 1916. In France he was assigned to interrogate German prisoners.

In The London Cage, Scotland says that he used his fluent German and knowledge of the German Army to cajole information from German prisoners. To determine the manpower needs of the German army, for instance, he ordered German noncommissioned officers at a prisoner of war cage to survey their men's health status and age. The purpose was to determine whether the German Army was being forced to return ill soldiers to duty, or to use young and inexperienced soldiers, because of manpower shortages.

In the spring of 1918, Scotland made three secret trips behind German lines in Beverlo, a town in Flanders where porous security allowed transit into German-occupied Belgium. Scotland posed as an overseas German from German South West Africa. On the recommendation of a German he knew in South Africa, he found employment as a civilian worker for the German Army, and gathered intelligence by chatting with German soldiers. Scotland fled home to the United Kingdom when he came under suspicion from a German noncommissioned officer.

Scotland left military service in 1919 with the rank of captain, which he describes in The London Cage as the highest rank in the Intelligence Corps. He was appointed Officer of the Order of the British Empire (OBE) on 1 January 1919, in a group of honours awarded "for valuable services rendered in connection with military operations in France and Flanders".

== World War II and the 'cages' ==
After the First World War, Scotland returned to South West Africa and then obtained what he describes in The London Cage as a "roving job with a famous commercial enterprise." This brought him to South America, where he worked between 1927 and 1933. While in South America, Scotland says he made "discreet inquiries" about the large German communities in those countries. Scotland returned to England in 1933, and made several trips to Germany in the ensuing years. During one of his trips to Germany in 1937, Scotland says, he met with Adolf Hitler at a friend's house in Munich, and discussed South West Africa.

In early 1940, Scotland was recalled to duty. He says in The London Cage that he was commissioned a major and was posted to France in March, but official records say he was commissioned as a second lieutenant in April. He was assigned to the British Expeditionary Force in France, where he was assigned to organize prisoner of war interrogation centers, and to instruct officers on treatment and interrogation of prisoners. He found British forces ill-equipped to deal with war prisoners, with the staff assigned to such duties consisting of writers and journalists, some with background in security work but none with training or knowledge of military intelligence. Scotland returned to England in the Dunkirk evacuation a month later, and in July 1940, he was transferred to the Intelligence Corps.

Upon his return to England, Scotland was put in charge of the Prisoner of War Interrogation Section (PWIS). A "cage" for interrogation of prisoners was established in each command area, manned by officers trained by Scotland. The prisoners were sent to prison camps after their interrogation at the cages. Nine cages were established from southern England to Scotland, with the London cage also being "an important transit camp." The cages varied in facilities. The Doncaster cage used a portion of the town's racecourse as a camp, while the Catterick and Loughborough cages were in bare fields.

The London Cage, located in Kensington, a fashionable part of the city, had space for 60 prisoners, was equipped with five interrogation rooms, and staffed by ten officers serving under Scotland, plus a dozen noncommissioned officers who served as interrogators and interpreters. Security was provided by soldiers from the Guards regiments selected "for their height rather than their brains". Scotland does not describe in detail the wartime functions of any of the cages, including the eponymous London cage, in his The London Cage memoir.

== War crimes investigations ==
After the war, the PWIS became known as the War Crimes Investigation Unit (WCIU), and the London Cage became the headquarters for questioning suspected war criminals. Among the Nazi war criminals confined at the London cage was Fritz Knöchlein, who was charged with the murder of 97 British prisoners who had surrendered at Le Paradis, France in May 1940 after protecting the evacuation from Dunkirk. Knöchlein was convicted and hanged in 1949.

In The London Cage Scotland spoke disparagingly of the varying treatment of Nazi war criminals, and the necessity of prompt prosecutions. Scotland participated in the interrogation of General Kurt Meyer, who was accused of participating in a massacre of Canadian troops. Meyer was eventually sentenced to death, although the sentence was not carried out. Scotland observed that Meyer received milder treatment after news of the atrocity had grown "cold". He said that a Nazi Gauleiter, Jakob Sporrenberg, who was responsible for the deaths of 46,000 Jews in Poland toward the end of the war, was not prosecuted by Poland despite documentary evidence of his crimes, because of Polish dislike of Jews. However Sporrenberg would eventually be convicted and executed in Poland in 1952.

Other Nazi war criminals passing through the London Cage after the war included Sepp Dietrich, an SS general accused but never prosecuted for the murder of British prisoners in 1940. Scotland participated in the investigation of the SS and Gestapo men who murdered 41 escaped prisoners from Stalag Luft III in 1944, in the aftermath of what became known as the "Great Escape". The London Cage closed in 1948.

On 14 February 1946, he was awarded the US Bronze Star for his prisoner interrogation work, and enhancing US/UK cooperation. He was formally granted permission to wear this foreign decoration on 25 September 1947 by King George VI.

== Torture allegations ==
Scotland was accused by a number of prisoners of the London Cage of extracting confessions by torture. Prior to publication of The London Cage, MI5 pointed out that Scotland had detailed repeated breaches of the Geneva convention, and had admitted "that prisoners had been forced to kneel while being beaten about the head; forced to stand to attention for up to 26 hours; threatened with execution; or threatened with 'an unnecessary operation'." Publication of the book was delayed for years, and these details were excised.

== Later years ==
Scotland's efforts to obtain publication of The London Cage were opposed by British intelligence officials, on the grounds of the Official Secrets Act 1911. In 1955, Special Branch detectives searched his home and seized all three copies of the manuscript, as well as Scotland's notes and records, some of which were official files he had retained at the end of the war. Scotland responded by threatening to publish the book in the United States. The New York Times reported that the British government was "unwilling to have the bugbear of German atrocities revived at this time, when official policy is to support the Bonn government and the ratification of the Paris agreements to arm West Germany."

An expurgated version of the book was published in Britain in 1957, with the disclaimer:

The War Office wishes to make it clear that the views and facts stated in this book are the Author's own responsibility. Further, the War Office does not in any way vouch for the accuracy of the facts and does not necessarily accept any opinions expressed in this book.

In 1957, Scotland was technical advisor to the movie The Two-Headed Spy, starring Jack Hawkins as a British intelligence agent named Scotland who poses as a general of the German Wehrmacht named Schottland.

Scotland does not mention the movie in The London Cage but says that false stories of his serving on the Nazi general staff circulated in the British press after his testimony at the 1947 trial in Italy of Field Marshal Albert Kesselring. He had testified at the trial that he had served in the German army early in the century. Scotland said in The London Cage that he planned to call a press conference to deny the allegations, but was told by Whitehall "'Say nothing. Let the story rip.' I have never discovered the official reason for this intriguing ban."

Scotland died on 3 July 1965 at the Twyford Abbey nursing home in Brent, north London, aged 82.

== Selected publications ==
- Scotland, Alexander Paterson (1957). The London Cage. London: Evan Brothers. OCLC 223431209.
- Scotland, Alexander Paterson (1959). The London Cage. London: Landsborough. OCLC 855386546.
