= The Two-Headed Spy =

1958 film by André de Toth

- Theatrical poster
- Directed by: Andre de Toth
- Written by: J. Alvin Kugelmass; Michael Wilson (originally credited as "James O'Donnell"); Alfred Levitt (uncredited)
- Produced by: Bill Kirby
- Starring: Jack Hawkins; Gia Scala; Erik Schumann; Alexander Knox
- Cinematography: Ted Scaife
- Edited by: Raymond Poulton
- Music by: Gerard Schurmann
- Distributed by: Columbia Pictures
- Release dates: 17 November 1958 (UK); 2 March 1959 (US)
- Running time: 93 minutes
- Country: United Kingdom
- Language: English

The Two-Headed Spy is a 1958 British spy thriller film directed by Andre de Toth and starring Jack Hawkins, Gia Scala, Erik Schumann, Donald Pleasence and Alexander Knox. The film, which has elements of film noir and is set in the Second World War, was based on a story by J. Alvin Kugelmass called Britain's Two-Headed Spy and is notable for having been scripted by blacklisted writers.

== Plot ==
In 1939, Alex Schottland, a colonel in charge of supplies in the German Army, is a long-entrenched British agent planted toward the end of the First World War. He is growing weary of being a spy, but is urged to continue by his friend and fellow British agent, Cornaz, who is posing as an antique dealer.

In 1941 Schottland passes on information that Germany is about to invade the Soviet Union. Captain Reinisch, a Gestapo agent and Schottland's suspicious aide, discovers that Schottland has changed his original name and is of British ancestry. However, his superiors already know about Schottland's past and scoff at the possibility that he is a spy. To deflect suspicion and boost his own credibility as a loyal Nazi, Schottland claims at a staff meeting that "defeatists" inside the German high command have leaked military information to the enemy.

Cornaz is arrested after their courier to the British is intercepted. Schottland, as a customer at the antique shop, is summoned to headquarters for questioning, and is forced to watch as Gestapo officer Müller tortures Cornaz. The brutal torture kills Cornaz before Müller can get any evidence to incriminate Schottland. Though he is arrested, the General is soon released on the intervention of a high-ranking Nazi, Ernst Kaltenbrunner, who had been convinced of his sincerity when Schottland seemingly damaged his own position with his accusation of defeatism among the General Staff.

Cornaz's replacement as a relayer of military information to the British is the attractive singer Lili Geyr. Though drawn to each other, they agree not to get involved emotionally, but Schottland pretends to be having an affair with her while actually passing on information. The pretence further antagonizes Reinisch, who is in love with Geyr himself.

Schottland wishes to pass on news of the attempt to break through Allied lines in the Battle of the Bulge, but Geyr no longer has means of communicating the information to the British. When Schottland is ordered to the front, he drives off the main road and tries to contact the Allies via a radio transmitter, but is forced to shoot a corporal who interrupts him. Schottland returns to Berlin and, now unable to transmit vital news, decides to sabotage the German war effort by tricking Hitler into making strategic military blunders. He does this successfully by catering to Hitler's vanity and deluded sense of the realities of the military situation.

With the war nearing its end, Schottland sends Geyr to cross over to the Allies. The plan is that once safely behind the lines she is to stay there, and after the war she and Schottland will re-unite at a pub named The Fiddlers Three in London and live together, at last acknowledging the strength of their relationship. Geyr is intercepted by Reinisch, who follows and shoots her, in the process getting his hands on incontrovertible evidence of Schottland's involvement in giving away German military secrets. Reinisch does not immediately act on what he has learned, however. His attempt to contact his superiors in the Gestapo fails because the communication network is in chaos. When he finally confronts Schottland the next morning at Schottland's home, they fight, struggle for a dropped gun, and Schottland kills Reinisch. He then requests an immediate meeting with Hitler, where he implicates capable German generals as defeatists so that they will be relieved of their duties, and also casts suspicion on Müller, who as a result is also arrested.

Having volunteered to contact a missing general to assist in the defence of Berlin, Schottland is driven along an autobahn. Orders are received to pursue him, but he cuts across the forest towards the Allied lines. Camouflaged troops capture him, and on realising they are British his face breaks into a relieved smile.

The war ends with Germany surrendering, and now in London, Schottland is saluted while entering The Fiddlers Three.

== Cast ==
- Jack Hawkins as General Alex Schottland
- Gia Scala as Lili Geyr
- Erik Schumann as Captain Kurt Reinisch
- Alexander Knox as Gestapo Leader Müller
- Felix Aylmer as Cornaz
- Walter Hudd as Admiral Canaris
- Edward Underdown as Ernst Kaltenbrunner
- Laurence Naismith as General Hauser
- Geoffrey Bayldon as Dietz
- Kenneth Griffith as Adolf Hitler
- Michael Caine as Gestapo Agent
- Martin Benson as General Wagner
- Ronald Hines as German Corporal
- Donald Pleasence as General Hardt
- Martin Boddey as General Optiz
- Victor Woolf as Secondhand Shop Owner

== Production ==
Lt. Col. Alexander Scotland OBE served as technical advisor to the film. Although the film was ostensibly based on a true story, and Scotland was known as "Schottland" during his service with German forces in Africa at the turn of the century, the film was not based on Scotland's experiences. He served during World War II as commandant of the "London Cage", an MI19 facility that interrogated captured Germans.

Filming took place in 1958 on location in London and Berlin and in Elstree Studios in Borehamwood.

Michael Caine appears in a bit-part as a Gestapo officer, and Donald Pleasence plays a German general. Screenwriters Michael Wilson and Alfred Levitt were not given credit because of the blacklist. The credit instead was given to James O'Donnell. Their credits were restored in 1999. Dalton Trumbo, also blacklisted, was a story consultant.
