= Embassy of the Czech Republic, London =

Embassy of the Czech Republic in London
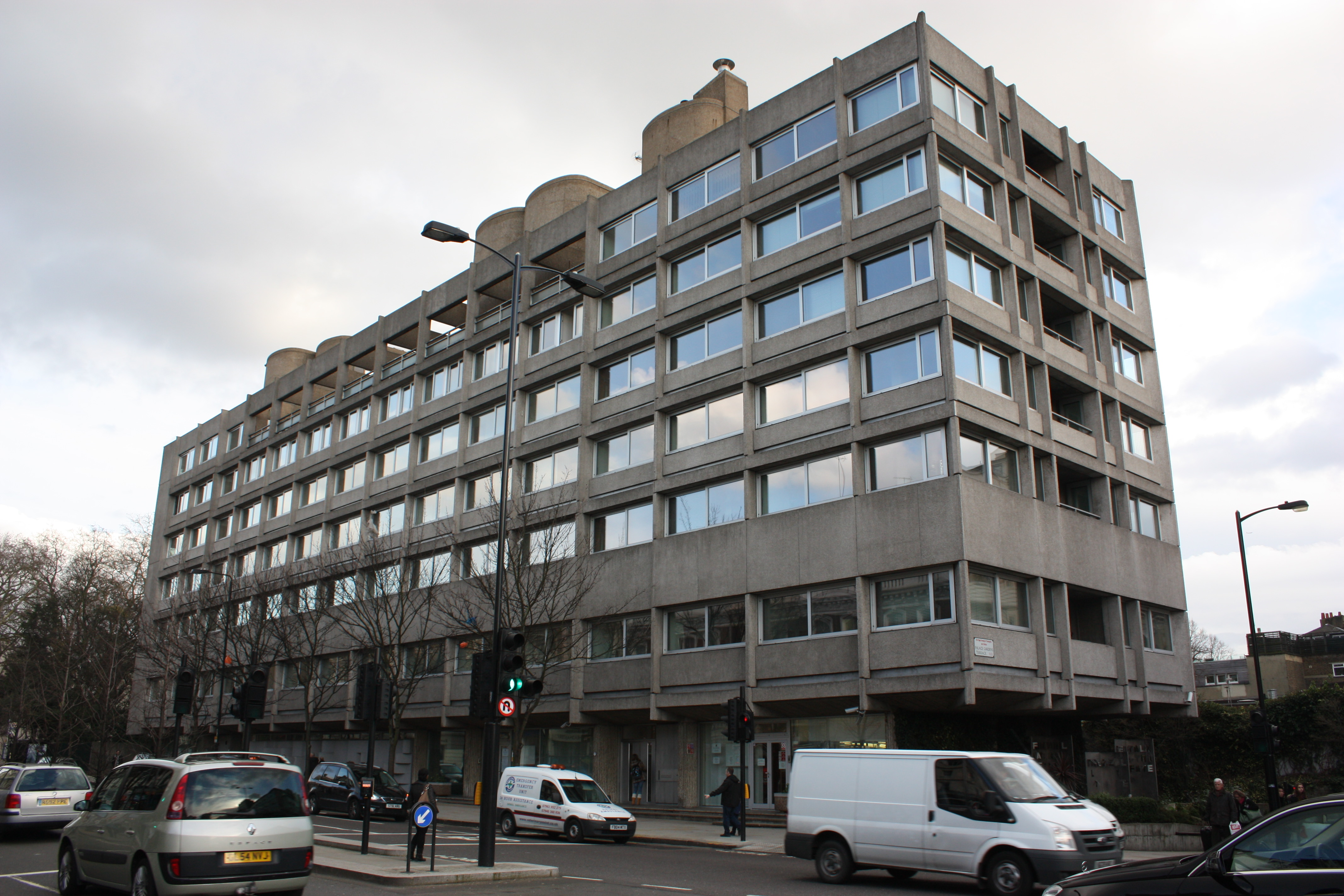
- Location: Notting Hill Gate, London
- Address: 26–30 Kensington Palace Gardens, London, W8 4QY
- Coordinates: 51°30′33.8″N 0°11′36.4″W
- Ambassador: Václav Bartuška

The Embassy of the Czech Republic in London is the diplomatic mission of the Czech Republic in the United Kingdom. It is located at the junction of Kensington Palace Gardens and Bayswater Road in a building it shares with the Embassy of Slovakia. The current ambassador is Václav Bartuška.

The Embassy of Czechoslovakia was originally located on Grosvenor Place, before moving to the location of the current Czech and Slovak embassies in 1970. The construction of a new brutalist-style building at this site had begun in 1965 and was undertaken by Jan Bočan, Jan Šrámek and Karel Štěpánský from the atelier Beta Prague Project Institute; it received an award from the Royal Institute of British Architects for the best building in the United Kingdom created by foreign architects. The building was then divided between the Czech Republic and Slovakia following the dissolution of Czechoslovakia in 1993.

== Gallery ==
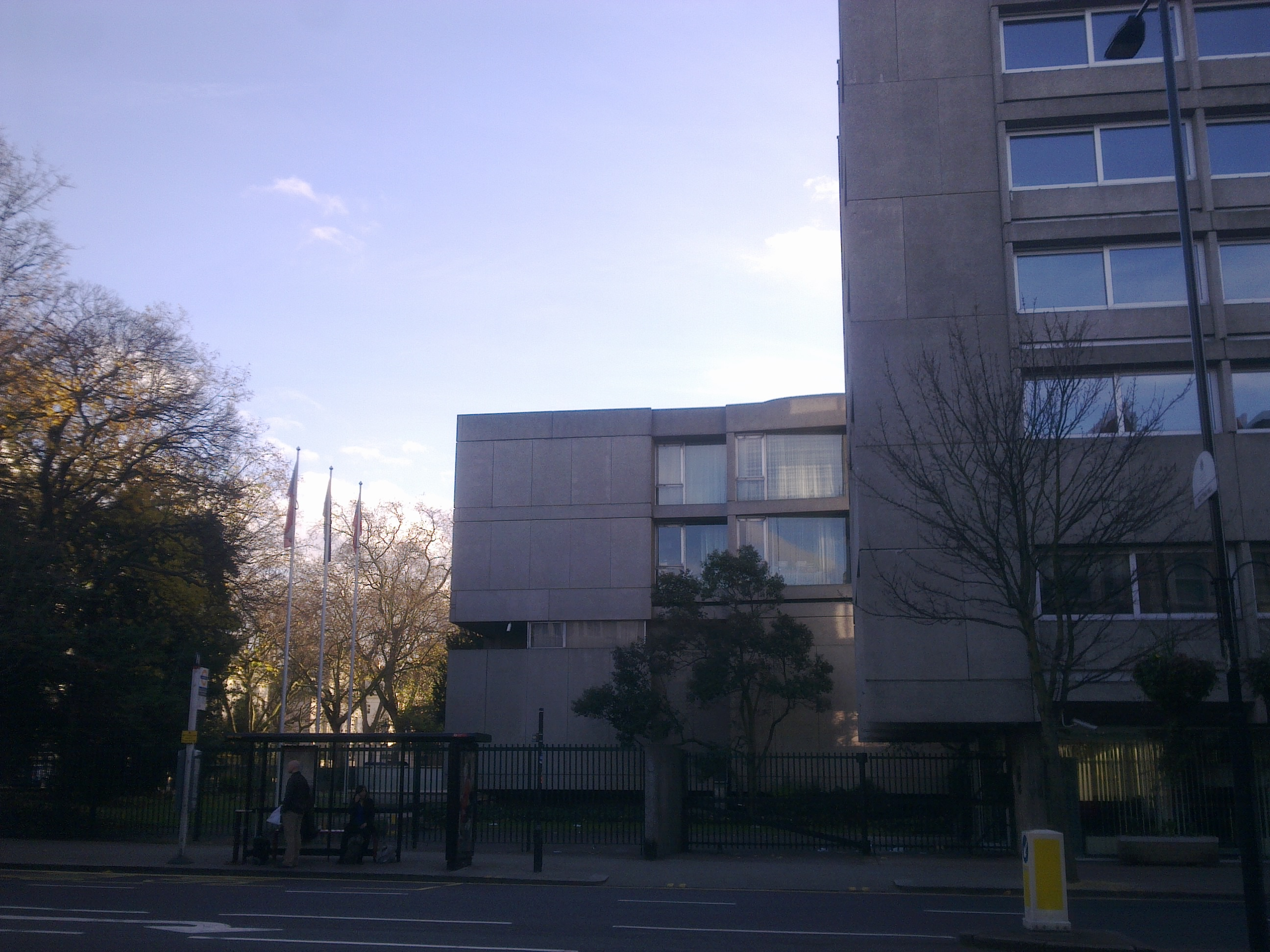
The embassy
