= Jakob Sporrenberg =

German SS general and war criminal (1902–1952)

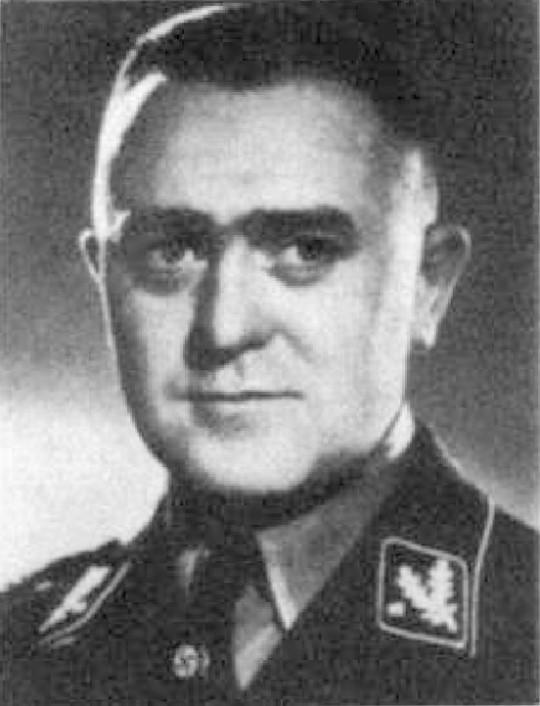
- Sporrenberg, (c. 1938)

Personal details
- Born: 16 September 1902 Düsseldorf, Kingdom of Prussia, German Empire
- Died: 6 December 1952 (aged 50) Mokotow Prison, Warsaw, Polish People's Republic
- Cause of death: Execution by hanging
- Party: Nazi Party
- Other political affiliations: Deutschvölkischer Schutz- und Trutzbund
- Known for: Operation Harvest Festival
- Civilian awards: Golden Party Badge

Military service
- Allegiance: Weimar Republic; Nazi Germany
- Branch/service: Freikorps; German Army; Waffen-SS
- Years of service: 1919–1921; 1936; 1940–1945
- Rank: Leutnant der reserves SS-Gruppenführer and Generalleutnant of Police
- Commands: Higher SS and Police Leader, Nordöst, Rhein; SS and Police Leader, Minsk, Lublin, Süd-Norwegen
- Military awards: Iron Cross, 1st and 2nd class

Jakob Sporrenberg (16 September 1902 – 6 December 1952) was a German Nazi Party politician and member of the SS. He rose to the rank of SS-Gruppenführer und Generalleutnant der Polizei and held several major commands. During the Second World War, he was the SS and Police Leader (SSPF) in Minsk and in Lublin. He was responsible for overseeing and implementing Operation Harvest Festival, which resulted in the deaths of an estimated 40,000 to 43,000 Jews. After the war, Sporrenberg stood trial in Poland, was convicted in 1950 of war crimes and sentenced to death. He was executed in December 1952.

== Early life ==
Jakob Sporrenberg was born in Düsseldorf, the son of a gardener, and attended the local Volksschule and vocational school from 1908 to 1919. From April 1916 to November 1918, he was also apprenticed as a mechanic at the Opel automotive company in Düsseldorf. Between 1919 and 1921, he served as a volunteer in a Freikorps rifle brigade with the Grenzschutz Ost. In 1920, he was a participant in the Kapp Putsch that sought to overthrow the newly-formed Weimar Republic.

Sporrenberg began to be politically active in 1921, joining the Deutschvölkischer Schutz- und Trutzbund, at the time the largest and most active antisemitic political organization in Germany. He next joined the Nazi Party and its paramilitary unit, the Sturmabteilung (SA), from 1922 until they were banned in the wake of the failed Beer Hall Putsch in November 1923. He became active in opposing the French occupation of the Ruhr and was arrested by the French authorities in December 1923 for acts of sabotage. In May 1924, Sporrenberg was sentenced by a French court-martial to two years in prison and a fine of 1,000 gold Marks but was released in August 1925. He was an employee of the construction office of the Düsseldorf Telegraph Company from May 1921 to August 1929, and was then unemployed.

== Nazi Party peacetime career ==
In August 1925, Sporrenberg rejoined the SA and again became a Nazi Party member (membership number 25,585) in December. As an early Party member, he later would be awarded the Golden Party Badge. He was a co-founder of the SA unit in Düsseldorf and served in the leadership of the Hitler Youth in that city. He served as an SA-Truppführer, a senior non-commissioned officer, in SA-Standarte 39 in Düsseldorf from 1925 until 1 October 1930 when he joined the Schutzstaffel (SS number 3,809). He was commissioned as an SS-Sturmführer on 15 December 1930 and led SS-Sturm (platoon) 54 in Düsseldorf until 27 November 1931. Promoted to SS-Sturmbannführer, he commanded a Sturmbann (battalion) in SS-Standarte 20 in Düsseldorf until 4 July 1932, then advanced to the command of the entire SS-Standarte. In November 1932, he became a full-time SS leader and was promoted to SS-Standartenführer.

Following the Nazi seizure of power, Sporrenberg was named the Führer of SS-Abschnitt (district) XX in Kiel on 20 July 1933, where he served until 20 September 1936. During this posting, he was promoted to SS-Oberführer (9 November 1933) and SS-Brigadeführer (30 January 1936). During his time in Kiel, he sat as a Prussian Provincial Councilor for the Province of Schleswig-Holstein from 30 January 1935 to 20 September 1936. On 1 March 1936, Sporrenberg entered military service with the German Army as a Leutnant of reserves with Infantry Regiment 26 in Flensburg. Leaving Kiel on 20 September 1936, he was made the commander of SD-Oberabschnitt (main district) Nordöst in East Prussia, with headquarters in Königsberg. On 1 September 1938, he also was named Inspector of the Sicherheitspolizei and the SD for Wehrkreis (military district) I in Königsberg, holding these posts until 25 September 1939.

Apart from his SS duties, Sporrenberg was also politically active, and was elected as a deputy to the Reichstag in March 1933 from electoral constituency 22 (Düsseldorf-East), switching to constituency 13 (Schleswig-Holstein) at the 1936 election and constituency 1 (East Prussia) at the 1938 election. He would retain his Reichstag seat until the fall of the Nazi regime.

== Second World War ==
Sporrenberg was transferred to the command of SS-Oberabschnitt Rhein in Wiesbaden on 25 September 1939 and, on 1 October, concurrently was named the Higher SS and Police Leader (HSSPF) Rhein. With this appointment came a seat on the Defense Committee of Wehrkreis XII. On 30 January 1940, he was promoted to the rank of SS-Gruppenführer and, in June 1940, he became a member of the Waffen-SS. He returned to Königsberg in that month as commander of SS-Oberabschnitt Nordöst and the HSSPF Nordöst, remaining in that assignment until 1 May 1941. He also sat on the Defense Committee for Wehrkreis I and was the representative of the Reich Commissioner for the Consolidation of German Nationhood for that military district. He then underwent training in the main office of the Ordnungspolizei and at the Reich Security Main Office (RSHA) through June.

From 21 July to 14 August 1941, he was SS and Police Leader (SSPF) in the Generalbezirk Weißruthenien, headquartered in Minsk. He then served on the staff of Reichskommissar Erich Koch in the Reichskommissariat Ukraine. In March 1943, he was assigned to the staff of SS-Obergruppenführer Erich von dem Bach-Zelewski to combat partisans in the Bandenbekämpfung operations. Sporrenberg was made a Generalleutnant of police on 7 July 1943 and succeeded Odilo Globočnik as SSPF of Lublin in the General Government of occupied Poland from 16 August 1943 to 25 November 1944. In this capacity, Sporrenberg oversaw and implemented the mass shooting of Jewish forced laborers during Operation Harvest Festival on 3–4 November 1943 that resulted in the murder of an estimated 40,000 to 43,000 individuals. In November 1944, Sporrenberg and several of his staff were redeployed to Norway. There Sporrenberg served as SSPF of the newly established command of Süd-Norwegen (South Norway). He was the only holder of this post and remained there until Germany's surrender.

== Post-war ==
At the end of the war in Europe in May 1945, Sporrenberg and his staff were captured by British forces. Their interrogation shed much light on Globočnik's activities in Lublin. One outcome of his interrogation was the transfer of Sporrenberg from the PWIS Detachment (Norway) in Oslo to the MI19 interrogation centre in Kensington Palace Gardens, London, known as the "London Cage"; for further questioning by the War Crimes Interrogation Unit. This established his participation in a number of war crimes committed in Poland and the Soviet Union. Sporrenberg was extradited to the Polish People's Republic in October 1946, and sentenced to death for war crimes by a Polish court in Warsaw in 1950. He was hanged on 6 December 1952.

== Alleged source for the wonder weapon hoax ==
Sporrenberg is the supposed source for Prawda o Wunderwaffe (The Truth About the Wunderwaffe), a book about the alleged German occult secret weapon Die Glocke (The Bell) written in 2000 by Polish writer Igor Witkowski, who claimed to have gained access to transcripts of an interrogation of Sporrenberg by Polish authorities through an unnamed contact in the Polish intelligence service. The book is widely considered a hoax.

== See also ==
- List SS-Gruppenführer

== Sources ==
- Information about Jakob Sporrenberg in the Reichstag database
- Klee, Ernst (2007). Das Personenlexikon zum Dritten Reich. Wer war was vor und nach 1945. Frankfurt-am-Main: Fischer-Taschenbuch-Verlag. ISBN 978-3-596-16048-8.
- Poprzeczny, Joseph (2004). Odilo Globocnik, Hitler's Man in the East. McFarland. ISBN 978-0-786-41625-7.
- Schiffer Publishing Ltd., ed. (2000). SS Officers List: SS-Standartenführer to SS-Oberstgruppenführer (As of 30 January 1942). Schiffer Military History Publishing. ISBN 0-7643-1061-5.
- Sporrenberg, Jakob (1902-1952) in the Die Rheinland-Pfälzische Personendatenbank
- Stockhorst, Erich (1985). 5000 Köpfe: Wer War Was im 3. Reich. Arndt. ISBN 978-3-887-41116-9.
- Witkowski, Igor (2013). The Truth About The Wunderwaffe. RVP Press. ISBN 978-1-618-61338-7.
- Yerger, Mark C. (1997). The Allgemeine-SS: The Commands, Units and Leaders of the General SS. Schiffer Publishing Ltd. ISBN 0-7643-0145-4.
