= Embassy of Nepal, London =

- नेपाली राजदूतावास, लण्डन
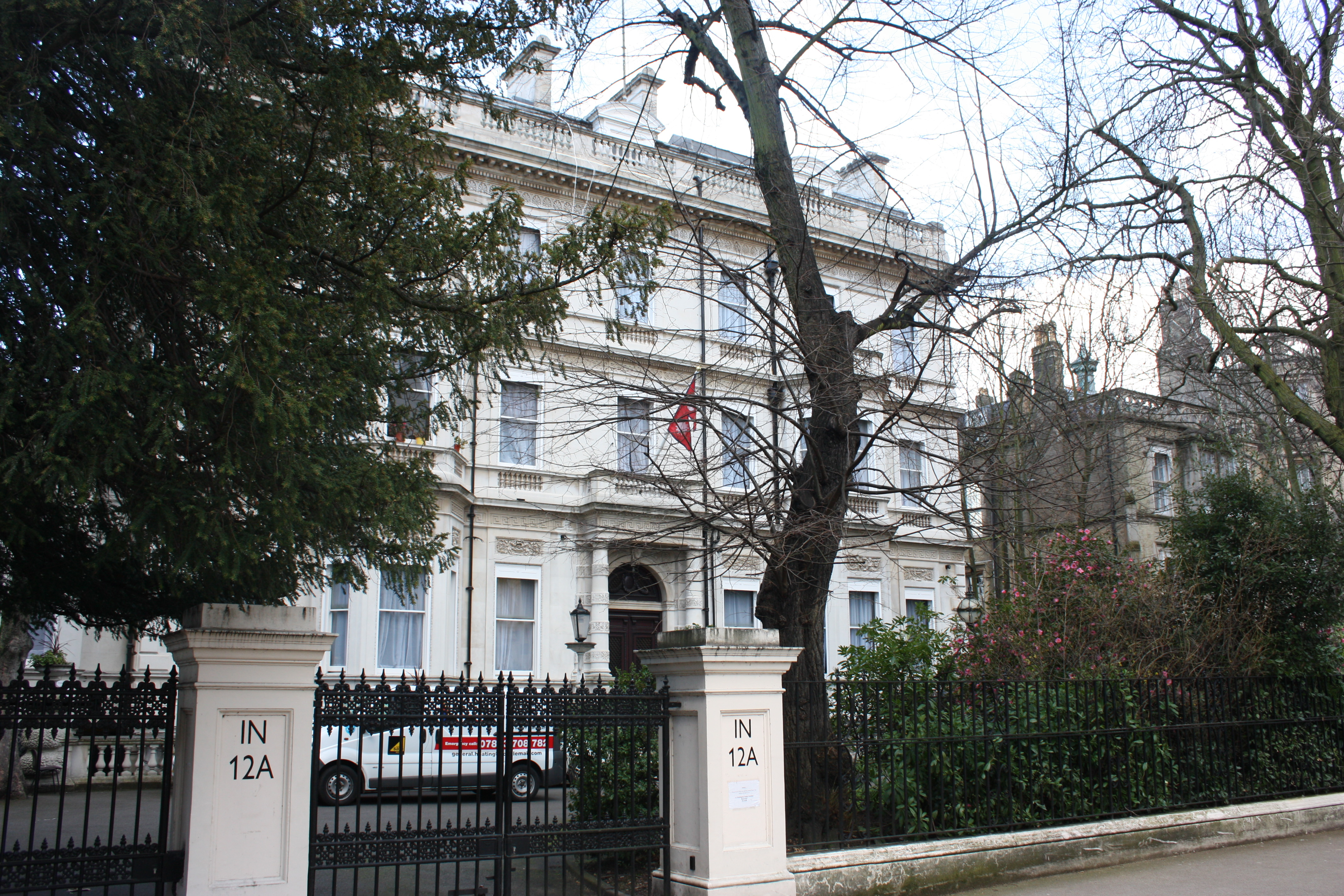
- Location: Holland Park, London
- Address: 12a Kensington Palace Gardens, London, W8 4QU
- Coordinates: 51°30′26.5″N 0°11′28″W
- Ambassador: Mr. Chandra Kumar Ghimire

The Embassy of Nepal in London is the diplomatic mission of Nepal in the United Kingdom. It was built in 1865 then leased to the Nepalese government in 1935 as a gift to thank Nepal for Gurkhas serving the British Empire.

== History ==
The building was erected in 1863-65 for Samuel Morton Peto by the architect James Murray and is a Grade II listed building. Ownership eventually ended up in the hands of The Crown Estate. In 1937, it was leased to the Kingdom of Nepal as their diplomatic mission in London following the signing of the Treaty of Thapathali to formalise diplomatic relations between the United Kingdom and Nepal. It was also done as a gift of thanks for the Nepalese Gurkhas serving in the British Army. In 1980, the Nepalese government paid The Crown Estates £400,000 to extend their lease of the building for 99 years. In 2007, the Nepalese government proposed selling the lease of the building due to maintenance costs being estimated as up to £4.5 million. The embassy would often get reminders from The Crown Estate reminding them of their duties under the lease to keep the building's exterior maintained. Various Royal and Maoist governments attempted to sell the embassy but 2013 was the first serious consideration. They proposed to sell it to Lakshmi Mittal. This followed a trend of various countries downsizing or selling their London embassies due to the cost of maintenance or wishing to profit from the value of the land.

In 2013 there were rumours that the Nepali government were looking to sell the embassy for an anticipated £100 million, citing the huge cost of essential repair work; this caused outrage amongst the Nepali community in Britain. Various retired Gurkhas offered to donate part of their pensions to assist with renovations and retention of the embassy. A case was filed at the Supreme Court of Nepal aiming to block the sale. After a partial stay was granted by the court, the Nepalese government affirmed no decision had been taken on selling the embassy lease.

== Gallery ==
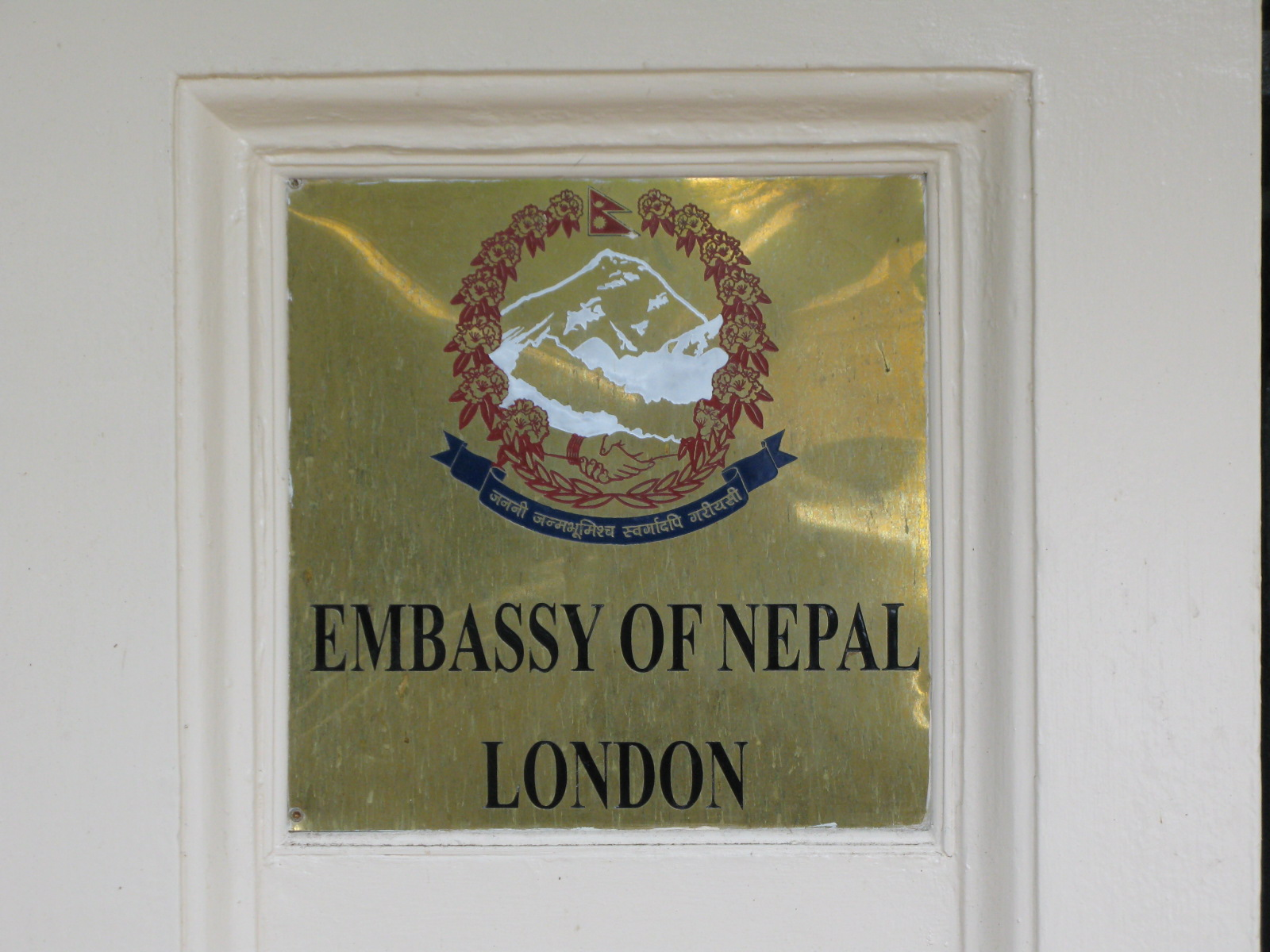
Plaque outside the embassy depicting the Emblem of Nepal

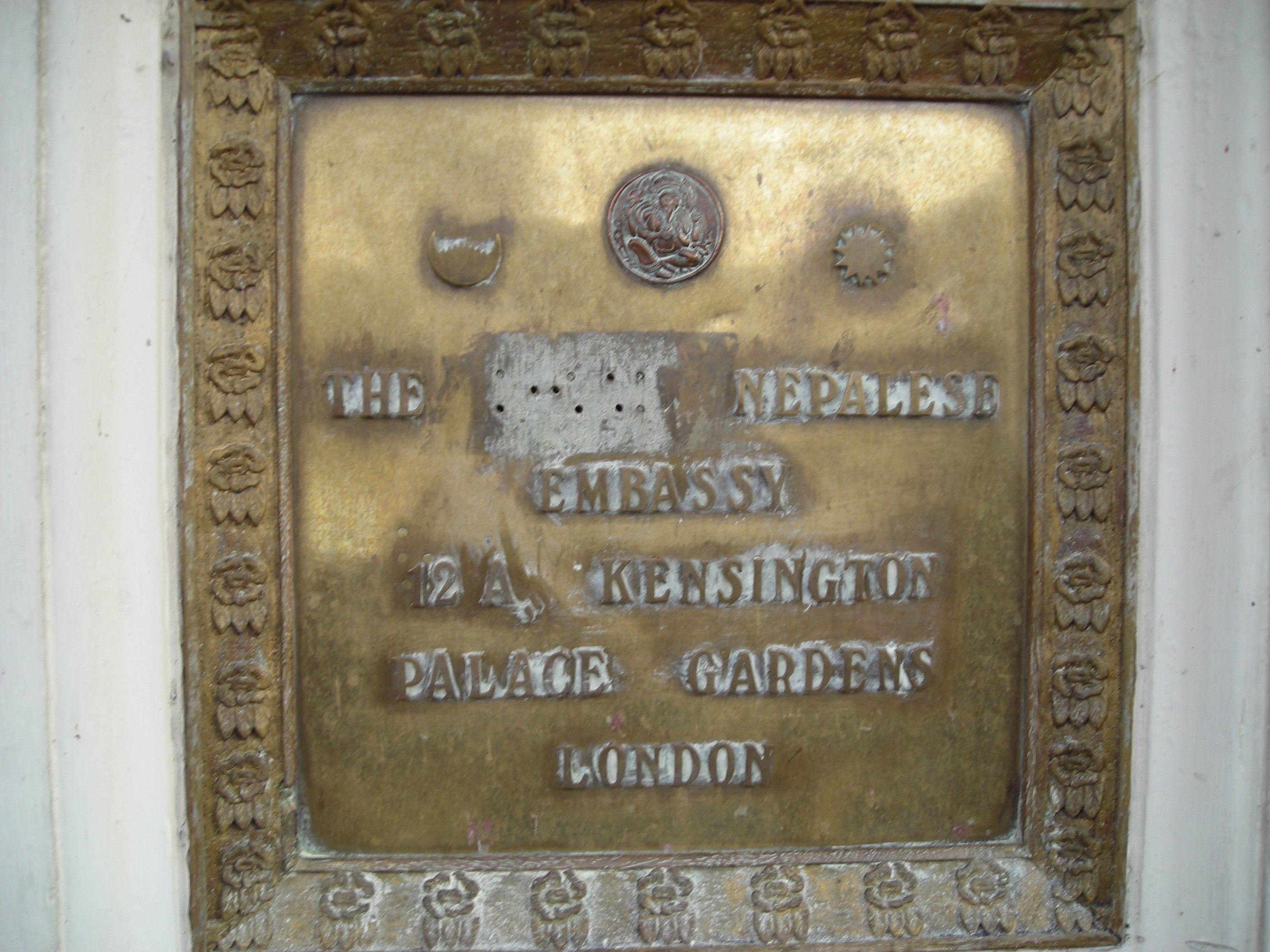
Plaque outside the embassy in 2006 shortly after the signing of the Comprehensive Peace Accord that abolished the Nepalese monarchy
