= Embassy of Slovakia, London =

Embassy of Slovakia in London
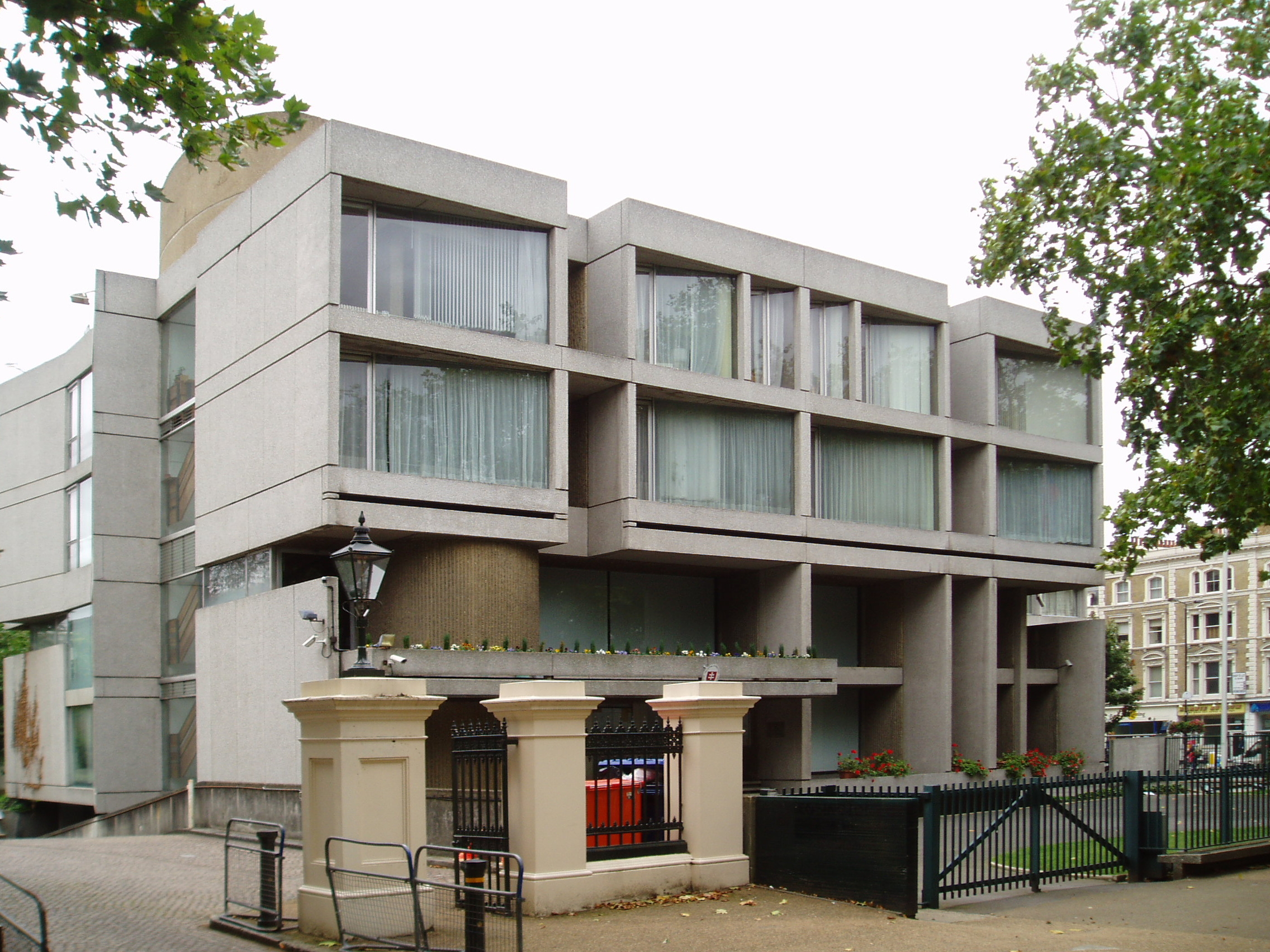
- Entrance from the Kensington Palace Gardens
- Location: Notting Hill Gate, London
- Address: 25 Kensington Palace Gardens, London, W8 4QY
- Coordinates: 51°30′33.3″N 0°11′34.5″W
- Ambassador: Ľubomír Rehák

The Embassy of Slovakia in London is the diplomatic mission of the Slovak Republic in the United Kingdom. It is located at the junction of Kensington Palace Gardens and Bayswater Road in a compound previously shared with the Embassy of the Czech Republic until 1993.

== History ==
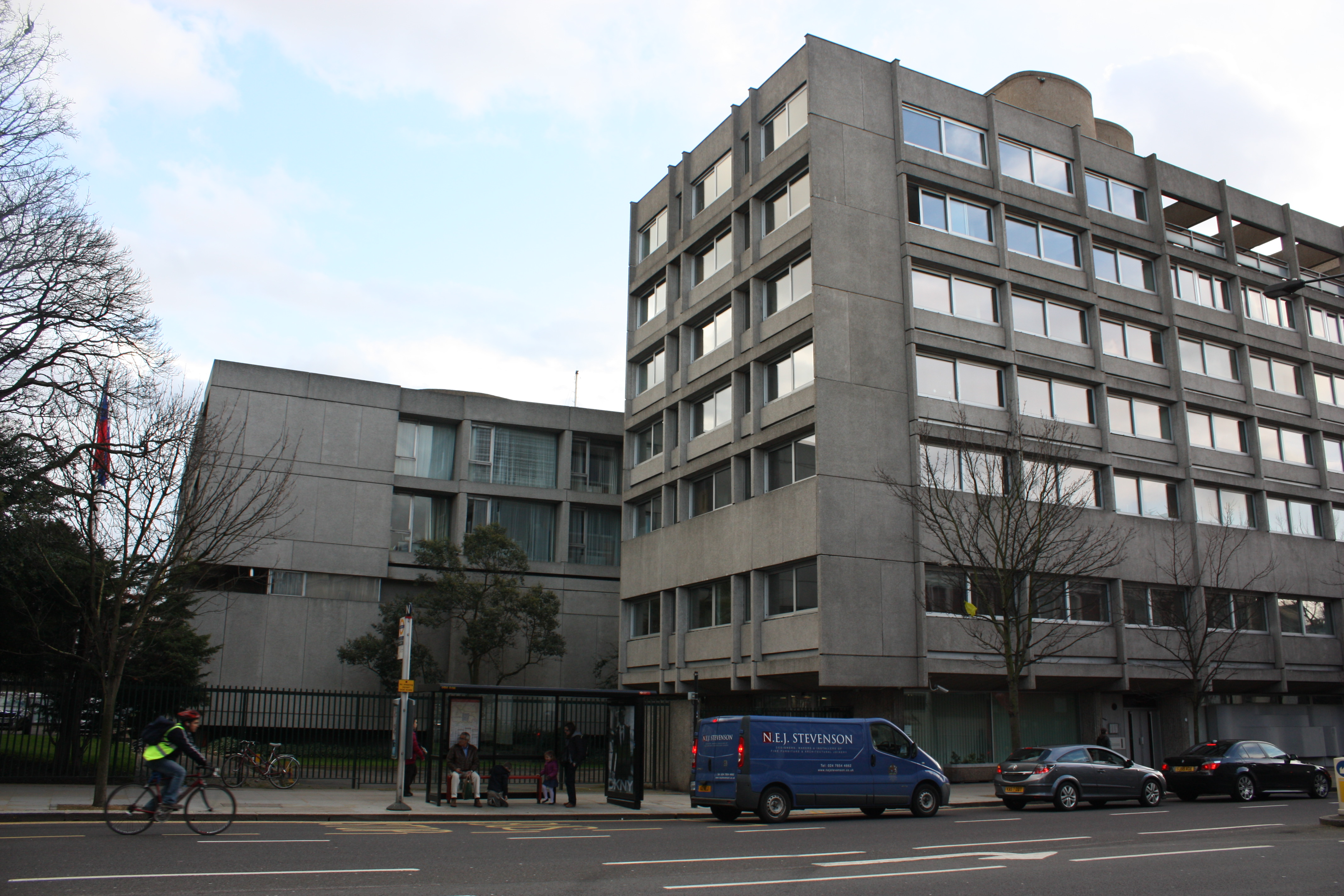

The Embassy of Czechoslovakia was originally located on Grosvenor Place, before moving to the location of the current Czech and Slovak embassies in 1970. The construction of a new brutalist-style building at this site had begun in 1965 and was undertaken by Jan Bočan, Jan Šrámek and Karel Štěpánský from the atelier Beta Prague Project Institute. In 1971 it received an award from the Royal Institute of British Architects for the best building in the United Kingdom created by foreign architects. The building was then divided between the Czech Republic and Slovakia following the dissolution of Czechoslovakia in 1993. Conveniently, the original embassy was already located across two buildings, so was able to be divided easily between the two countries, with Czech Republic taking the building facing Notting Hill Gate and Slovakia taking the building facing Kensington Palace Gardens.

At the time of its original construction, the section which now houses the Slovak embassy housed a reception hall, private dining room, cinema and lounge and conference room. The building is considered one of the prime examples of Brutalist architecture in London. The exterior of the building is built of reinforced concrete and glass panels, along with wood diving the interior sections.
