= Werner Dankwort =

German diplomat (1895–1986)

Carl Werner Dankwort
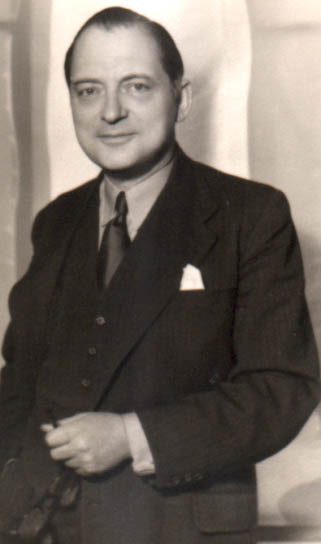
- Dankwort in 1950

German Observer to the United Nations
- In office 1958–1960

German Ambassador to Brazil
- In office 1956–1958

German Ambassador to Canada
- In office 1951–1956
- Preceded by: Office created
- Succeeded by: Hasso von Etzdorf

German Consul General to Canada
- In office 1950–1951
- Preceded by: Office created

First Secretary to the German Legation in Stockholm
- In office 1938–1945

Personal details
- Born: August 13, 1895 Gumbinnen, East Prussia, German Empire (now Gusev, Kaliningrad Oblast, Russia)
- Died: December 19, 1986 (aged 91) Hyannis, Massachusetts, United States
- Education: University of Würzburg
- Occupation: Diplomat

Military service
- Allegiance: German Empire
- Branch/service: Imperial German Navy
- Years of service: 1916
- Rank: Oberleutnant
- Battles/wars: World War I: Bombardment of Yarmouth and Lowestoft

Carl Werner Dankwort (August 13, 1895 – December 19, 1986) born in Gumbinnen, East Prussia (now Gusev, Russia), was a German diplomat who served a major role in bringing Germany into the League of Nations in 1926 prior to representing the German contingent in the Organisation for European Economic Co-operation, the post-World War II effort known as the Marshall Plan.

== Biographical details ==
After completing his Abitur and one semester of law studies, Dankwort served as a soldier in the first World War from September 1914 until November 1918. He received a doctor of jurisprudence degree in 1920 from the University of Würzburg. After a brief time in civil law, he entered the German diplomatic service in 1920 and was assigned as consul to Zurich, Switzerland and shortly afterward to Stockholm, Sweden, in 1927. There he received the Swedish Cross of the Commander of the Order of Vasa. He returned to Bern in 1931. In 1932 and 1933, he participated in the World Disarmament Conference and opposed attempts by the National Socialist Party to infiltrate the Berne consulate in Switzerland. From 1919 on he was a member of the Corps Vandalia Berlin. His opposition resulted in his reassignment to Trieste with no possibility for professional advancement. His previous knowledge of Sweden and his ability to speak the language led to him serving as first secretary for the German legation in Stockholm from 1938 to 1945. According to Erik Boheman (Cabinet Secretary at the Swedish Foreign Ministry), during this time he "saw as his main priority to put legation reporting [to Berlin] in such a way that Sweden would avoid any extreme German measures", helping Sweden to stay out of the war.

In 1945 he issued the German visa to Count Folke Bernadotte which enabled the Count to receive the request from Heinrich Himmler for an armistice. He agreed to serve as a witness for the allies at the Nuremberg Trials, but was instead incarcerated by the British at Bad Nenndorf interrogation centre and in Mecklenburg for 18 months without charges ever being brought against him. During this time (October 1945 – February 1947) he also took up painting.

Dankwort rejoined the West German diplomatic corps in 1950 and was assigned as consul general and then ambassador to Canada in 1951, effectively restoring Germany's relations with Canada after the war. From 1956 to 1958, he served as German ambassador to Brazil, and finally as the West German Observer to the United Nations from 1958 to 1960. He died on December 19, 1986, in Hyannis, Massachusetts.

== Family ==
Dankwort married Irma Salvisberg in 1938 and raised two sons, Rudolf, and Juergen. Werner and his wife both shared anti-Nazi sentiments and both had strong opinions opposing Hitler's rule. The two of them moved to Sweden, a neutral country during World War II. Werner Dankwort's strategic position as Counsellor of the German Delegation in Stockholm enabled him to dissuade Nazi intentions to invade and occupy Sweden which, in turn, permitted that country to serve as a refuge for those in need of protection from Nazi persecution, imprisonment, and extermination

Rudolf completed his undergraduate studies at Harvard University and post-graduate work in electrical engineering at Duke University in North Carolina. He married and settled in Phoenix, Arizona. Juergen returned to Canada rather than remain in the U.S. during the American-led war in Vietnam, and completed his undergraduate and post-graduate studies at McGill University. He obtained his doctorate in social work from the Université de Montréal in 1994 and moved to Vancouver, British Columbia, where he teaches, conducts research, and is a social activist concerning human rights and social injustice. He is director of the Institute on Victimization and Social Injustice. Werner Dankwort's wife, Irma, who volunteered as a hospital aide during the war while in Stockholm, died on February 9, 1999.
