= Douglas P. Lackey =

American philosopher and playwright

Douglas P. Lackey (born August 27, 1945) is an American philosopher and playwright who is also a professor at Baruch College of the City University of New York. Lackey was born in Staten Island, New York.

As a graduate student, he studied under J. N. Findlay at Yale University. His post-graduate work on the ethics of nuclear warfare was influenced by his attention to earlier works by Bertrand Russell. His drama Kaddish in East Jerusalem was produced in 2003. The play was later expanded and revised as The Gandhi Nonviolent Soccer Club. He has also had plays produced about Martin Heidegger and Hannah Arendt, and Ludwig Wittgenstein and Bertrand, Earl Russell.

Lackey divides pacifism into four categories: a universal, Christian view in which all killing is wrong; a universal, Gandhi-based system in which all violence is wrong; private pacificism, following Saint Augustine in seeing personal violence as universally wrong but political violence as sometimes acceptable; and anti-war pacifism, in which personal violence is at times justifiable, but war is never so.

In 1999 Lackey published the results of a survey, undertaken with American university and college philosophy teachers, to decide which were the most popular "modern classics of philosophy". The top ten were, with citations shown (in parentheses) and survey ballots shown [in square brackets]:

1. (179) Ludwig Wittgenstein, Philosophical Investigations [68]
2. (134) Martin Heidegger, Being and Time [51]
3. (131) John Rawls, A Theory of Justice [21]
4. (77) Ludwig Wittgenstein, Tractatus Logico-Philosophicus [24]
5. (64) Bertrand Russell and A. N. Whitehead, Principia Mathematica [27]
6. (63) W. V. O. Quine, Word and Object [7]
7. (56) Saul Kripke, Naming and Necessity [5]
8. (51) Thomas Kuhn, The Structure of Scientific Revolutions [3]
9. (38) Jean-Paul Sartre, Being and Nothingness [4]
10. (34) A. N. Whitehead, Process and Reality [16]

== Works ==
- Moral Principles and Nuclear Weapons, 1984.
- The Ethics of War and Peace, 1989.
- Ethics and Strategic Fefense: American philosophers debate Star Wars and the future of nuclear deterrence, 1989.
- God, Immortality, Ethics: a concise introduction to philosophy Editions published between 1990 and 2001.
