= Bad Nenndorf interrogation centre =

Post-war British interrogation centre known for human rights abuses

Coordinates: 52°20′09″N 9°22′25″E

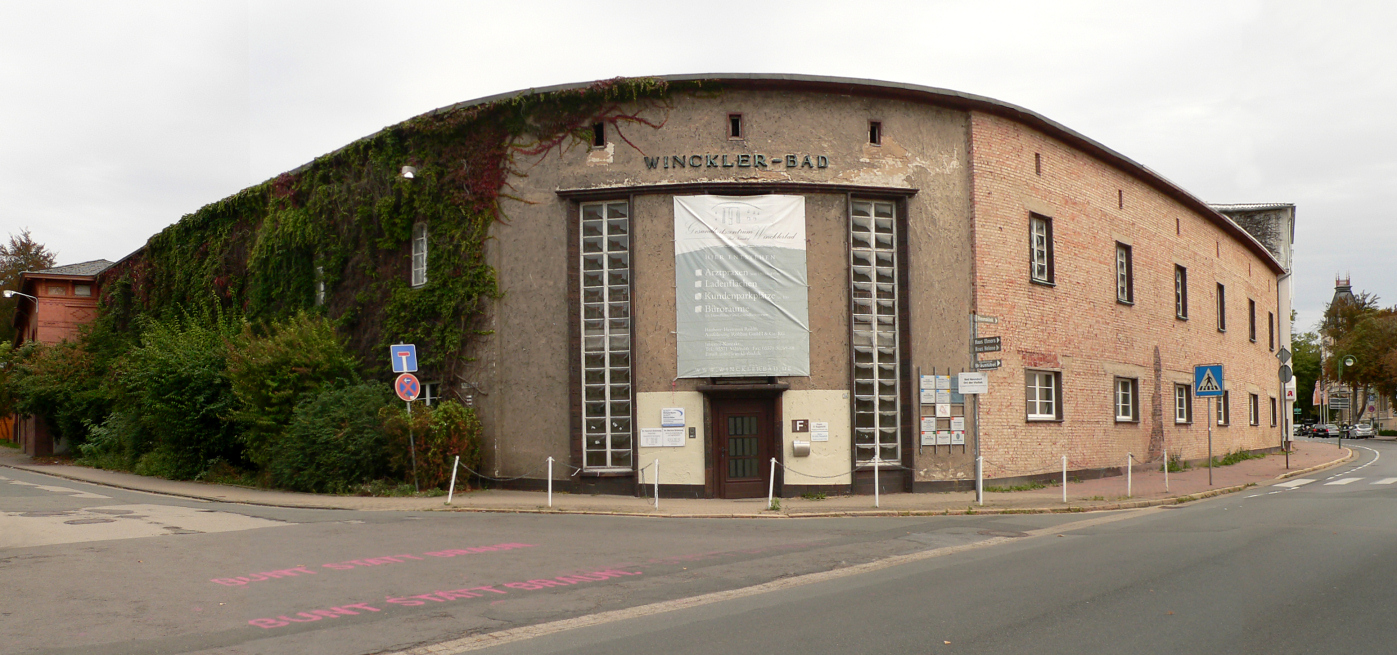
The Winckler-Bath in Bad Nenndorf (photographed 2012) in which the No. 74 interrogation centre was established

The Bad Nenndorf interrogation centre was a British Combined Services Detailed Interrogation Centre (CSDIC) located within the Winckler-Bath (German: Winckler-Bad) complex and adjacent buildings, in the West German town of Bad Nenndorf, district of Schaumburg, Lower Saxony. This was located in the British Occupation zone in Germany. The interrogation centre operated from June 1945 to July 1947. Allegations of mistreatment of detainees by British troops resulted in a police investigation, a public controversy in both Britain and Germany, and the eventual closure of the interrogation centre. Four of the centre's officers were brought before courts martial in 1948; one of the four was convicted on charges of neglect, and dismissed from service.

The Winckler-Bath complex was named after Axel Winckler, a doctor from Bad Nenndorf and a leading balneologist.

== Background ==
The British authorities opened No. 74 Combined Services Detailed Interrogation Centre (74 CSDIC) in June 1945. The interrogation centre was based in the peat pulp bath (Schlammbad) or mud bath complex in Bad Nenndorf, with the former bathing chambers being converted into prison cells. It was the successor to an earlier interrogation centre at Diest in Belgium, and was run by a combination of military and intelligence officers under War Office authority. Several other CSDIC interrogation centres had existed during World War II, in the UK at Ham in London, and Huntercombe near Henley-on-Thames, and in the Mediterranean (CMF) Rome at Cinecittà, Middle East (MEF) centre Ma'adi near Cairo, and South Asia, but these had closed by the time No. 74 CSDIC had opened.

The interrogation centre was originally intended to intern former Nazis (Schutzstaffel (SS), Sturmabteilung (SA), and Gestapo) for interrogation, but its remit was expanded to include a number of people suspected of carrying out espionage for the Soviet Union. As well as Germans, these included Russians, Czechs, and Hungarians. During the interrogation centre's two years of operation, a total of 372 men and 44 women were held there.

There exists a first-hand written account of the daily experiences of the former head of the political department of the German legation in Stockholm between 1939 and 1945. Ambassador Werner Dankwort's memoirs include numerous chapters of his lengthy internment at Bad Nenndorf between 1945–1947. The memoirs are archived at the German Department of Foreign Affairs in Berlin.

== Allegations of abuse ==
From the outset, the interrogation centre appears to have had organisational problems. The commanding officer, Lieutenant colonel Robin Stephens, noted that its staffing,

was generous, but in practice was never filled. Later there was a reduction to the bone. That was inevitable owing to treasury requirements. Then trouble began. Work was on the increase, demobilisation took [a] heavy toll and replacements were inexperienced.

In January and February 1947, a number of prisoners from No. 74 CSDIC were taken to a civilian hospital in Rotenburg, near Bremen, suffering from frostbite, malnutrition, and a variety of physical injuries. Two of the prisoners subsequently died. British medical and military personnel at the hospital were shocked at the poor condition of the prisoners, and complained to their superiors, prompting senior British Army officers to commission an investigation by Inspector Thomas Hayward of the Metropolitan Police.

In March 1947, the British Labour Party Member of Parliament Richard Stokes (Ipswich) visited the interrogation centre as part of a long-running effort on his part to promote the welfare of prisoners of war and other post-war detainees. He told the House of Commons that,

in cross-examining some of these [prisoners] it may be necessary to indulge in forms of verbal persecution which we do not like, but there is no physical torture, starvation or ill-treatment of that kind.

However, he criticised the poor conditions at the interrogation centre. The 65 men and 4 women being held there were mostly in solitary confinement, in unheated cells at temperatures of −10 °C (14 °F); the interrogation centre had no coal for heating, so the prisoners had instead been given seven blankets each.

Inspector Hayward's investigation, which appears to have been concluded after Richard Stokes' visit to No. 74 CSDIC, produced a list of serious allegations of abuse. These were later summarised in a Foreign Office memo:

(1) insufficient clothing; (2) intimidation by the guards; (3) mental and physical torture during the interrogations; (4) they were kept in solitary confinement for long periods with no exercise; (5) they were confined to punishment cells, not for any offence, but simply because the interrogator was not satisfied with their answers; (6) in the punishment cells, during the bitter winter, they were deprived of certain articles of clothing, had buckets of cold water thrown into the cell and were forced to scrub the cell floor for long periods, and were assaulted and man-handled; (7) medical attention was grossly inadequate; (8) food was insufficient; (9) discharge of prisoners was unnecessarily delayed; (10) personal property of the prisoners were stolen

— Camp 020

The report caused dismay among British government officials, who recognised the serious damage that the case could do to Britain's international image. The Chancellor of the Duchy of Lancaster, Frank Pakenham, noted that,

we are alleged to have treated internees in a manner reminiscent of the German concentration camps.

The junior Foreign Office minister, Hector McNeil, told Foreign Secretary Ernest Bevin:

I doubt if I can put too strongly the parliamentary consequences of publicity. Whenever we have any allegations to make about the political police methods in Eastern European states, it will be enough to call out in the House 'Bad Nenndorf', and no reply is left to us.

The interrogation centre's highly secret nature was another complicating factor. The army cautioned against allowing the Soviets to discover "how we apprehended and treated their agents", not least because it might deter future defectors. However, the affair was still brought before Army courts martial, though some of the evidence was heard behind closed doors to ensure that security was safeguarded. The interrogation centre was closed down in July 1947.

== Courts martial ==
Four British Army officers were indicted for a number of offences against the Army Act. Charges were brought against Lieutenant Colonel Robin Stephens, the commandant of No. 74 CSDIC; Lieutenant Richard Oliver Langham, Royal Armoured Corps (RAC); Captain John Stuart Smith, Royal Army Medical Corps (RAMC), and Captain Frank Edmunds, Intelligence Corps (IC). Stephens was charged on four counts: conduct prejudicial to good order and military discipline, failure in his duty as supervisor of the facility, and two counts of disgraceful conduct of a cruel kind. Langham and Edmunds were charged with two counts of disgraceful conduct of a cruel kind, though Edmunds' case was abandoned on a technicality before his court martial began. Smith, the interrogation centre doctor, faced the most serious charges: two counts of manslaughter and fourteen of professional neglect. Stephens, Langham and Smith were ordered for trial by courts martial in three separate proceedings held in Britain and Hamburg between March and July 1948. All of the defendants pleaded not guilty.

=== Langham ===
Lieutenant Richard Oliver Langham of the Royal Armoured Corps (RAC), who was originally a German citizen, was a member of an interrogation team which included Captain Frank Edmunds of the Intelligence Corps (IC). He was accused of having mistreated two former members of the Schutzstaffel (SS): Horst Mahnke and Rudolf Oebser-Roeder, who were suspected of helping to organise acts of terrorism. The two prisoners claimed to have been beaten up, tortured with lighted cigarettes, doused in cold water, and subjected to threats. Langham denied the claims, and cited medical records that showed that Roeder had not made any mention of his alleged mistreatment to the German doctor at the interrogation centre. For his part, Roeder claimed that he had not complained because he had thought the doctor was too "timid". Former Company sergeant major (CSM) Samuel Mathers testified that there had been no torture, though he admitted to having "pushed [the prisoners] around for a few minutes". Sergeant Edmund Sore told the court martial that he had been given orders by Mathers to "drive [Roeder] round the cell for about two hours", and Lance corporal A. R. S. Hunt testified that the reason given for the treatment was that the two Germans were "part of an organisation which was to start a rising on Hitler's birthday".

Langham's defence complained that the prosecution had failed to prove that Langham had anything to do with the "curious things" that had admittedly occurred at Bad Nenndorf. According to his lawyer, there were numerous inconsistencies between the two prisoners' claims, and there was no evidence at all of the more extreme "tortures" ever having been carried out. Langham was said to have had no part at all "in the brutality of April 17, 1946, whether he was duty officer at that time or not".

The court martial accepted Langham's arguments, and on 31 March 1948 he was acquitted on both counts.

=== Smith ===
The court martial of Captain John Stuart Smith of the Royal Army Medical Corps (RAMC) opened on 7 April 1948 in Hamburg, West Germany. He was accused of having abused nine German detainees during the exceptionally harsh winter of 1946–47, allowing prisoners to be subjected to cruel treatment, including having cold water thrown over them, depriving them of boots, and making them continually scrub the cell floors. Two of the nine detainees were said to have died from this treatment.

Over 40 witnesses were called by the prosecution and defence. The court martial heard accounts of physical abuse from a number of prisoners, some of whom sustained serious physical injuries such as frostbite. One of the former interrogators at Bad Nenndorf testified that some of the Army warders at the camp were themselves ex-convicts. For his part, Smith denied any responsibility for the abuse, and described the camp as a "bestial hole" which was "full of people who, unknown to him, were being brutally treated". He testified that he had been sent one prisoner who was suffering from meningitis, but had been unable to obtain an ambulance to transport him to hospital.

The court martial dismissed three of the charges of professional neglect against Smith before the conclusion of the trial. It found him not guilty of the two counts of manslaughter or six of the eleven counts of professional neglect. However, it found him guilty of five of the neglect charges, and he was sentenced to be dismissed from service.

=== Stephens ===
The final court martial was that of Lieutenant Colonel Robin Stephens, the commandant of No. 74 CSDIC, which opened in June 1948. On the first day of proceedings, both counts of disgraceful conduct of a cruel kind were withdrawn, leaving only the counts of 'conduct prejudicial to good order and military discipline', and failure in his duty as commandant.

Stephens was uncompromisingly blunt about the prisoners who had made accusations, declaring that,

their motives are invariably foul, most of them are degenerates, most of them come diseased from V.D., many are chronic medical cases ... they are pathological liars, and the value of their Christian oath is therefore doubtful.

He told the court martial that he had instituted the same basic regime as had operated at Camp 020, a CSDIC facility in London which he had previously commanded with great success during the war. Prisoners were to be treated firmly:

No chivalry. No gossip. No cigarettes ... Figuratively, a spy in war should be at the point of a bayonet.

However, physical coercion was forbidden under any circumstances, as it was seen as ineffective:

Violence is taboo, for not only does it produce answers to please, but it lowers the standard of information.

Most of the case was heard behind closed doors due to security concerns. The court martial concluded on 20 July 1948 with Stephens being found not guilty on all charges.

== Closure of No. 74 CSDIC ==
Three months after the closure of No. 74 CSDIC at Bad Nenndorf, a new custom-built interrogation centre with cells for 30 men and 10 women was opened at Gütersloh. Most of the interrogators were said to have served at Bad Nenndorf, causing disquiet in the government. Foreign Office Minister Frank Pakenham demanded that "drastic methods" should not be employed. However, the Army insisted that the standards applied in British prisons should not be applied to Army interrogation centres in Germany. According to the German newspaper Die Zeit, the failings exposed at Bad Nenndorf resulted in the conditions of prisoners elsewhere in Germany being improved to the point that they were better treated than the civilian population.

== Recent information ==
On 17 December 2005, the British newspaper The Guardian published an account of the Bad Nenndorf case, based on recently declassified files. The report was followed up on 30 January 2006 by the Hamburg-based German broadcaster Norddeutscher Rundfunk (NDR), working on 800 pages of declassified documents that they received. In its 3 April 2006 issue, the Guardian published pictures of the emaciated German prisoners held in Bad Nenndorf, calling it a "cold war torture camp". The reports caused a brief political controversy in both Britain and Germany, with some commentators drawing explicit parallels with the more recent allegations of mistreatment of prisoners in the Iraq conflict and the war on terror.

On 29 July 2006, neo-Nazis held a rally at the site of the former interrogation centre. A coalition of opponents organised a rally in protest, among them the local chapter of the German Trade Union Confederation (Deutscher Gewerkschaftsbund; DGB). A DGB leaflet objects the attempt to "revise history".

== Usage today ==
As of 2026, the building houses senior apartments, a spa complex and medical practices.

== See also ==
- London Cage
- Rheinwiesenlager—allegations of mistreatment of prisoners
- Malmedy massacre trial—allegations of torture of prisoners
- Prisoner-of-war camp
