= James J. Weingartner =

American historian (born 1940)

James J. Weingartner (born 1940) is professor emeritus of history at Southern Illinois University at Edwardsville. He is a specialist in German history and the history of Nazism. He is a graduate of the University of Wisconsin at Madison.

== Selected publications ==
- Hitler's Guard: The Story of the Leibstandarte SS Adolf Hitler 1933-1945. Southern Illinois University Press, 1975. ISBN 0809306824
- Crossroads of Death: The Story of the Malmedy Massacre and Trial. University of California Press, Berkeley, 1979. ISBN 0520036239
- "Trophies of War: U.S. Troops and the Mutilation of Japanese War Dead, 1941-1945", Pacific Historical Review, Vol. 61, No. 1 (Feb. 1992), pp. 53–67. DOI: 10.2307/3640788
- A Peculiar Crusade: Willis M.Everett and the Malmedy Massacre Trial. New York University Press, 2000. ISBN 978-0814793664
- Americans, Germans, and War Crimes Justice: Law, Memory, and "The Good War". Praeger, Santa Barbara, 2011. ISBN 978-0313381928
