= Ramansdrift =

Ghost town in Namibia

Ramansdrift is an abandoned town on the banks of the Orange River in the ǁKaras Region of Namibia. The nearest towns are Vredendal (28.8 km), Gaobis (28.8 km), Silwerstroom (32.6 km), and Hakiesdoorn (48.3 km).

The first Boers set out north from what is now Little Namaqualand to found settlements such as Kakamas, Ramansdrift, Schuitdrift, and Sendelindgsdrift.

On January 12, 1915, South African forces invaded German South West Africa by attacking the police station in Ramansdrift. The Boers were incensed by this, sparking the Maritz rebellion. The Battle of Sandfontein took place north of the drift on September 26, 1914.
