= Kensington Palace Gardens =

Street in west central London, England

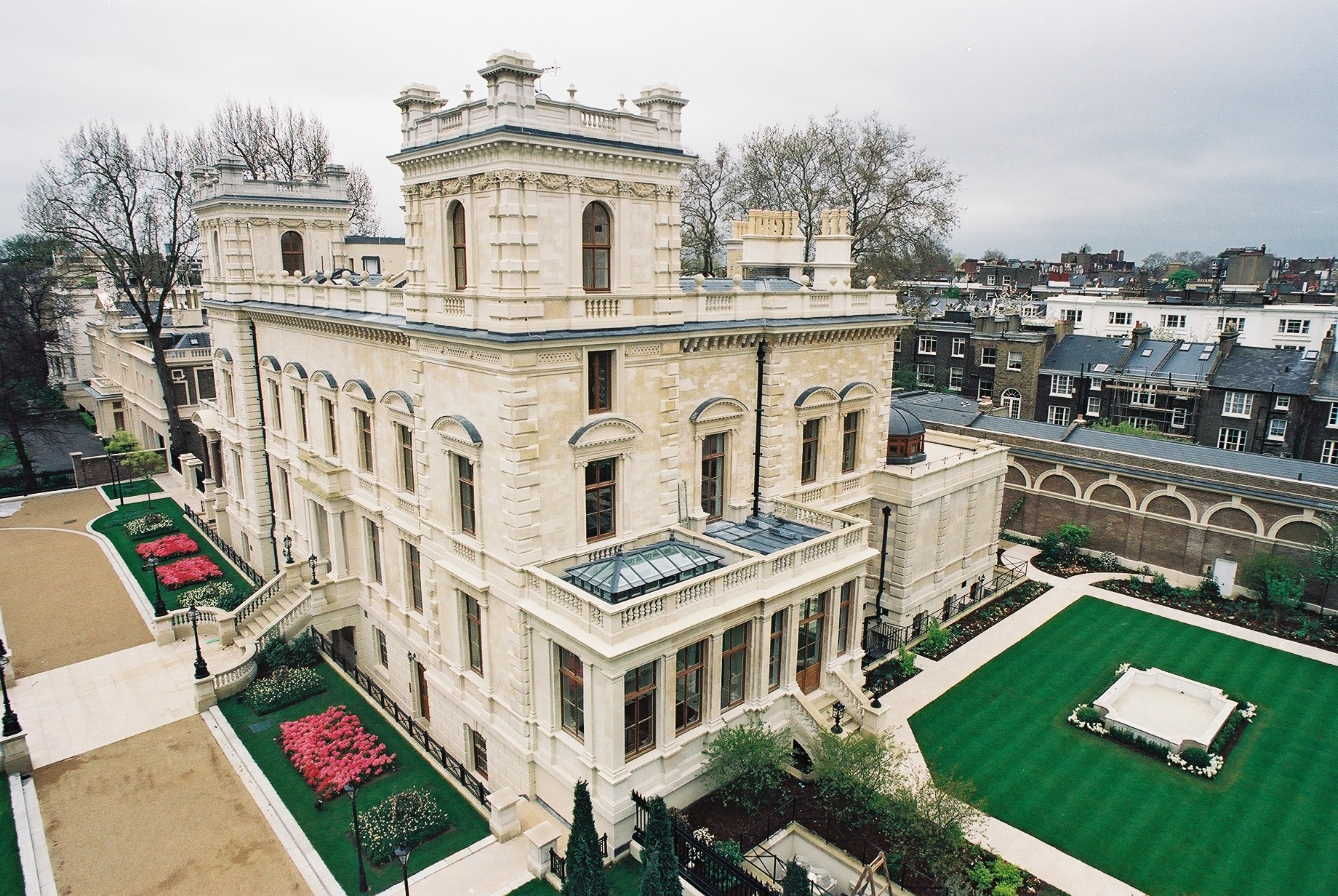
- One of the mansions on the street of Kensington Palace Gardens
- Interactive map of Kensington Palace Gardens
- Former name: The Queen's Road
- Location: Kensington, London, England
- Coordinates: 51°30′24″N 0°11′27″W
- From: Notting Hill Gate
- To: Kensington High Street

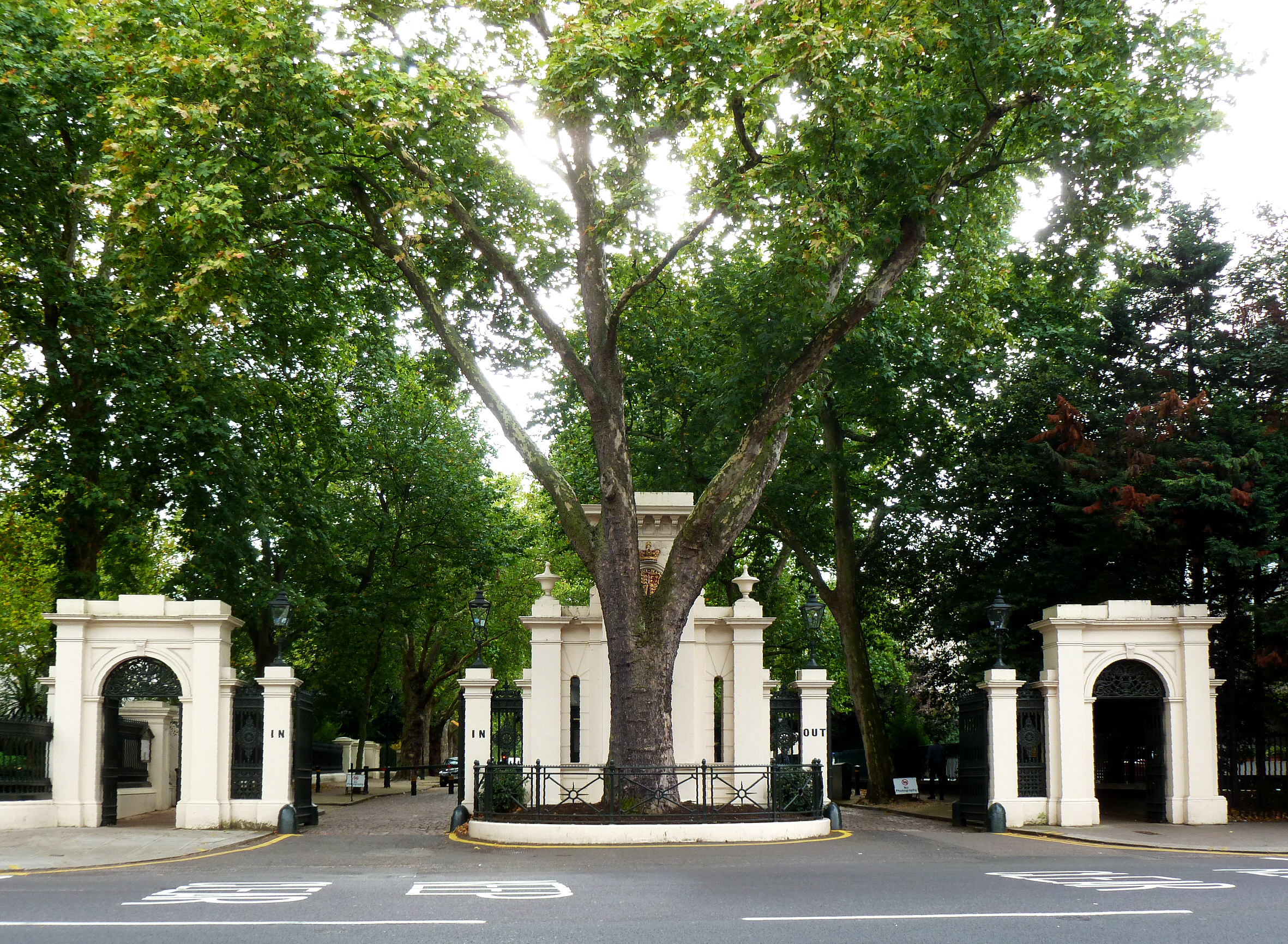
Entrance gates at the north end of Kensington Palace Gardens guarded by sentry boxes

Kensington Palace Gardens is an exclusive street in Kensington, west of central London, near Kensington Gardens and Kensington Palace. Entered through gates at either end and guarded by sentry boxes, it was the location of the London Cage, the British government MI19 centre used during the Second World War and the Cold War. Several foreign diplomatic missions are located along it.

A tree-lined avenue half a mile long and studded with embassies, Kensington Palace Gardens is one of the most expensive residential streets in the world, and has long been known as "Billionaires Row", due to the huge wealth of its private residents, although in fact the majority of its current occupants are either national embassies or ambassadorial residences. As of late-2018, market prices for a property in the street average over £35 million.

It connects Notting Hill Gate with Kensington High Street. The southern section of Kensington Palace Gardens is called Palace Green.

== Background ==
Originally called The Queen's Road, the road was built from the 1840s on part of the grounds of Kensington Palace; the freehold still belongs to the Crown Estate. It was renamed Kensington Palace Gardens around 1870 when London planes were planted in the avenue. The palace, which is the residence of the Prince and Princess of Wales, the Duke and Duchess of Gloucester, Duke of Kent and Duchess of Kent, and Prince and Princess Michael of Kent, fronts the southern part of the street on the eastern side. The houses at the northern end are mostly Italianate, while those at the southern end are mostly in the Queen Anne style.

For much of the 20th century, a large proportion of the houses were occupied by embassies and ambassadors' residences. Some still are, but others have been renovated by the Crown Estate and let to private buyers on long leases. One of these was bought in 2004 by the Indian steel tycoon Lakshmi Mittal, who in 2008 was listed by Forbes magazine as the fourth richest man in the world. The sale was widely misreported at £70 million, before accurate figures were available from HM Land Registry, where records state that on 30 June 2004, 18–19 Kensington Palace Gardens, along with three mews houses at the rear of the property, sold for £57,145,967.

The mansion at 18 Kensington Palace Gardens, historically belonging to the Rothschild family, was sold in 2001.

No. 8 was used as an interrogation centre for German POWs during and after the Second World War and was known as the London Cage. The house was demolished in 1961 and replaced by a glass-and-steel block of four apartments designed by Richard Seifert and completed in 1964. Flat 3 was on the market in 2006 as a three-bedroom apartment designed by international architect David Chipperfield, valued at a minimum of £13.25 million through Knight Frank, which sold in March 2007 for £10.29m.

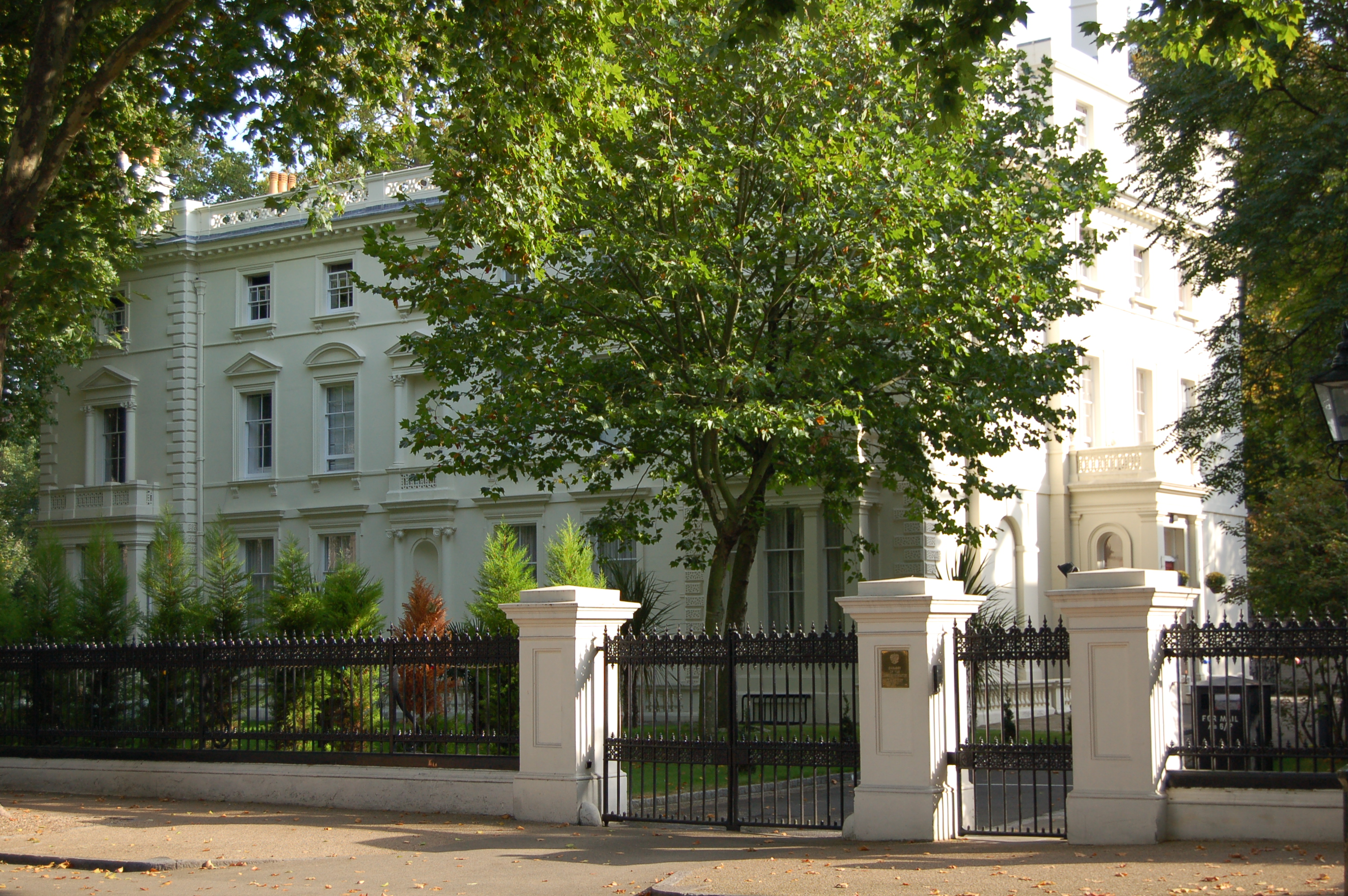
Chancery of the Russian Federation

Diplomatic buildings on the street are: the Russian Embassy at Nos. 6–7; the Embassy of Nepal at No. 12A; the Embassy of Lebanon at No. 21; and the Embassy of Slovakia at No. 25. In Palace Green are the Embassy of Israel at No. 2 and the Embassy of Romania at No. 4. Egypt, Laos and the Philippines formerly had their embassies here. No. 11 has been the official residence of the French Ambassador since 1944; it was rebuilt after a fire in December 1990.

Due to the presence of likely terrorist targets—embassies etc., including those of Russia and Israel—both ends of the street have armed police checkpoints (Diplomatic Protection Group officers) with crash barriers as well as the original wrought-iron gates. Entry of pedestrians is not normally controlled, only vehicles. This has the side effect of leading to extremely low traffic volumes for a central London street. Some of the buildings occasionally set up barriers to keep vehicles at a distance.

The street is lit by Victorian gaslight streetlights.

== Notable residents ==
The street is the residence of many ambassadors and royal family members, including those of Saudi Arabia, UAE, and India.

No. 10 was designed by Philip Hardwick for Sutherland Hall Sutherland, and the first tenant was the civil engineer James Meadows Rendel, who probably became resident in early 1852, and died there in 1856. In 1862, Edmund Ernst Leopold Schlesinger Benzon, a German-born steel magnate, moved in and lived there until his death in 1873. In 1896, the financier Leopold Hirsch had "substantial alterations" made, designed by Leonard Stokes, and he was resident until at least 1904. No. 10 was home to the USSR Embassy from 1960 to 1986.

Sir Frederick Wills, 1st Baronet (1838–1909), a member of the Wills tobacco family, had a London residence at No. 9, but now it serves as the residence of the Indian High Commissioner. Famous residents included Israeli billionaire Noam Gottesman and Indian billionaire Lakshmi Mittal.

Robert William Perks, (1849–1934), bought No.11 in 1894, and lived there with his family until his death. Following Perks's death, the property was sold to the Duke of Marlborough.

Samuel Montagu, 1st Baron Swaythling (1832-1911), had his London residence at No.12.

The film producer Alexander Korda had his home at No.20 and died there.

Princess Haya of Jordan resides in a home in Kensington Palace Gardens.

Ukrainian-born billionaire Len Blavatnik bought a property on the street.

No. 16 is owned by Russian billionaire Roman Abramovich, a 15-bedroom mansion that he bought for £90 million in 2009. The house was built in 1846, and designed by T. H. Wyatt and D. Brandon for John Sperling of Norbury Park. In 1972, it was home to the Soviet Embassy.

== See also ==
- 13 Kensington Palace Gardens
- List of most expensive streets by city
- The Bishops Avenue
