= MI19 =

Department of British military intelligence (historical)

MI19 was a section of the British Directorate of Military Intelligence, part of the War Office. During the Second World War it was responsible for obtaining information from enemy prisoners of war.

It was originally created in December 1940 as MI9a, a sub-section of MI9. A year later, in December 1941, it became an independent organisation, though still closely associated with its parent.

MI19 had Combined Services Detailed Interrogation Centres (CSDIC) at Beaconsfield, Wilton Park, and Latimer, as well as a number overseas. Beginning in 1940, MI19 recorded conversations between German officers held comfortably at Trent Park in North London; many important secrets were learned from that effort. MI19 operated an interrogation centre in Kensington Palace Gardens, London, commanded by Lt. Col. Alexander Scotland OBE, known as the "London Cage". It was a subject of persistent reports of torture by the prisoners confined there, which included war crimes suspects from the SS and Gestapo held in the facility after the war.

The BBC reported that MI-19 staff were sent to the Channel Islands in 1945 to look for evidence of collaboration during the German occupation. The intent may have been to silence speculation.

== See also ==
- War Office
- Directorate of Military Intelligence (United Kingdom)
