= Combined Services Detailed Interrogation Centre =

The UK used Combined Services Detailed Interrogation Centres (CSDICs) as facilities domestically and on the continent (Belgium and Germany), in the Middle East and in South Asia between 1942 and 1947. British War Office ran them on a joint basis with the British Army and various intelligence agencies, notably MI5 and MI9. The CSDICs on the European mainland were:

- a CSDIC at Diest in Belgium
- the Bad Nenndorf interrogation centre at Bad Nenndorf in Germany
- CSDIC(I)-Z Section, at 49 St George's Drive, Pimlico, London
- CSDIC(I)-X Section in Italy

The UK originally established them to interrogate detainees, defectors, and prisoners of war known or suspected to be working for Nazi Germany and Japan. After the war, they held suspected Soviet agents for interrogation. The last CSDIC facility, the Bad Nenndorf interrogation centre, closed in June 1947. CSDIC(I) X and Z Sections closed on 30 November 1945.

== See also ==
- London Cage
- Camp 020
- CSDIC(I)
- Trent Park § Second World War - the "Cockfosters Cage"
