= London Cage =

WW2-era facility in London known for human rights abuses

Coordinates: 51.5087°N 0.1914°W

Location of the London Cage in Kensington and Chelsea

The London Cage was an MI19 prisoner-of-war facility during and after the Second World War to mainly interrogate captured Germans, including SS personnel and members of the Nazi Party. The unit, which was located within numbers 6, 7 and 8 Kensington Palace Gardens in London, was itself investigated following accusations that it often used torture to extract information. It was wound down in early 1948.

== History ==
The United Kingdom systematically interrogated all of its prisoners of war. A "cage" for interrogation of prisoners was established in 1940 in each command area of the United Kingdom, manned by officers trained by Alexander Scotland, the head of the Prisoner of War Interrogation Section (PWIS) of the Intelligence Corps (Field Security Police).

The cages varied in facilities. The Doncaster Cage used a portion of the town's racecourse as a camp, while the Catterick and Loughborough cages were in bare fields. The London Cage, located in a fashionable part of the city, had space for 60 prisoners, was equipped with five interrogation rooms, and staffed by 10 officers serving under Scotland, plus a dozen non-commissioned officers (NCOs) who served as interrogators and interpreters. Security was provided by soldiers from the Guards regiments selected "for their height rather than their brains." Many of the British NCOs were fluent in German, and were skilled in persuading prisoners to reveal information. Some wore Soviet uniforms due to the Germans' fear of the Russians.

After the war, the PWIS became known as the War Crimes Investigation Unit (WCIU), and the London Cage became the headquarters for questioning suspected war criminals. Among the German war criminals confined at the London Cage was SS Obersturmbannführer Fritz Knöchlein, who was in charge of the murder of 97 British prisoners who had surrendered at Le Paradis, France, in May 1940. Knöchlein was convicted and hanged in 1949.

Alexander Scotland participated in the interrogation of General Kurt Meyer, who was accused of participating in a massacre of Canadian troops. Meyer was eventually sentenced to death, although the sentence was not carried out. Scotland observed that Meyer received milder treatment after news of the atrocity had grown "cold".

SS and police leader Jakob Sporrenberg was interrogated at the cage after the war, which helped to establish his responsibility for the deaths of 46,000 Jews in Poland toward the end of the war. Sporrenberg was sentenced to death by a Polish court in Warsaw in 1950 and hanged on 6 December 1952.

Other war criminals passing through the London Cage after the war included Sepp Dietrich, an SS general accused of but never prosecuted for the murder of British prisoners in 1940. Alexander Scotland participated in the investigation of the SS and Gestapo men who murdered 50 escaped prisoners from Stalag Luft III in 1944, in the aftermath of what became known as the "Great Escape". The London Cage closed in 1948.

== Torture allegations ==
Alexander Scotland wrote a postwar memoir entitled London Cage, which was submitted to the War Office in 1950 for purposes of censorship. Scotland was asked to abandon the book, and threatened with a prosecution under the Official Secrets Act, and officers from Special Branch raided his home. The Foreign Office insisted that the book be suppressed altogether, as it would help persons "agitating on behalf of war criminals". An assessment of the manuscript by MI5 listed how Scotland had detailed repeated breaches of the 1929 Geneva Convention, including instances of prisoners being forced to kneel while being beaten about the head, forced to stand to attention for up to 26 hours, and threatened with execution and "an unnecessary operation". The book was eventually published in 1957 after a seven-year delay, and after all incriminating material had been redacted.

In London Cage, Scotland claimed that confessions were obtained by seizing upon discrepancies in the accounts of prisoners, and stated:

We were not so foolish as to imagine that petty violence, nor even violence of a stronger character, was likely to produce the results hoped for in dealing with some of the toughest creatures of the Hitler regime.

While denying "sadism", Scotland said things were done that were "mentally just as cruel". One "cheeky and obstinate" prisoner, he said, was forced to strip naked and exercise. This "deflated him completely" and he began to talk. Prisoners were sometimes forced to stand "round the clock", and "if a prisoner wanted to pee he had to do it there and then, in his clothes. It was surprisingly effective."

Scotland refused to allow Red Cross inspections at the London Cage, on the grounds that the prisoners there were either civilians or "criminals within the armed services."

In September 1940, Guy Liddell, director of MI5's counterintelligence B Division, said that,

Scotland turned up this morning with a syringe containing some drug or other, which it was thought would induce the prisoner [Tate] to speak.

Schmidt subsequently became a double agent against the Germans as part of the Double Cross System of double agents operated by MI5.

In 1943, allegations of mistreatment at the London Cage resulted in a formal protest by MI5 director Maxwell Knight to the Secretary of State for War. The allegations were made by Otto Witt, a German anti-Nazi who was interrogated to determine if he was acting on behalf of German intelligence.

At his war crimes trial, Knöchlein claimed that he was tortured, which Scotland dismisses in London Cage as a "lame allegation". According to Knöchlein, he was stripped, deprived of sleep, kicked by guards and starved. He said that he was compelled to walk in a tight circle for four hours. After complaining to Alexander Scotland, Knöchlein alleges that he was doused in cold water, pushed down stairs, and beaten. He claimed he was forced to stand beside a hot gas stove before being showered with cold water. He claimed that he and another prisoner were forced to run in circles while carrying heavy logs.

Knöchlein wrote,

Since these tortures were the consequences of my personal complaint, any further complaint would have been senseless. [...] One of the guards who had a somewhat humane feeling advised me not to make any more complaints, otherwise things would turn worse for me.

Other prisoners, he alleged, were beaten until they begged to be killed, while some were told that they could be made to disappear.

Scotland said in his memoirs that Knöchlein was not interrogated at all at the London Cage because there was sufficient evidence to convict him, and he wanted "no confusing documents with the aid of which he might try to wriggle from the net." During his last nights at the cage, Scotland states, Knöchlein,

began shrieking in a half-crazed fashion, so that the guards at the London Cage were at a loss to know how to control him. At one stage the local police called in to enquire why such a din was emanating from sedate Kensington Palace Gardens.

At a trial in 1947 of eighteen Germans accused in the massacre of fifty Allied prisoners who escaped from Stalag Luft III, the Germans alleged starvation, sleep deprival, "third degree" interrogation methods, and torture by electric shock. Scotland describes these in his memoir as,

fantastic allegations [... .] At more than one stage in those fifty days of courtroom wrangling, a stranger to such peculiar affairs might have suspected that the arch-criminal of them all was a British Army intelligence officer known as Colonel Alexander Scotland.

Scotland denied the allegations at the trial. In London Cage he says he was,

greatly troubled [...] by the constant focus on our supposed shortcomings at The Cage, for it seemed to me that these manufactured tales of cruelty toward our German prisoners were fast becoming the chief item of news, while the brutal fate of those fifty RAF officers was in danger of becoming old history.

== See also ==
- Combined Services Detailed Interrogation Centre
- Bad Nenndorf interrogation centre
- Camp 020
- Trent Park § Second World War – the "Cockfosters Cage"
