= History of wartime sexual violence =

Sexual violence has accompanied warfare in virtually every known historical era.

Women's historian Gerda Lerner writes that:

The practice of raping the women of a conquered group has remained a feature of warfare and conquest from the second millennium B.C. to the present. It is a social practice which, like the torture of prisoners, has been resistant to "progress", to humanitarian reforms, and to sophisticated moral and ethical considerations. I suggest this is the case because it is a practice built into and essential to the structure of patriarchal institutions and inseparable from them. It is at the beginning of the system, prior to class formation, that we can see this in its purest essence.

== Antiquity ==
In the Ancient Near East, wartime sexual violence and the pillaging of women were widespread practices often driven by a combination of strategic subjugation and personal gratification. While royal records often omitted these details to focus on grand military triumphs, legal codes and prophetic literature confirm that women were systematically treated as "spoils of war". Assyrian warfare often used intimidation in campaigns against foreign territories. When surrounding a capital city and demands of surrender proved futile, Assyrian forces resorted to attacking smaller nearby settlements, where buildings were burned and the inhabitants killed, mutilated, enslaved, or raped.

The Hebrew Bible contains several narratives and laws that acknowledge or regulate sexual violence in the context of conflict. In Numbers 31, the account of the war against the Midianites describes Moses ordering the execution of male captives and non-virgin women while sparing virgin girls for the Israelite soldiers a passage some scholars interpret as making sexual use of captives a normative practice in war. Other texts, such as Deuteronomy 21:10–14, establish specific regulations for taking a "beautiful woman" from among war captives as a wife; while some commentators view these as attempts to minimize brutality, modern critics argue they effectively endorse sexual slavery and genocidal rape.

The Greek and Roman armies reportedly engaged in war rape, which is documented by ancient authors such as Homer, Herodotus, Livy and Tacitus. Ancient sources held multiple, often contradictory attitudes to sexual violence in warfare. Haaretz writer and archaeologist Terry Madenholm explains that rape did not only serve as an instrument of sexual gratification or a tool for anger relief management.

For the Roman army, rape was more than just a weapon of terror; rape was regarded as the right of the victorious. It symbolized revenge, subjugation and the enslavement of the defeated. Polybius describes Roman soldiers carrying out conquest rape, while Livy portrays rape as synonymous with the capture of a city.

Women and children were not the only victims of ancient wars. Rape of adult men remains one of the most closely kept secrets possibly because it was incompatible with the notion of masculinity; being sexually submissive as a man was considered utterly unmanly, even for the ancient writers. In the Greco-Roman world a "true man" could play only an active role, and those who were submissive were stigmatized. Tacitus mentions Roman recruiting officers dragging off the most striking Batavian boys to non-consensual sex (rape), saying it was one of the causes of the Revolt of the Batavi.

According to medieval historians, the Avars—who invaded Eastern Europe during Late Antiquity—harassed Wendish women and kept them in bondage as sex slaves:

Each year, the Huns [Avars] came to the Slavs, to spend the winter with them; then they took the wives and daughters of the Slavs and slept with them, and among the other mistreatments [already mentioned] the Slavs were also forced to pay levies to the Huns. But the sons of the Huns, who were [then] raised with the wives and daughters of these Wends [Slavs] could not finally endure this oppression anymore and refused obedience to the Huns and began, as already mentioned, a rebellion.

— Chronicle of Fredegar, Book IV, Section 48, written circa 642

During Late Antiquity, India also saw countless invasions by warriors from Central Asia such as the Kushans, Hephthalites, and the Hunas. The Huna invasions of the Indian subcontinent helped hasten the decline of the Gupta Empire.

The Huna invaders conquered Kashmir, Punjab, and finally entered into the Ganges valley, in the very heart of India, slaughtering, pillaging, looting, burning, demolishing, and raping. Many cities in India were wiped out by the onslaught of the invaders; monasteries, temples, schools, and libraries were not spared, causing immense cultural destruction to the Indian subcontinent. Accounts are consistent that the Huna warriors practiced mass rapes of women in India.

== Middle Ages ==
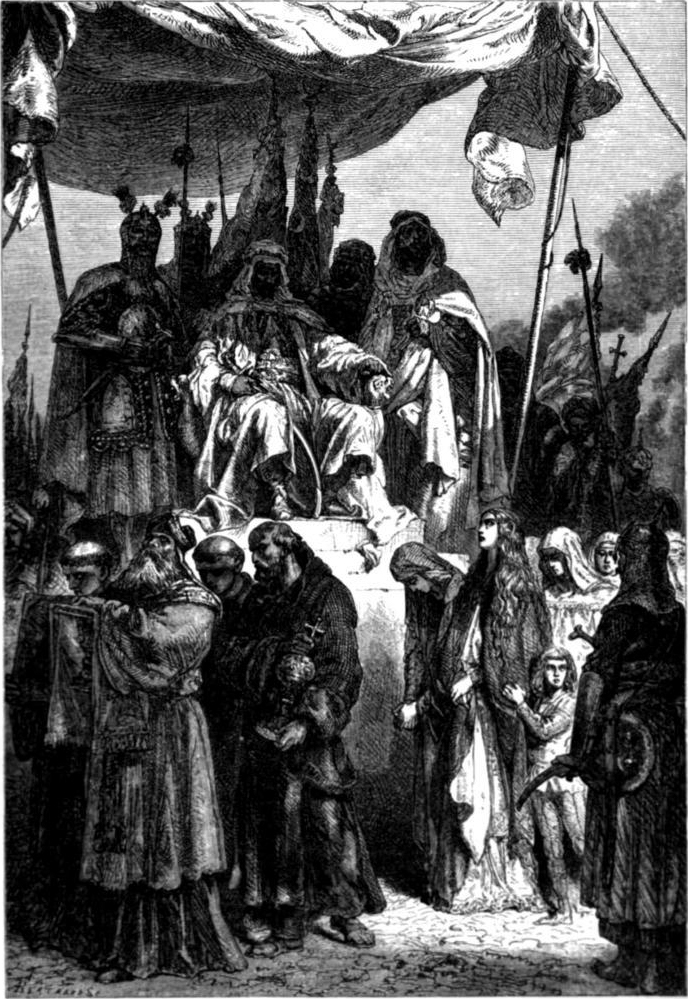
Christians before Saladin: many civilian inhabitants of Jerusalem were sold into sexual slavery after the Siege of Jerusalem (1187).

The Vikings were Scandinavians who raided and colonized wide areas of Europe from the late 8th century to the early 11th century. Viking settlements in Britain and Ireland are thought to have been primarily male enterprises, with a lesser role for female Vikings. British Isles' women are mentioned in old texts on the founding of Iceland, indicating that the Viking explorers had acquired wives and concubines from Britain and Ireland. The Vikings' "rape and pillage" image is disputed, and it may have arisen due to "exaggeration and distortion" in the Middle Ages.

Female slavery was common during the medieval Arab slave trade, where prisoners of war captured in battle as well as commercial slave trade from non-Arab lands sometimes ended up in sexual slavery as concubine slaves in the Arab world. Most of these slaves came from places such as Sub-Saharan Africa (mainly Zanj), the Caucasus (mainly Circassians), and Central Asia (mainly Tartars). A famous incident was the Siege of Jerusalem (1187), when Jerusalem was conquered by Muslim Ayyubid Sultanate of Egypt under Saladin. 15,000 of the Christian inhabitants of the city who could not pay the ransom were sold into slavery in the Ayyubid Sultanate. According to Imad ad-Din al-Isfahani, 7,000 of them were men and 8,000 were women and children. Contemporary Muslim sources describe the rape and enslavement in sexual slavery of non-Muslim women and girls after the fall of Jerusalem:

Women and children together came to 8,000 and were quickly divided up among us, bringing a smile to Muslim faces at their lamentations. How many well-guarded women were profaned and women who had been kept hidden stripped of their modesty, and virgins dishonoured and proud women deflowered, and lovey women's red lips kissed, and happy ones made to weep. How many noblemen took them as concubines, how many ardent men blazed for one of them, and celibates were satisfied by them, and thirsty men sated by them and turbulent men able to give vent to their passion.

— — Translation of the account of Saladin's secretary Imad al-Din of the treatment of female captives following the siege of Jerusalem

Before the Jurchens overthrew the Khitan, married Jurchen women and Jurchen girls were raped by Liao Khitan envoys as a custom which caused resentment by the Jurchens against the Khitan. Song Dynasty princesses committed suicide to avoid rape or were killed for resisting rape by the Jin.

The Mongols, who established the Mongol Empire across much of Eurasia, caused much destruction during their invasions. Documents written during or after Genghis Khan's reign say that after a conquest, the Mongol soldiers looted, pillaged and raped. Some troops who submitted were incorporated into the Mongol system in order to expand their manpower. These techniques were sometimes used to spread terror and warning to others.

The Mongols invaded Hungary (Pannonia) and penetrated Austria almost to Vienna in 1241–1242. To the south of Vienna, they reached the Austrian town of Wiener Neustadt and devastated the countryside around the town, where, according to Frenchman Ivo of Narbonne, they tortured and ate Austrian civilians before the Mongols eventually retreated to Hungary.

Similar accounts of Ivo of Narbonne's description of Mongol rape and cannibalism appear in Chronica Majora by Matthew Paris. However, some modern historians have suggested that medieval European sources often rhetorically depict the Mongols and other steppe peoples using barbaric tropes, which may exaggerate or misrepresent accounts of practices such as cannibalism.

Rogerius of Apulia's account of devastation and slaughter the Mongols wrought upon Europeans during the Mongol invasion of Hungary and Transylvania is in his book Carmen Miserabile.

In 1302, the army of Mamluk Sultan Al-Nasir Muhammad, who was of Kipchak Turkic descent, crushed a Bedouin rebellion in Upper Egypt and "slew mercilessly every Bedouin in the land and carried off their women captive". G. W. Murray said that "This drastic solution of the Bedouin question removed the pure Arab descendants of the Conquerors from the scene and so enabled the Beja to preserve themselves as an African race practically uninfluenced by Arab blood, while leaving the desert edges of Upper Egypt free for settlement by the Western Bedouin." The army was led by the Oirat Mongol Mamluk Sayf ad-Din Salar and Circassian Mamluk al-Baibars al-Jashnakir (Beibars).

During Timur's invasion of Syria, in the sack of Aleppo (1400), Ibn Taghribirdi wrote that Timur's Tatar soldiers committed mass rape on the native women of Aleppo, massacring their children and forcing the brothers and fathers of the women to watch the gang rapes which took place in the mosques. Ibn Taghribirdi said the Tatars killed all children while tying the women with ropes in Aleppo's Great mosque after the children and women tried to take refuge in the mosque. Tatar soldiers openly raped gentlewomen and virgins in public in both the small mosques and the Great Mosque. The brothers and fathers of the women were being tortured and mutilated while forced to watch their female relatives get raped. The corpses in the streets and mosques resulted in stink permeating Aleppo. The women were kept naked while being gang raped repeatedly by different men. Ibn Arabshah witnessed the slaughters and rapes Timur's Tatar soldiers carried out. Mass rapes were also recorded in Timur's 1401 Sack of Damascus.

The fall of Constantinople in 1453 was a scene of mass atrocities in form of rape, followed by enslavement of women, girls and young boys in sexual slavery, and contemporary witnesses describe the pillage committed by the troops of the Muslim Ottoman army of Sultan Mehmet II. Contemporary witness reported how the marauding Ottoman soldiers raped and captured civilians inside the Hagia Sophia cathedral itself, where they:

"trussed up... maidens whom the sun had not looked upon, maidens whom even their fathers had scarcely seen, and dragged away; and if they tried to resist, they were driven onward with blows. Each rapacious Turk was eager to lead his captive to a safe place, and then return to secure a second and a third prize. The plunderers, the avengers sent by God, worked with force and speed, and in one hour everyone there had been tied up, ... women with their headcloths. Then long chains of captives could be seen leaving the church and its shrines, being herded along like cattle or flocks of sheep, weeping and wailing, with no one to show pity for them."

Women and girls were taken captive and dragged to the soldier's camps: "Many of the lovelier maidens... were almost torn to death as their captors quarreled over them. Soon a long procession of ill-assorted little groups of... women bound tightly together was being dragged to the soldiers' bivouacs, there to be fought over once again." In accordance with Islamic law around slavery in Islam, the non-Muslim war captives could be sold on the slave market to a life of sexual slavery in the form of concubinage in Islam, and according to Nicolas de Nicolay, slaves were displayed naked at the city's slave market, and young girls could be purchased.

== Early modern period ==
=== Ottoman expansion into Christian lands ===
In the Ottoman Empire, the practice of taking Christian captives as slaves, including as sex slaves (concubinage in Islam), was a notable aspect of the empire's expansionist and military activities, particularly in the Balkans and Eastern Europe, since by Islamic law on war prisoners, it was halal (legitimate) to enslave kafir (non-Muslim) from dar al-Harb (non-Muslim lands) in war with dar al-Islam (the Muslim world).

There are many testimonies that rape often preceded the enslavement of non-Muslim women by the Ottomans. During the fall of Constantinople in 1453, George Sphrantzes says that people were raped inside Hagia Sophia. Critobulus described the enslavement and sexual abuse committed by the Ottoman troops inside the Hagia Sophia:

Among all those outrages the profanation of Saint Sophia stood out. In the great church an immense crowd was assembled, prauing despairingly. The famous bronze door had been closed, and full of anguish all awaited the conquerors all waited the conquerors. Suddenly violent blows shoock and broke down the doors and a tide of blood-covered brutes swept in to the holy place. To make rooms for them they begun by using the pikes and scimitar a little; but they were in the grip of covetouness not sadism. Here, they said to themselves as they looked about, fortune awaits us. In an instant, all who were young, good-looking and healthy were stripped, despoiled and herded. High-born women, young and gentle girls of noble family, now naked under their long hair, fell thus into slavery. Their masters bound them with whatever was at hand: sashes, belts, kerchiefs, stoles, tent ropes, camel and horse reins. With blows and kicks they were herded outside into long columns, to be led to a shameful fate and to all the extremities of the Islamic world.

The elder refugees in the Hagia Sophia were slaughtered and the women raped.

During the Siege of Vienna in 1529, the Ottoman troops pillaged the countryside around Vienna and took many surviving civilians as slaves. Peter Stern von Labach described it:

After the taking of Bruck on the Leitha and the castle of Trautmannsdorf, the Sackman and those who went before him, people who have no regular pay, but live by plunder and spoil, to the number of 40,000, spread themselves far and wide over the country, as far as the Ens and into Styria, burning and slaying. Many thousands of people were murdered, or maltreated and dragged into slavery. Children were cut out of their mothers' wombs and stuck on pikes; young women abused to death, and their corpses left on the highway. God rest their souls, and grant vengeance on the bloodhounds who committed this evil.

Approximately 20,000 people are estimated to have been captured and kidnapped in to slavery, of which few ever returned: the Ottomans reportedly preferred young boys and girls and members of the clergy.

The Ottoman dynasty, as was the custom in many Islamic dynasties, used female slaves for the reproduction of heirs, and the sultans therefore routinely acknowledged paternity of the sons of their slave concubines, which resulted in the concubines becoming manumitted via the umm walad principle upon the death of their enslaver and could gain significant influence within the imperial court when their sons succeeded to the throne, although their initial capture and enslavement were marked by coercion and violence.

The practice contributed to the demographic and cultural changes in the Ottoman Empire, as many of these enslaved women converted to Islam and their offspring became integrated into Ottoman society.

=== Conquest of the Americas ===
During the Spanish conquest and subsequent colonisation of the Americas, sexual violence against Indigenous women was documented as a frequent occurrence. Early accounts from the Caribbean, including journals from the expeditions of Christopher Columbus, describe the commodification and rape of Taíno women, who were distributed among the crew or sold. In his own writings, Columbus noted the profitability of this trade, stating that "a hundred castellanos are as easily obtained for a woman as for a farm" and observing that there was a high demand for girls aged nine to ten.

In the regions of Mexico and Peru, the overthrow of the Aztec and Inca Empires involved systemic violence that included the widespread rape of Indigenous women. Records from the Spanish mission system in California and the Southwest further document sexual violence. Franciscan missionaries, including Junípero Serra and Luis Jayme, wrote letters to colonial authorities detailing the conduct of Spanish soldiers stationed at presidios. These reports described soldiers forcibly seizing Kumeyaay and other Indigenous women for sexual purposes, Jayme reported that soldiers at every mission had "scandalized all the Gentiles" through "continuous abuses," specifically noting the frequent rape of young native girls. Despite official prohibitions by the Spanish Crown and the Catholic Church against the mistreatment of "neophytes," enforcement was often ineffective due to the remote nature of the frontier and the dependence of the missions on military protection.

=== Sack of Rome ===
During the Sack of Rome in 1527, troops of the Holy Roman Emperor Charles V committed extensive sexual violence against the city's inhabitants. The soldiers, primarily Spanish and German mercenaries, engaged in widespread rape and sexual abuse of women.

=== Eighty Years' War ===
During the second half of the Eighty Years' War, Brabantian towns such as Helmond, Eindhoven and Oisterwijk were repeatedly subjected to pillaging, arson, and rape committed by both the rebel Dutch States Army and the royal Spanish Army of Flanders.

=== Münster rebellion ===
Some women were gang-raped by the Bishop's soldiers during the defeat of the Anabaptist Münster rebellion in 1535.

=== Thirty Years' War ===
During the Sack of Magdeburg, many Imperial soldiers supposedly went out of control. The invading soldiers had not received payment for their service and demanded valuables from every household they encountered. There were reports of gang rapes of minors and torture.

=== Wars of the Three Kingdoms ===
A significant number of women were gang-raped by Royalist and Irish Confederate troops under General Montrose who sacked Aberdeen in Scotland in 1644.

=== Second Manchu invasion of Korea ===
In the Second Manchu invasion of Korea when Qing forces invaded the Korean Kingdom of Joseon, many Korean women were subjected to rape at the hands of the Qing forces, and as a result they were unwelcomed by their families even if they were released by the Qing after being ransomed.

=== Manchu invasion of Xinjiang ===
The Ush rebellion in 1765 by Uyghur Muslims against the Manchus of the Qing dynasty occurred after Uyghur women were gang raped by the servants and son of Manchu official Su-cheng. It was said that "Ush Muslims had long wanted to sleep on [Sucheng and son's] hides and eat their flesh" because of the rape of Uyghur Muslim women for months by the Manchu official Sucheng and his son. The Manchu Emperor ordered that the Uyghur rebel town be massacred, the Qing forces enslaved all the Uyghur children and women and slaughtered the Uyghur men. Manchu soldiers and Manchu officials regularly having sex with or raping Uyghur women caused massive hatred and anger by Uyghur Muslims to Manchu rule. The invasion by Jahangir Khoja was preceded by another Manchu official, Binjing, who raped a Muslim daughter of the Kokan aqsaqal from 1818 to 1820. The Qing sought to cover up the rape of Uyghur women by Manchus to prevent anger against their rule from spreading among the Uyghurs.

During the Revolt of the Altishahr Khojas, Manchu soldiers under Qing Manchu general Zhaohui stationed in a barracks in Karasu (Black water or Heishui 黑水 in Chinese) in Yarkand cooked and ate Uyghur Muslims after butchering them. If the Manchu soldiers caught a married Uyghur Muslim couple, the Manchus would eat the Uyghur man while gang raping the Uyghur woman and then cook and eat her after.

=== Dutch Formosa ===
Dutch colonial forces in Taiwan raided Liuqiu island in 1636 and 1642, enslaving the population. The women and children became servants and wives for the Dutch officers. Multiple Taiwanese aboriginal villages in frontier areas rebelled against the Dutch in the 1650s due to acts of oppression, such as when the Dutch ordered that aboriginal women be turned over to them for sex. During the 1662 Siege of Fort Zeelandia in which Chinese Ming loyalist forces commanded by Koxinga besieged and defeated the Dutch East India Company and conquered Taiwan, Dutch male prisoners were executed. Surviving women and children were enslaved, and a number of them were sold to Chinese soldiers to become their wives or concubines. A teenage daughter of the Dutch missionary Antonius Hambroek became a concubine to Koxinga.

Memory of the fate of the women and of Hambroek's daughter has been kept alive through the subsequent historiography of the period, whence it has stoked various dramatised and fictionalised retellings of the story.

=== Russian invasion of the Amur ===
Cattle and horses in the hundreds were looted and 243 ethnic Daur Mongolic girls and women were raped by Russian Cossacks under Yerofey Khabarov when he invaded the Amur river basin in the 1650s. The Albazinians were told to marry Solon Evenki widows by the Board of Rites. Mongol and Manchu women were married by the Albazinians. The wives married by the Albazinians were former jailed convicts.

=== American Revolutionary War ===
British soldiers and German mercenaries accompanying them raped American women and girls during the American Revolutionary War. Eyewitness testimonies and contemporary newspapers reported multiple instances of rape committed by British and German soldiers, often alongside other atrocities such as looting and the destruction of property. A Continental Army colonel described British rampages as involving "murder, rape, rapine, and violence." In 1776, The Pennsylvania Evening Post detailed the rapes of girls as young as ten and thirteen by British soldiers and reported women being taken to British camps for "sexual purposes".

=== Four Days of Ghent ===
During the Four Days of Ghent (13–16 November 1789), part of the Brabant Revolution, Patriot rebels tried to capture the city of Ghent from a weak Imperial Army garrison, which sought to retain the Austrian Netherlands for the Habsburg Monarchy. After the first day of fighting was over, and the night fell, plundering started. Primarily the Imperial troops, most notably the "Clerfayt" Regiment, badly misbehaved by robbing, raping and killing. Both Imperial and Patriot sources report an astonishing lack of discipline amongst the Imperial soldiers, and that their crimes committed against civilians at the early stages of combat was a crucial factor in motivating the civilian population of Ghent to side with the rebels.

== Modern period before World War I ==
=== Ottoman-Saudi War ===
The historian Abd al-Rahman al-Jabarti recorded in his history, The Marvelous Compositions of Biographies and Events (‘Aja’ib al-athar fi’l-tarajim wa’l-akhbar), that Ottoman forces in the Ottoman-Saudi War took Wahhabi Saudi women and girls as slaves, despite them being Muslim and enslavement of Muslims being illegal. The jihadist Islamist Saudi Nasir al-Fahd mentioned the Ottoman enslavement of Saudi women and girls in his book attacking the Ottomans, The Ottoman State and the Position of the Call of Sheikh Muhammad ibn Abd al-Wahhab on it, published in 1993.

=== Circassian genocide ===
Cossacks raped Muslim Circassian women.

Russians raped Circassian girls during the 1877 Russo-Turkish war from the Circassian refugees who were settled in the Ottoman Balkans.

=== Indian Rebellion of 1857 ===
During the Indian Rebellion of 1857, known as "India's First War of Independence" to the Indians and as the "Sepoy Mutiny" to the British, Indian sepoys rebelled en masse against the East India Company's rule over India. Incidents of rape committed by Indian sepoys against British women and children were reported in the English press, particularly after British civilians fell into Indian hands after sieges such as at Cawnpore. However, after the rebellion was suppressed, detailed analyses by the British government concluded that although Indian sepoys had engaged in massacres of British civilians after they captured them, there had never been one single instance of war rape committed by the sepoys. One such account published by The Times, regarding an incident where 48 British girls as young as fourteen and ten had been raped by the Indian sepoys in Delhi, was criticised as an obvious fabrication by Karl Marx, who pointed out that the story was written by a clergyman in Bangalore, while the rebellion was mostly confined to the Punjab region.

As British troops suppressed the rebellion, angered by reports of massacres and rapes of British civilians, reprisals were often carried out against Indian civilians, particularly at Cawnpore. Indian women were often a target of rape by the enraged soldiers.

=== Boxer Rebellion ===
During the Boxer Rebellion, the Yihetuan committed several massacres of foreign civilians (motivated by their anti-Christian and anti-Western sentiment) but were said to avoid raping women.

The majority population of the hundreds of thousands of people living in the inner "Tartar" city of Beijing during the Qing were Manchus and Mongol bannermen from the Eight Banners after they were moved there in 1644. During the Boxer Rebellion in 1900, western and Japanese soldiers mass raped Manchu women and Mongol banner women.

Indeed, it appeared common practise for the invading soldiers to capture women, regardless of class or creed, to rape them. This was done by forcing them to work as sex slaves in rape-manors they had established in the Beijing hutongs (alleys formed by siheyuan residences). This excerpt from the "Miscellaneous Notes about the Boxers", written by Japanese journalist Sawara Tokusuke, describes one such rape-manor:

The Allied forces would frequently capture women, no matter virtuous, wretched, old or young, and would, as much as they could, displace them to Biaobei alleys and to live in row houses there as prostitutes for the soldiery. The West end of this alley the path would have been blocked off, in order to prevent escape, the East end was the only way in or out. This way was guarded. Any person from the Allied forces could enter for pleasure and rape to his heart's desire.

— Sawara 268

Sawara also reports on the seven daughters of the Manchu bannerman Yulu 裕禄 of the Hitara clan, the Viceroy of the province of Zhili (present day Hebei). Yulu was on good terms with the invaders. He was a man who always sought to create good impressions, and due to this, the British Consul at Tianjin offered him asylum on board of one of Her Majesty's ships for his loyalty to the British (Fleming 84). Later in the war Yulu perished in the battle for Yangcun. When Beijing fell, the Allies abducted all seven of his daughters and then sent them to the Heavenly Palace in Beijing where they were violated repeatedly. Then they were held captive as sex slaves for the soldiers in one of the rape-manors mentioned above (Sawara 268).

Another story relays the fate that befell the women of Chongqi's household. Chongqi 崇绮 was a nobleman from the Mongolian Alute clan and scholar of high standing in the Imperial Manchu court. He was also the father-in-law of the previous Emperor. His wife and one of his daughters, much like Yulu's daughters, were captured by the invading soldiers. They were taken to the Heavenly Temple, held captive and were then brutally raped by dozens of Eight Nations Alliance soldiers during the entire course of the Beijing occupation. Only after the Eight Nations Alliance's retreat did the mother and daughter return home, only to hang themselves from the rafters. Upon this discovery, Chongqi, out of despair, soon followed suit (Sawara 266). He hanged himself on 26 August 1900. His son, Baochu, and many other family members committed suicide shortly after (Fang 75).

Many Manchu bannermen in Beijing supported the Boxers in the Boxer Rebellion and shared their anti-foreign sentiment. The Manchu bannermen were devastated by the fighting during the First Sino-Japanese War and the Boxer Rebellion, sustaining massive casualties during the wars and subsequently being driven into extreme suffering and hardship. The forces of the Eight-Nation Alliance, upon their capture of Beijing, went on violent rampages against Manchu civilians, looting, raping, and murdering numerous civilians they came across. The number of women who committed suicide numbered in the thousands. A western Journalist, George Lynch, said "there are things that I must not write, and that may not be printed in Great Britain, which would seem to show that this Western civilization of ours is merely a veneer over savagery." All of the eight nations in the alliance engaged in looting and war rape. Luella Miner wrote that the behavior of the Russians and French was particularly appalling. Qing women and girls killed themselves in order to avoid being raped. The French commander dismissed the rapes, attributing them to the "gallantry of the French soldiers".

Manchu property including horses and cattle were looted while their villages were burnt by the Russian Cossacks as Manchus were driven out as refugees and slaughtered by Russian cossacks according to S. M. Shirokogoroff when he was in Heilongjiang along the Amur river garrison of Heihe (Aihun). Manchu banner garrisons were annihilated on 5 roads by Russians as they suffered most of the casualties. Manchu Shoufu killed himself during the battle of Peking and the Manchu Lao She's father was killed by western soldiers in the battle as the Manchu banner armies of the Center Division of the Guards Army, Tiger Spirit Division and Peking Field force in the Metropolitan banners were slaughtered by the western soldiers. Baron von Ketteler, the German diplomat was murdered by Captain Enhai, a Manchu from the Tiger Spirit Division of Aisin Gioro Zaiyi, Prince Duan and the Inner city Legation Quarters and Catholic cathedral were both attacked by Manchu bannermen. Manchu bannermen were slaughtered by the Eight Nation Alliance all over Manchuria and Beijing because most of the Manchu bannermen supported the Boxers in the Boxer rebellion. The clan system of the Manchus in Aigun was obliterated by the despoliation of the area at the hands of the Russian invaders.

=== Russo-Japanese war ===
It was reported in 1905 that many Russian women were raped by Japanese troops causing widespread venereal disease in many Japanese troops after the Russo-Japanese War.

=== German South-West Africa ===
In German South-West Africa during the Herero rebellion against German rule (and the subsequent Herero and Namaqua Genocide), German soldiers regularly engaged in gang rapes before killing the women or leaving them in the desert to die; a number of Herero women were also violently forced into involuntary prostitution.

=== Xinhai revolution ===
In October 1911, during the Xinhai revolution, revolutionaries stormed the Manchu quarter of Xi'an. Most of the city's 20,000 Manchus were killed. The Hui Muslim community was divided in its support for the revolution. The Hui Muslims of Shaanxi supported the revolutionaries, while the Hui Muslims of Gansu supported the Qing. The native Hui Muslims (Mohammedans) of Xi'an (Shaanxi province) joined the Han Chinese revolutionaries in slaughtering the Manchus. Some wealthy Manchus survived by being ransomed. Wealthy Han Chinese enslaved Manchu girls and poor Han Chinese troops seized young Manchu women as wives. Hui Muslims also seized young Manchu girls and raised them as Muslims.

A British missionary who witnessed the massacre commented that "Old and young, men and women, children alike, were all butchered ... Houses were plundered and then burnt; those who would fain have laid hidden till the storm was past, were forced to come out into the open. The revolutionaries, protected by a parapet of the wall, poured a heavy, unceasing, relentless fire into the doomed Tartar (Manchu) city, those who tried to escape thence into the Chinese city were cut down as they emerged from the gates."

== World War I ==
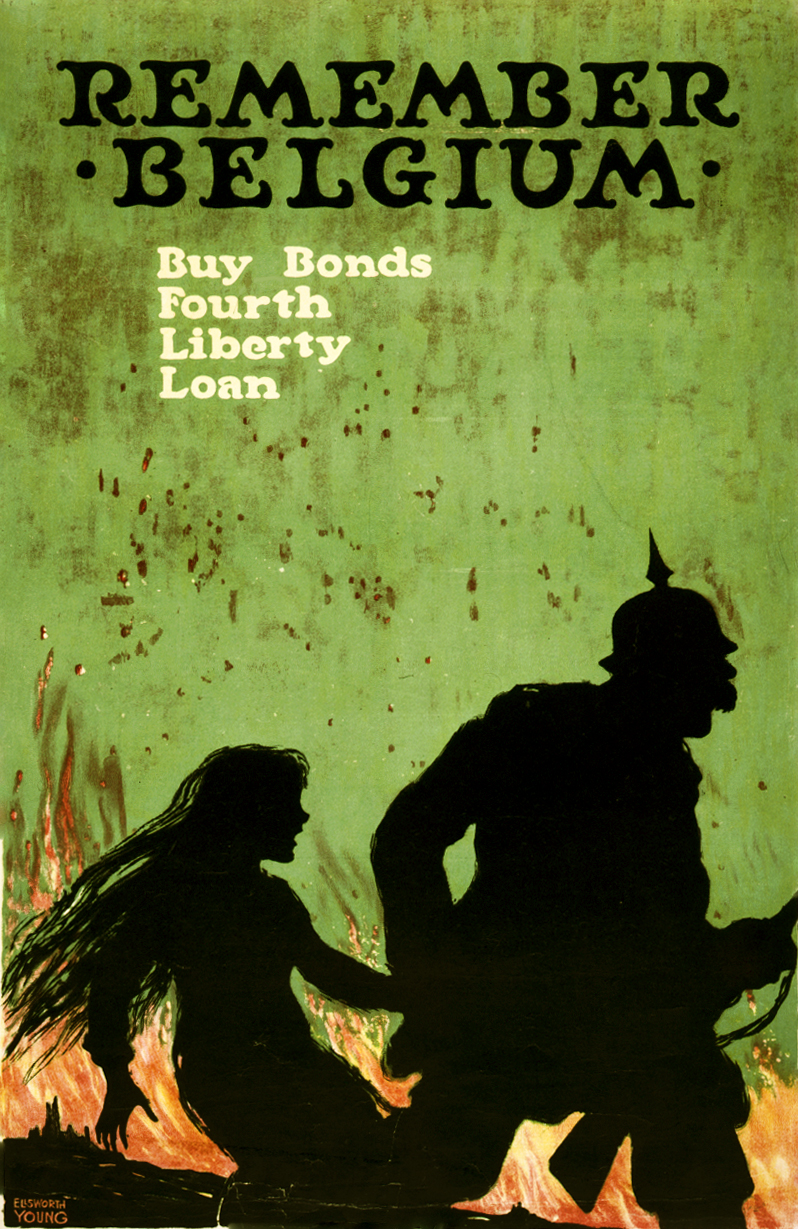
"Remember Belgium", an American propaganda poster printed during World War I, depicting the fate of Belgium. The rape of the young girl representing Belgium is implied.

Rapes were allegedly committed during the German advance through Belgium in the first months of the war. After the war, the historian Harold D. Lasswell dismissed the rape allegations as propaganda in his 1927 Freudian-oriented study, "Propaganda Technique in the World War". In September 1914, the French government set up a commission, that was also seen in Belgium to investigate reports of rape committed by German soldiers, however as historian Ruth Harris has documented the investigations were more to fuel narratives of nationalism and cultural hatred towards Germany. The individual stories of the women that were impacted were used to justify the war and to market it to the civilians.

=== Bavarian Soviet Republic ===
Manfred Freiherr von Killinger related how, during the defeat of the Bavarian Soviet Republic, he ordered a female Communist sympathizer to be whipped "until there was not a white spot left on her backside".

=== Armenian genocide ===
Rape was widespread during the Armenian genocide, which was committed by the Ottoman Turks. During the death marches of Armenian civilians through Anatolia in 1915, Turkish soldiers frequently raped and killed Armenian women and children. In many cases, Turkish civilians also participated in these crimes.

Although Armenian women attempted to evade sexual violence, suicide was frequently their only recourse. Women were displayed naked in Damascus, and were trafficked as sex slaves, serving as a significant revenue for accompanying soldiers.

== World War II ==
The sometimes widespread and systematic occurrence of war rape of enemy and allied civilians by soldiers has been documented. During World War II and in its immediate aftermath, war rape occurred in a range of situations, ranging from institutionalized sexual slavery to war rapes associated with specific battles.

=== Asia ===
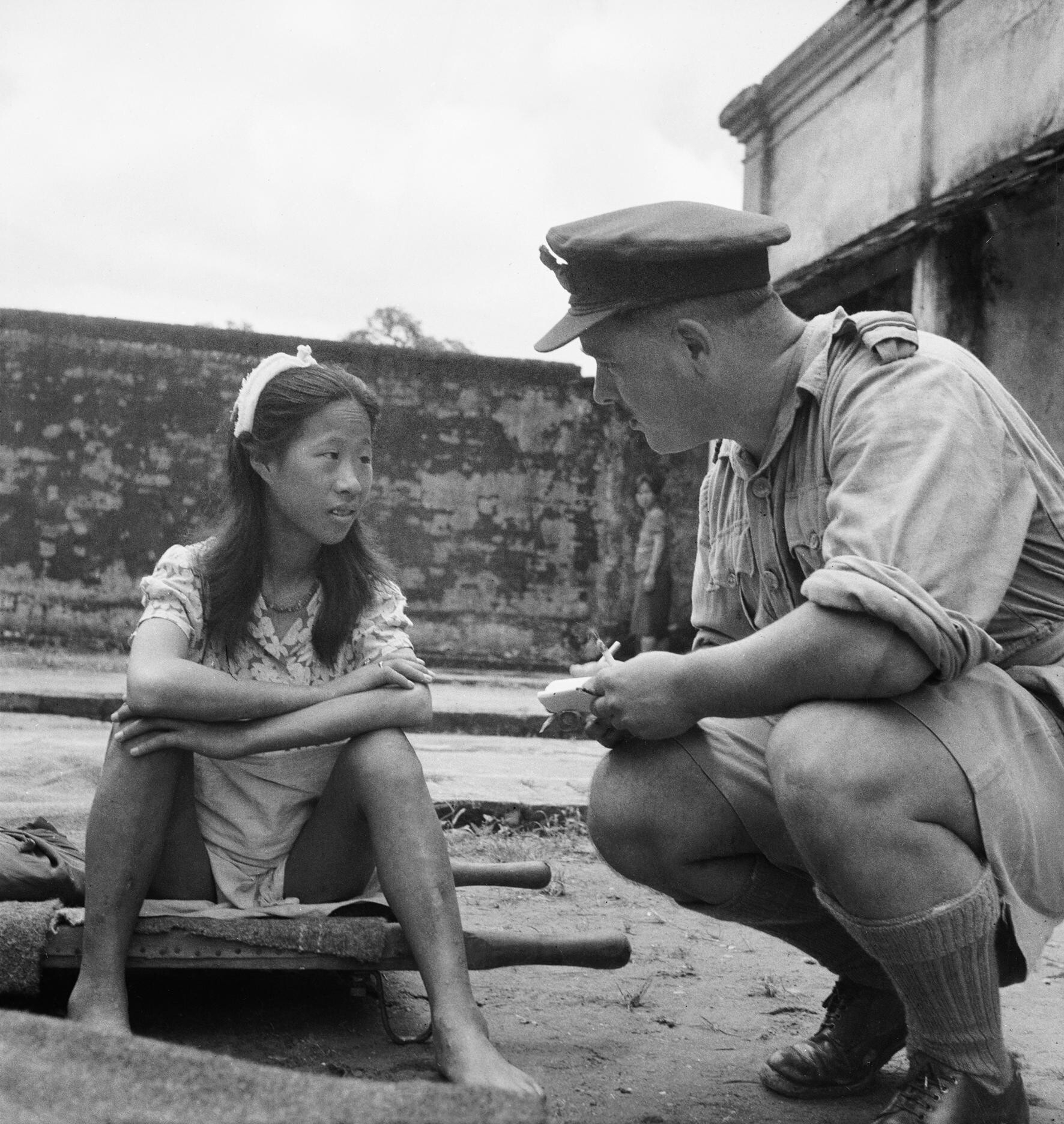
Rangoon, Burma. 8 August 1945. A young ethnic Chinese woman from one of the Imperial Japanese Army's "comfort battalions" is interviewed by an Allied officer.

==== Imperial Japanese Army ====
The term "comfort women" is a euphemism for the estimated 200,000, mostly Korean, Chinese, Vietnamese, Burmese, Japanese, Taiwanese and Filipino women who were forced to serve as sex slaves in Japanese military brothels during World War II.

Chuo University professor Yoshiaki Yoshimi states there were about 2,000 centers where as many as 200,000 Japanese, Chinese, Korean, Filipino, Taiwanese, Burmese, Indonesian, Timorese, Papuan, Micronesian, Dutch and Australian women were interned and used as sex slaves. There were comfort women stations in China, Hong Kong, Taiwan, Japan, North and South Korea, Malaysia, Indonesia, Philippines, Burma, Thailand, Cambodia, Vietnam, New Guinea, the Kurile Islands, and Sakhalin.

In the Nanjing Massacre, Japanese soldiers sexually assaulted Chinese women who were trapped in the city of Nanjing when it fell to the Japanese on 13 December 1937. The International Military Tribunal for the Far East estimated that 20,000 women and children were raped or otherwise sexually assaulted during the first month of the occupation. Iris Chang estimated that the number of Chinese women raped by Japanese soldiers ranged from 20,000 to 80,000.

The Japanese forced Vietnamese women to become comfort women—and, with Burmese, Indonesian, Thai and Filipino women—they made up a notable portion of Asian comfort women in general. Japanese use of Malaysian and Vietnamese women as comfort women was corroborated by many different testimonies.

In Java, the Japanese heavily recruited Javanese girls as comfort women and brought them to New Guinea, Malaysia, Thailand and other areas foreign to Indonesia besides using them in Java itself. When recruiting these girls, the Japanese would lie to the Javanese telling them that their girls would become waitresses and actresses. The Japanese destroyed many documents related to their rape of Indonesian Javanese girls at the end of the war, so the true extent of the mass rape is uncountable, but testimony witnesses records the names and accounts of Indonesian Javanese comfort women.

In one instance, the Japanese tried to disguise the Javanese comfort girls they were raping as red cross nurses with red cross armbands when they surrendered to Australian soldiers in Kupang, Timor.

In Bali, the Japanese sexually harassed Balinese women when they arrived and started forcing Balinese women into brothels for prostitution, with Balinese men and Chinese men used as recruiters for the Balinese women. All of the brothels in Bali were staffed by Balinese women.

Melanesian women from New Guinea were also used as comfort women. Local women were recruited from Rabaul as comfort women, along with a small number of mixed Japanese-Papuan women born to Japanese fathers and Papuan mothers. Around 100 Micronesian women from island of Truk in the Carolines were also used as comfort women.

An unknown number of white females and children were either raped or sexually assaulted at various locations such as Banoeng, Padang, Tarakan, Menado, Flores island and Blora, at the beginning of the Japanese initial invasion and occupation. In the Bangka Island, most of the Australian nurses captured were raped before they were murdered.

J. F. van Wagtendonk and the Dutch Broadcast Foundation estimated a total of 400 Dutch girls were taken from the camps to become comfort women. Japanese soldiers raped Indonesian women and Dutch women in the Netherlands East Indies. Many of the women were infected with STDs as a result.

Suharto silenced public discussion in Indonesian on Japanese war crimes in Indonesia in order to stop anti-Japanese sentiment building up but it happened regardless when the movie Romusha came out in 1973 and the Peristiwa Malari (Malari affair) riots broke out in Indonesia in 1974 against Japan. Suharto also sought to silence discussion on Japanese war crimes due to Indonesia's own war crimes in East Timor after 1975, but Indonesians started talking about Indonesian comfort women in the 1990s following the example of Korea. Mardyiem, a Javanese Indonesian comfort woman talked about what happened to her after Indonesian comfort women were interviewed by Japanese lawyers, after decades of being forced to stay silent.

Three major revolts happened against Japan by Indonesians in Java. Japanese forced Indonesians of West Java in Cirebon to hand over a massive quota of rice to the Japanese military with Japanese officers using brutality to extract even more than the official quota. The Indonesians in Cirebon rebelled twice and targeted Indonesian collaborator bureaucrats and Japanese officers in 1944. Japan killed a lot of Indonesian rebels while crushing them with deadly force. In Sukmana, Singapurna, the Tasikmalaya regency, the conservative religious teacher Kiai Zainal Mustafa told his followers that in the month when Muhammad was born they would gain divine protection when he gave a sign. In February 1943, Japanese Kempeitai caught wind of what was happening and came to the area but the roads were blocked to stop them. The Indonesian villagers and students began to fight the Japanese and seized the sabre of the Japanese chief to kill him. More Japanese arrived and 86 Japanese and 153 Indonesian villagers died in the fighting. The Japanese then arrested Zainal and 22 others for execution. Supriyadi lead a Peta mutiny against the Japanese in February 1945.

Japanese raped Malay comfort women, but UMNO leader Najib Razak blocked all attempts by other UMNO members like Mustapha Yakub at asking Japan for compensation and apologies. The threat of Japanese rape against Chitty girls led Chitty families to let Eurasians, Chinese and full-blooded Indians to marry Chitty girls and stop practicing endogamy.

Japanese soldiers raped Indian Tamil girls and women that were forced to work on the Burma railway. This led to Japanese soldiers contracting venereal disease such as chancroid, syphilis and gonorrhoea.

==== French Army ====
Vietnamese civilians were robbed, raped and killed by French soldiers in Saigon when they came back in August 1945. Vietnamese women were also raped in North Vietnam by the French like in Bảo Hà, Bảo Yên District, Lào Cai province, and Phu Lu, which caused 400 Vietnamese who were trained by the French to defect on 20 June 1948. Buddhist statues were looted and Vietnamese were robbed, raped and tortured by the French after the French crushed the Viet Minh in northern Vietnam in 194[?]–1948 forcing the Viet Minh to flee into Yunnan, China, for sanctuary and aid from the Chinese Communists. A French reporter was told by Vietnamese violate notables, "We know what war always is, We understand your soldiers taking our animals, our jewelry, our Buddhas; it is normal. We are resigned to their raping out wives and our daughters; war has always been like that. But we object to being treated in the same way, not only our sons, but ourselves, old men and dignitaries that we are." Vietnamese rape victims became "half insane".

==== Australian Army ====
A former prostitute recalled that as soon as Australian troops arrived in Kure in early 1946, they "dragged young women into their jeeps, took them to the mountain, and then raped them. I heard them screaming for help nearly every night".

==== United States Army ====
A large number of rapes were committed by U.S. forces during the Battle of Okinawa in 1945. The Judge Advocate General's office reports that there were 971 convictions for rape in the U.S. military from January 1942 to June 1947, which includes a portion of the occupation.

Okinawan historian Oshiro Masayasu (former director of the Okinawa Prefectural Historical Archives) writes:

Soon after the U.S. marines landed, all the women of a village on Motobu Peninsula fell into the hands of American soldiers. At the time, there were only women, children and old people in the village, as all the young men had been mobilized for the war. Soon after landing, the marines "mopped up" the entire village, but found no signs of Japanese forces. Taking advantage of the situation, they started "hunting for women" in broad daylight and those who were hiding in the village or nearby air raid shelters were dragged out one after another.

According to Toshiyuki Tanaka, 76 cases of rape or rape-murder were reported during the first five years of the American occupation of Okinawa. However, he asserts this is probably not the true figure, as most cases were unreported.

When the Japanese surrendered, they anticipated that widespread rapes would occur during the following occupation and made rapid efforts to set up brothels to curb this.

Despite this precaution, 1,336 rapes reportedly occurred during the first 10 days of the occupation of Kanagawa prefecture, although a similar figure has also been given for the whole of Japan.

Individual instances of rape by members of the United States Army in Japan were reported while their forces were stationed in post-war Japan, such as the Yumiko-chan incident and the 1995 Okinawa rape incident.

Some historians state that mass rapes took place during the initial phase of the occupation. For instance, Fujime Yuki has stated that 3,500 rapes occurred in the first month after American troops landed. Tanaka relates that in Yokohama, the capital of the prefecture, there were 119 known rapes in September 1945. At least seven academic books and many other works state that there were 1,336 reported rapes during the first 10 days of the occupation of Kanagawa Prefecture. Walsh states that this figure originated from Yuki Tanaka's book Hidden Horrors, and resulted from that author misreading the crime figures in their source. The source states that the Japanese Government recorded 1,326 criminal incidents of all types involving American forces, of which an unspecified number were rapes.

The Kokura incident (小倉黒人米兵集団脱走事件) was a mass rape event by mutinous American soldiers of the 24th Infantry Regiment (United States) against Japanese women in the city of Kokura in July 1950, after they rioted against deployment to Korea.

22 year old American soldier James L. Clark from Marks, Missouri killed 4 Japanese who belonged to a single family, two sons and their parents on 4 July 1950 in Kokura, leaving only Keiko, a 7-year-old girl to survive. James Clark's original death sentence was commuted and he was not executed.

On 11 July 1950 in Kokura, 75, 100, 200 or 250 soldiers of the US 24th Infantry Regiment which was at Camp Jōno and ordered to deploy into the Korean war rioted and escaped their camp and went on a raping spree in Kokura against Japanese women and killed a Japanese man. “Testimony revealed in the 1975 Fukuoka Prefectural edition of the Asahi suggests that some women were sexually assaulted in front of their husbands.” The mass rapes being committed by the US soldiers on Japanese women were mentioned in a US military police report to the Fukuoka Area Provost Marshal, chief of Kyushu Civil affairs region, on 17 July 1950.

US military censored all mention of the rapes in Japanese media.

A novel was written based on the events by a Japanese man from Kokura, Seichō Matsumoto. Duchess Harris wrote an essay “How negative stereotypes in material culture impact global politics”, criticising Matsumoto's novelisation for focusing on race in the incident, saying “The image of the Black GI as rapist has become something of a staple in Japanese pornography and films about the Occupation. The Black rapist trope also appears in Matsumoto Seicho’s short story, Kuroji no e.” Others also criticised his racial focus.

==== Soviet Army ====
During the Soviet invasion of Manchuria, Soviet and Mongolian soldiers attacked and raped Japanese civilians, often encouraged by the local Chinese population who were resentful of Japanese rule. The local Chinese population sometimes even joined in these attacks against the Japanese population with the Soviet soldiers. In one famous example, during the Gegenmiao massacre, Soviet soldiers and armed local Chinese rioters raped and massacred over one thousand Japanese women and children. Property of the Japanese were also looted by the Soviet soldiers and Chinese. Many Japanese women married themselves to local Manchurian men to protect themselves from persecution by Soviet soldiers. These Japanese women mostly married Chinese men and became known as "stranded war wives" (zanryu fujin).

According to British and American reports, Soviet Red Army troops also looted and terrorized the local people of Shenyang located in Manchuria. A foreigner witnessed Soviet troops, formerly stationed in Berlin, who were allowed by the Soviet military to go into the city of Shenyang "for three days of rape and pillage". The Soviet Army's reputation in the region was affected for years to come.

Konstantin Asmolov of the Center for Korean Research of the Russian Academy of Sciences dismisses Western accounts of Soviet violence against civilians in the Far East as exaggeration and rumor and contends that accusations of mass crimes by the Red Army inappropriately extrapolate isolated incidents regarding the nearly 2,000,000 Soviet troops in the Far East into mass crimes. According to him, such accusations are refuted by the documents of the time, from which it is clear that such crimes were far less of a problem than in Germany. Asmolov further asserts that the Soviets prosecuted their perpetrators while prosecution of German and Japanese "rapists and looters" in WWII was virtually unknown.

Japanese women in Manchukuo were repeatedly raped by Russian soldiers every day including underage girls from the families of Japanese who worked for the military and the Manchukuo rail at Beian airport and Japanese military nurses. The Russians seized Japanese civilian girls at Beian airport where there were a total of 1000 Japanese civilians, repeatedly raping 10 girls each day as recalled by Yoshida Reiko and repeatedly raped 75 Japanese nurses at the Sunwu military hospital in Manchukuo during the occupation. The Russians rejected all the pleading by the Japanese officers to stop the rapes. The Japanese were told by the Russians that they had to give their women for rape as war spoils.

Soviet soldiers raped Japanese women from a group of Japanese families that were with Yamada Tami that attempted to flee their settlements in 14 August and go to Mudanjiang. Another group of Japanese women that were with Ikeda Hiroko that on 15 August tried to flee to Harbin but returned to their settlements were raped by Soviet soldiers.

=== Europe ===
==== British Army ====
Italian statistics record eight rapes and nineteen attempted rapes by British service members in Italy between September 1943, when the invasion of Sicily occurred, and December 1945. In addition, British forces in Allied-occupied Germany committed rapes and other forms of sexual assault during the last months of World War II. Though a high priority for the Royal Military Police, some commanders proved reluctant to prosecute their men. There were also reports of sexual assaults committed by British soldiers in Belgium and the Netherlands after their liberation from German occupation, and a number of men were convicted of these crimes while fraternizing with Dutch and Belgian families during the winter of 1944–45.

==== Italian Army ====
During the Axis occupation of Greece, the Royal Italian Army committed numerous rapes and other forms of sexual assault against local Greek women. The 24th Infantry Division "Pinerolo" was among the Italian military units which committed rapes in Greece. Italian soldiers also committed rapes in Yugoslavia and France during World War II, and the Italian participation on the Eastern Front was marked by numerous instances of sexual exploitation and rape by Italian troops.

==== German Army ====
Rapes were committed by Wehrmacht forces on Jewish women and girls during the Invasion of Poland in September 1939; they were also committed against Polish, Ukrainian, Belarusian and Russian women and girls during mass executions which were primarily carried out by the Selbstschutz units, with the assistance of Wehrmacht soldiers who were stationed in territory that was under the administration of the German military; the rapes were committed against female captives before they were shot. Only one case of rape was prosecuted by a German court during the military campaign in Poland, and even then the German judge found the perpetrator guilty of Rassenschande (committing a shameful act against his race as defined by the racial policy of Nazi Germany), rather than rape. Jewish women were particularly vulnerable to rape during The Holocaust.

Rapes were also committed by German forces stationed on the Eastern Front, where they were largely unpunished; the overall number of rapes is difficult to establish due to the lack of prosecutions of the crime by German courts, however, it is estimated to have occurred on a very large scale. The Wehrmacht also established a system of military brothels, in which young women and girls from occupied territories were forced into prostitution under harsh conditions. Sexual violence against Soviet women by German soldiers was widespread on the Eastern Front. In some occupied localities, nearly all women were raped by German soldiers, and in several instances, entire military units participated in extreme acts of sexual violence. In early August 1941, the command of the German Ninth Army reported a notable increase in incidents of plundering and rape, even within the combat zone. In the Soviet Union women were kidnapped by German forces for prostitution as well; one report by the International Military Tribunal writes "in the city of Smolensk the German Command opened a brothel for officers in one of the hotels into which hundreds of women and girls were driven; they were mercilessly dragged down the street by their arms and hair."

German soldiers committed rapes in Yugoslavia. According to the State Commission for Investigation of Crimes Committed by the Occupation Forces and their Collaborators German soldiers committed 772 acts of rape during the Axis occupation of Serbia. During punitive operations on the Croatian island of Brač, German soldiers committed rapes alongside arson and massacres, as reprisals for casualties among their troops. Yugoslavian women were reportedly placed into brothels, and a 1941 document from the Osijek archives discussing plans for multiple brothels in Osijek, as well as the required sanitation procedures, has also been found.

Although on a smaller scale than on the Eastern Front, German soldiers also committed rape on the Western Front and in German-occupied countries in Western and Northern Europe. Reports of rape by German soldiers emerged from Czech, France, Denmark, the Netherlands, and Belgium.

In his book "Sex Crimes Under the Wehrmacht", author David Raub Snyder stated that a large number of Italian, French, and even German women were raped by Wehrmacht soldiers during the war. He argued that there is no evidence to suggest that non-Slavic women were spared from rape by German soldiers any more than Slavic women. He also noted that the lenient sentences imposed on German soldiers charged with rape were not unique to the Eastern Front, as many courts also handed down light punishments in cases involving the rape of non-Slavic women, including French, Italian, and German women.

During the German occupation of the British Channel Islands, some German soldiers were charged with rape.

According to professors of Regional State Archives in Hamar, following German invasion of Norway and during the German occupation of Norway, German soldiers committed numerous rapes against Norwegian women at gunpoint with impunity, while the local police ignored the reports of the rapes.

During the Distomo massacre, German soldiers engaged in mass rape, torture, and mutilation against local Greek women and girls in the village.

==== French Colonial Army ====
French Moroccan troops, known as Goumiers, committed rapes and other atrocities in Italy after the Battle of Monte Cassino and in Germany. In Italy, the mass rapes committed after the Battle of Monte Cassino by Goumiers, colonial troops of the French Expeditionary Corps, are known as Marocchinate. According to Italian sources, more than 7,000 Italian civilians, including women and children, were raped by Goumiers.

French Senegalese troops too, known as Senegalese Tirailleurs, who landed on the island of Elba on 17 June 1944, were responsible for mass rapes, though their behaviour was considered less brutal than that of the French North African troops in continental Italy.

==== US Army ====
Secret wartime files made public in 2006 revealed that American GIs committed at least 400 sexual offenses in Europe, including 126 rapes in the United Kingdom, between 1942 and 1945. A study by Robert J. Lilly estimates that at least a total of 14,000 civilian women in Britain, France and Germany were raped by American GIs during World War II. It is estimated that there were at least 3,500 rapes by American servicemen in France between June 1944 and the end of the war and one historian has claimed that sexual violence against women in liberated France was common. In the 2007 publication Taken by Force, sociology and criminology professor J. Robert Lilly estimates US soldiers raped at least 11,040 women and children during the occupation of Germany. Many armed soldiers committed gang rapes at gunpoint against female civilians and children.

==== Red Army ====
During the war, German, Polish, Romanian, Hungarian and Serbian women were victims of mass rapes committed against them by Soviet soldiers. Polish sources claim that mass rapes were committed in Polish cities that had been taken by the Red Army. It is reported that in Kraków, the Soviet occupation was accompanied by the mass rape of Polish women and girls, as well as the plunder of all private property by Soviet soldiers. Reportedly the scale of the attacks prompted communists installed by the Soviets to prepare a letter of protest to Joseph Stalin, while masses in churches were held in expectation of a Soviet withdrawal.

At the end of World War II, Red Army soldiers are estimated to have raped around 2,000,000 German women and girls. Norman Naimark, a historian and fellow at the conservative Hoover Institution, writes in The Russians in Germany: A History of the Soviet Zone of Occupation, 1945–1949 that although the exact number of women and girls who were raped by members of the Red Army in the months preceding the capitulation, and in the years following it, will never be known, their numbers are likely to be in the hundreds of thousands, quite possibly as high as the two million victims estimated by Barbara Johr, in Befreier und Befreite. Many of these victims were raped repeatedly.

Atina Grossman in her article in October describes how until early 1945, the abortions in Germany were illegal except for medical and eugenic reasons and so doctors opened up and started performing abortions to rape victims for which only an affidavit was requested from a woman. It was also typical that women specified their reasons for abortions as being mostly socio-economic (inability to raise another child), rather than moral or ethical.

A female Soviet war correspondent described what she had witnessed: "The Russian soldiers were raping every German female from eight to eighty. It was an army of rapists." The majority of the rapes were committed in the Soviet occupation zone and an estimated two million German women were raped by Soviet soldiers. According to historian William Hitchcock, in numerous cases women were victims of repeated rapes with some women being raped as many as 60 to 70 times. A minimum of 100,000 women are believed to have been raped in Berlin, based on surging abortion rates in the following months and on hospital reports written at the time, with an estimated 10,000 women dying in the aftermath. Female deaths resulting from rapes committed by Soviet soldiers stationed in Germany are estimated to total 240,000. Antony Beevor describes it as the "greatest phenomenon of mass rape in history", and he has concluded that at least 1.4 million women were raped in East Prussia, Pomerania and Silesia alone. According to Natalya Gesse, Soviet soldiers raped German females who were anywhere from eight to 80 years old. Liberated female Polish and Soviet Ostarbeiters were also raped.

Antony Beevor estimates that up to half of all rape victims were victims of gang rapes. Naimark states that not only did each victim have to carry the trauma with her for the rest of her days, it also inflicted a massive collective trauma on the East German nation. Naimark concludes "The social psychology of women and men in the Soviet zone of occupation was marked by the crime of rape from the first days of the occupation, through the founding of the GDR in the fall of 1949, until, one could argue, the present." Some 90% of raped Berlin women in 1945 contracted sexually transmitted infections, and 3.7% of all children born in Germany from 1945 to 1946 had Soviet fathers. The history of the Soviet rape of German women was considered a taboo subject until after the dissolution of the USSR and East Germany.

At the end of the war, Yugoslav communist leaders protested to Stalin about the large number of rapes committed by Soviet troops who had liberated parts of Yugoslavia. According to Milovan Djilas, Stalin replied, "Can't he [Djilas] understand it if a soldier who has crossed thousands of kilometres through blood and fire and death has fun with a woman or takes some trifle?"

Soviet soldiers raped up to 800,000 Hungarian women according to Fruzsina Skrabski who made a film about the rapes and many Hungarian women became infected with STDs and became pregnant from it. Soviet veterans admitted to Skrabski that they had sex with the Hungarian women but said it was consensual and not rape and that they received STDs from the women.

== Post-World War II ==
=== Korean War ===
During 11 months of 1952 in the 110,000-man logistics branch of Chinese Volunteer Army, there were 41 men charged with rapes. We Accuse! (Report of the Women's International Commission for the Investigation of War Atrocities in Korea) alleges several cases of rape by South Korean and US troops.

=== Algerian War ===
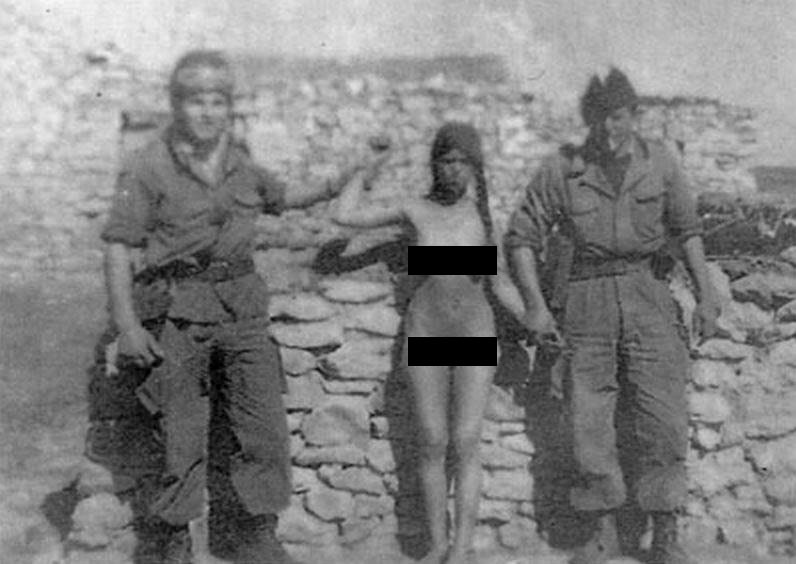
An Algerian woman sexually abused by the French army. French soldiers often took pictures of their victims to humiliate them further.

Sexual violence in the Algerian War was committed by the French Army against both FLN/ALN members and Algerian civilians. Victims included men, women, and even children. In contrast to torture, which has been extensively documented and studied by historians, sexual violence has remained for a long time a taboo subject, for both Algerian and French sides. It was not until the early 2000s that the subject was approached by historians and journalists. This effort has been limited by the scarcity of archives related to sexual violence, as well as the lack of testimonials of either the victims or the authors of crimes.

The Algerian National Liberation Front (FLN) was also known to have perpetrated sexual violence during the war.

=== Vietnam War ===
Rape during the Vietnam War included sexual violence and rapes directed against Vietnamese civilians by United States and South Korean troops. According to Sabine Cherenfant, "some children likely were conceived through consensual relationships" while "many children were conceived through rape".

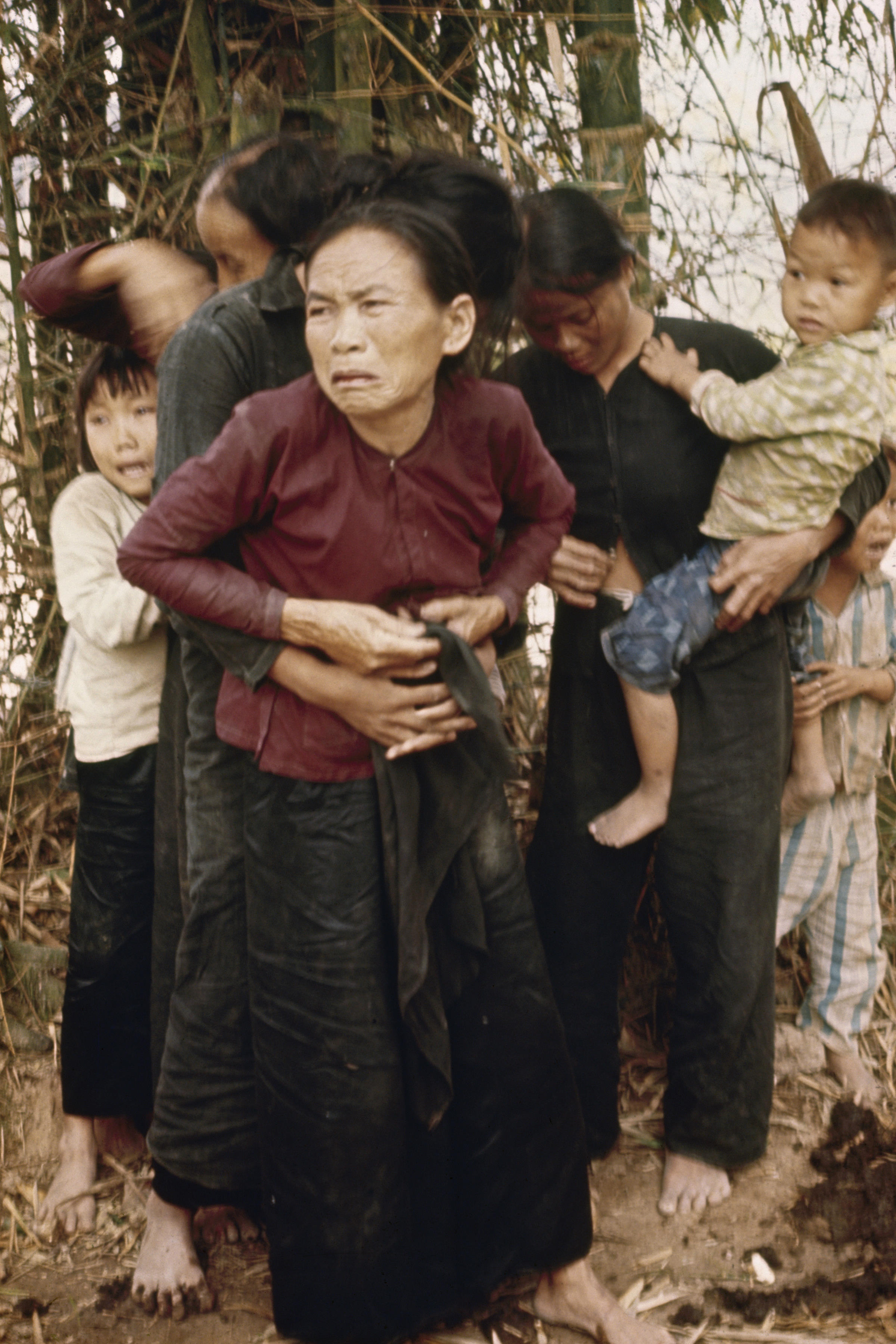
Photograph taken by Ronald L. Haeberle of South Vietnamese women and children in Mỹ Lai before being killed in the massacre. According to Haeberle, soldiers had attempted to rip the blouse off the woman in the back while her mother, in the front of the photo, tried to protect her.

Rape, among other acts of wartime sexual violence, was frequently committed against female Vietnamese civilians during the Vietnam War. It was an aspect of the various human rights abuses perpetrated by the United States and South Korea, as well as by local Vietnamese combatants. According to American political scientist Elisabeth Jean Wood, the sexual violation of women by American military personnel was tolerated by their commanders. American professor Gina Marie Weaver stated that not only were documented crimes against Vietnamese women by American soldiers ignored during the international legal discourse that occurred immediately after the conflict, but modern feminists and other anti-war rape campaigners, as well as historians, have continued to dismiss them.

Some American veterans believe that sexual violence against Vietnamese women was motivated by "racism, sexism, or a combination of both" as a result of the strong social reform movements that were roiling the United States in the early 1970s. According to one source, only 25 cases of rape from the United States Army and 16 cases of rape from the United States Marine Corps resulted in court-martial convictions involving Vietnamese victims between 1965 and 1973.

The issue of pregnancies resulting from rapes has had a significant impact on South Korea–Vietnam relations: these people, conceived through the rape of Vietnamese women by South Korean soldiers, continue to be subjected to discriminatory treatment by the Vietnamese government, while their presence in South Korea is unacknowledged by the South Korean government. In Vietnam, the term "Lai Đại Hàn" ([laːi ɗâˀi hâːn]) refers to a person beget by a Vietnamese mother and a South Korean father during the Vietnam War. The extent of these relationships' sexual consent is still debated; one Japanese study determined that over half of Lai Đại Hàn births had resulted from rape.

=== Indonesia ===
The Indonesian invasion of East Timor and West Papua caused the murders of approximately 300,000 to 400,000 West Papuans and many thousands of women raped.

Research by the Papuan Women's Working Group together with the Asia Justice Rights (AJAR) found 4 out 10 have either experienced shootings, torture, sexual violence, arbitrary detention, husbands/family members lost or killed, husbands/family members detained, or property theft/damaging.

=== Bangladesh genocide ===
During the Bangladesh Liberation War in 1971, numerous women were tortured and raped by the Pakistani army. Exact numbers are not known and are a subject of debate. Most of the women were captured from Dhaka University and private homes and kept as sex-slaves inside the Dhaka Cantonment. Australian Doctor Geoffrey Davis was brought to Bangladesh by the United Nation and International Planned Parenthood Federation to carry out late-term abortions on rape victims. He was of the opinion that the 200,000 to 400,000 rape victims was an underestimate. On the actions of Pakistan army he said "They'd keep the infantry back and put artillery ahead and they would shell the hospitals and schools. And that caused absolute chaos in the town. And then the infantry would go in and begin to segregate the women. Apart from little children, all those were sexually matured would be segregated ... And then the women would be put in the compound under guard and made available to the troops ... Some of the stories they told were appalling. Being raped again and again and again. A lot of them died in those [rape] camps".

Bangladeshi women were raped during the Bangladesh Liberation War in 1971 by the Pakistan army during night raids on villages. Pakistani sources claim the number is much lower, though having not completely denied rape incidents. One work that has included direct experiences from the women raped is Ami Birangana Bolchi (The Voices of War Heroines) by Nilima Ibrahim. The word Birangona (war heroine) is a title given, by Sheikh Mujibur Rahman after the war, to the women raped and tortured during the war. This was a conscious effort to alleviate any social stigma the women might face in the society. How successful this effort was is doubtful, though.

In June 2005, the United States Department of State organized a conference titled "South Asia in Crisis: United States Policy, 1961–1972" where Sarmila Bose, published a paper suggesting that the casualties and rape allegations in the war have been greatly exaggerated for political purposes. This work has been criticized in Bangladesh and her research has been attacked by expatriate Bengalis.

During the war Bengali nationalists also indulged in the mass rape of ethnic Bihari Muslim women, since the Bihari Muslim community had remained loyal to the cause of a united Pakistan.

Anthony Mascarenhas, published a newspaper article in June 1971, in The Sunday Times, London on 13 June 1971 titled "Genocide". The article was the first that exposed the brutal crackdown by the Pakistan army. It also highlighted the rape of Bihari women and other atrocities committed against them by Bengalis. The Sunday Times editor Harold Evans wrote "He'd been shocked by the Bengali outrages in March, but he maintained that what the army was doing was altogether worse and on a grander scale".

=== Soviet invasion of Afghanistan ===
The Soviet forces abducted Afghan women in helicopters while flying in the country in search of mujahideen. In November 1980 a number of such incidents had taken place in various parts of the country, including Laghman and Kama. Soviet soldiers as well as KhAD agents kidnapped young women from the city of Kabul and the areas of Darul Aman and Khair Khana, near the Soviet garrisons, to rape them. Women who returned home were considered 'dishonoured' by their families.

=== 1974 to 1992 ===
In 1974, during the invasion of Cyprus by Turkey, Greek victims of rape were treated and received abortions at the British RAF bases at Akrotiri. Other documented instances of war rape include the First Liberian Civil War, and in East Timor during the occupation by Indonesia in 1975.

It has been reported that in Peru, throughout the 12-year internal conflict, women were frequent victims of sustained war rape perpetrated by government security forces and the Shining Path.

=== Gulf War ===
During the Gulf War and Iraqi occupation of Kuwait, Iraqi military personnel engaged in systematic rape in Kuwait. Iraqi troops raped at least an estimated 5,000 Kuwaiti women. These rapes were perpetrated in front of victims' families or in Iraqi camps. Eyewitness testimonies confirmed the rapes perpetrated by the Iraqi regime. Although rape victims and their families were reluctant to discuss the rapes, several Kuwaiti prisoners reported witnessing Iraqi troops raping women.

=== Bosnian War ===
Rape during the Bosnian War concerns the mass systemic sexual violence mainly targeted against women and girls, but in some instances against males. While people from all ethnic groups committed rape, the vast majority of rapes were perpetrated by Bosnian Serb forces of the Army of the Republika Srpska (VRS) and Serb paramilitary units, who used rape as an instrument of terror and a key tactic in their programme of ethnic cleansing. Estimates of the number of women raped during the war range between 10,000 and 50,000 and of male victims of sexual violence as 3,000. Accurate numbers are difficult to establish and it is believed that the number of unreported cases is much higher than reported ones.

The International Criminal Tribunal for the former Yugoslavia (ICTY) declared that "systematic rape" and "sexual enslavement" in time of war was a crime against humanity, second only to the war crime of genocide. Although the ICTY did not treat the mass rapes as genocide, many have concluded from the organised, and systematic nature of the mass rapes of the female Bosniak (Bosnian Muslim) population, that these rapes were a part of a larger campaign of genocide, and that the VRS were carrying out a policy of genocidal rape against the Bosnian Muslim ethnic group.

The trial of VRS member Dragoljub Kunarac was the first time in any national or international jurisprudence that a person was convicted of using rape as a weapon of war. The widespread media coverage of the atrocities by Serbian paramilitary and military forces against Bosniak women and children, drew international condemnation of the Serbian forces. Following the war, several award-winning documentaries, feature films and plays were produced which cover the rapes and their aftermath.

=== Tigray war ===
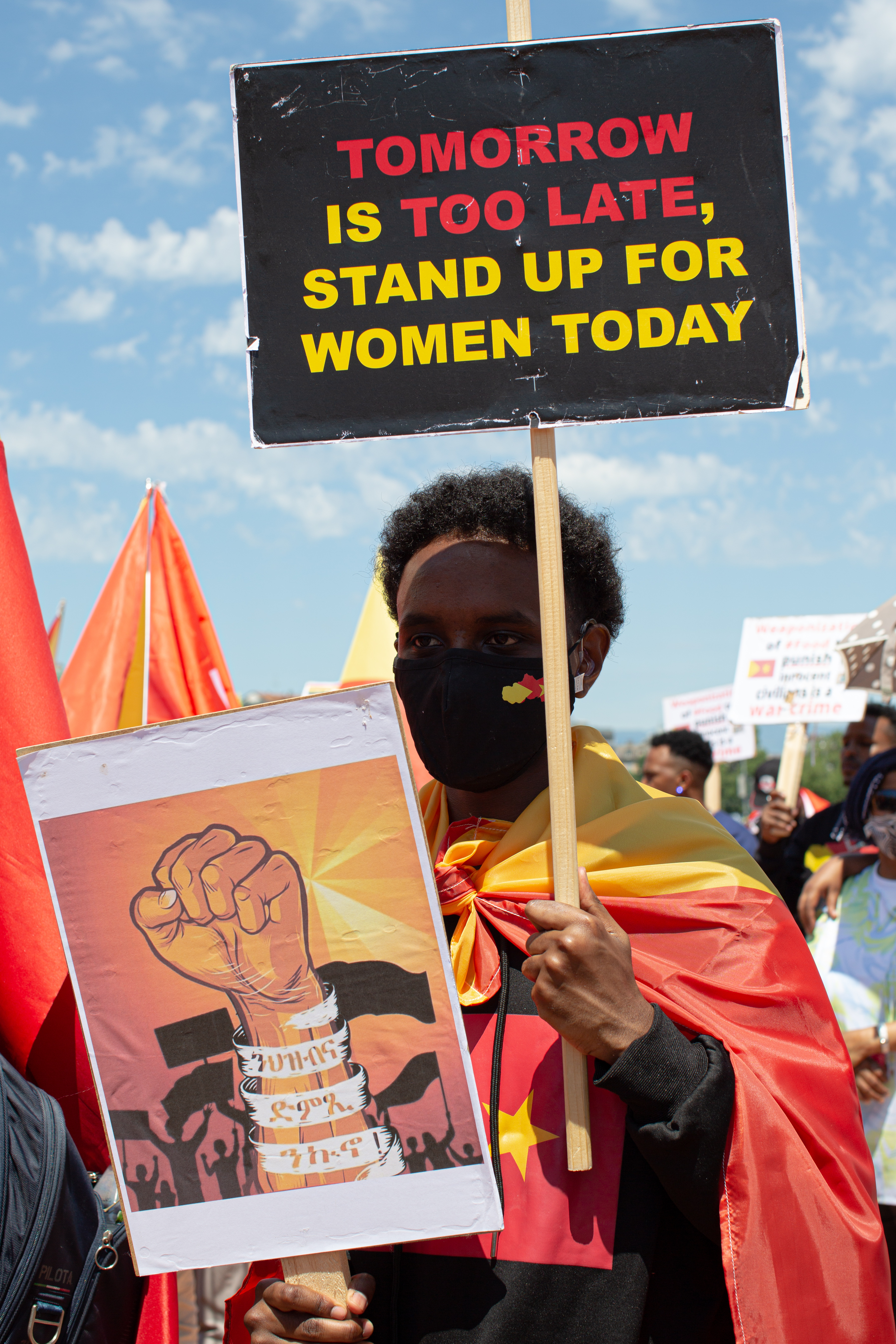
Protestor holding sign in support of women in Tigray

Sexual violence in the Tigray War included, according to the United Nations Special Representative on Sexual Violence in Conflict, Pramila Patten, people forced to rape family members, "sex in exchange for basic commodities", and "increases in the demand for emergency contraception and testing for sexually transmitted infections".

As of August 2021, the number of rape victims ranged from a minimum estimate of 512–516 rapes registered with hospitals in early 2021 to 10,000 rapes, according to British parliamentarian Helen Hayes, and 26,000 women needing sexual and gender-based violence services, according to the United Nations Population Fund. Several claims have been made implicating both sides of the conflict in the systematic use of rape as a weapon of war against the civilian population.

A survey estimated that, over the course of the conflict, around 1 in 10 women in Tigray were subjected to sexual violence, 8 in 100 were subjected to rape, and 4 in 100 were subjected to gang rape. Nails, screws, plastic rubbish and other foreign bodies were forced into reproductive organs of woman, in what was seen as part of a wider effort to destroy fertility of women in Tigray.

=== Myanmar civil war ===
The Myanmar Armed Forces has used multiple forms of sexual violence against civilians for decades, including rape, gang rape, coerced sex, forced marriage, and sexual slavery, and has been singled out by the Secretary-General of the United Nations since 2012. Since the 2021 Myanmar coup d'état, the military has escalated its systemic use of sexual violence, especially against women and political prisoners. Survivors face societal and legal challenges in reporting their crimes. During the Tar Taing massacre in March 2023, army troops raped and sexually assaulted at least 3 women before executing them.

=== 2022 Russian invasion of Ukraine ===
During the 2022 Russian invasion of Ukraine, Ukrainian officials, rights groups, and international media reported growing evidence of sexual violence used by Russian military against Ukrainian women. Survivors of Russian occupation of the areas around Kyiv, such as Bucha, reported gang-rapes, assaults taking place at gunpoint, and rapes committed in front of children. Lyudmyla Denisova, Ukraine's Human Rights Commissioner, stated that sexual violence against civilians was weaponized by Russian soldiers as part of what she referred to as "genocide of Ukrainian people". According to Denisova, as of 6 April 2022, a special telephone helpline had received at least 25 reports of rape of women and girls from Bucha, aged between 14 and 24. The Security Service of Ukraine posted a recording allegedly of a Russian woman encouraging her deployed partner to rape Ukrainian women as long as he uses protection.

In October 2022, a UN official stated that Russia was using rape as part of its "military strategy", and that the actual number of victims was likely far higher than the official statistics.

=== Gaza war ===
During the ongoing Gaza war, Israeli male and female soldiers, guards and medical staff have reportedly committed wartime sexual violence against Palestinian women, children and men including rape, gang-rape and sexualized torture and genital mutilation. In February 2024, UN experts reported at least two cases of Palestinian women being raped by male Israeli soldiers. Palestinian boys and men have also been reportedly raped and subjected to torture, and in some cases, the impact of rape and torture has led to death of the victim.

In its June 2024 investigative report, the UN's Independent International Commission of Inquiry on the Occupied Palestinian Territory (CoI) concluded,

The frequency, prevalence and severity of sexual and gender-based crimes perpetrated against Palestinians since 7 October across the Occupied Palestinian Territories (OPT) indicate that specific forms of Sexual and gender-based violence (SGBV) are part of Israeli Security Forces (ISF) operating procedures.

In August 2024, Israeli human rights organization, B'Tselem, released a report on systematic Israeli abuse, torture, sexual violence and rape of Palestinian detainees, calling the Israeli prison system a "network of torture camps". The report includes extensive testimonies from Palestinians. The Guardian also interviewed Palestinian detainees, and reported they "back up [the] report by rights group B'Tselem, which says jails should now be labelled 'torture camps'."

In March 2025, the UN’s Independent International Commission of Inquiry on the Occupied Palestinian Territory published a report on sexual and gender-based abuses perpetrated by Israel against the Palestinian people, which concluded that sexual abuse of Palestinians is "committed either under explicit orders or with implicit encouragement by Israel's top civilian and military leadership." Acts of sexual violence such as compulsory nudity, rape threats and sexual assault "comprise part of the Israeli Security Forces' standard operating procedures toward Palestinians", says the report, with Commission member Chris Sidoti adding that, "Sexual violence is now so widespread that it can only be considered systematic. It's got beyond the level of random acts by rogue individuals." In addition to concluding that Israel uses sexual violence to "dominate and destroy the Palestinian people", the report also lists several measures taken by Israel during the Gaza War, such as the bombing of Gaza's reproductive clinics and restrictions on the arrival of medical supplies, as genocidal acts aimed at destroying the reproductive rights of Palestinian women and preventing the birth of Palestinian babies.

In May 2026, Israel was added to the United Nations blacklist of countries committing wartime sexual violence. The UN states that a thorough investigation into the sexual abuse of Palestinians by Israelis is being hindered by Israeli bans on visits by UN experts and Israeli threats of retaliation against Palestinian detainees if they report abuse after their release.
