= Kokura incident =

1950 mass rape by the United States Army

- Part of the Korean War, World War II Occupation of Japan
- Location: Kokura, Fukuoka Prefecture
- Date: July 11, 1950
- Target: Japanese women
- Attack type: mass rape
- Perpetrator: United States Army 24th Infantry Regiment
- Motive: Anti-Japanese racism

The Kokura incident (小倉黒人米兵集団脱走事件) was a mass rape event by mutinous American soldiers of the 24th Infantry Regiment (United States) against Japanese women in the city of Kokura, Fukuoka Prefecture, in July 1950, after the soldiers rioted against deployment to Korea.

== Preceding incident ==
On 4 July 1950, 22-year-old American soldier James L. Clark from Marks, Mississippi attacked a Japanese family in Kokura. Clark killed the family's two sons and their parents, leaving Keiko, a seven-year-old girl, as the family's sole surviving member. American soldiers and their wives later contributed to a fund for Keiko's support. Clark's original death sentence was commuted and he was not executed.

== Riot ==
On 11 July 1950 in Kokura, soldiers of the U.S. 24th Infantry Regiment, which was at Camp Jōno, were ordered to deploy into the Korean war. The soldiers rioted and 75, 100, 200, or 250 soldiers escaped the camp and began attacking and raping Japanese women in Kokura; they also killed a Japanese man. According to later testimony “revealed in the 1975 Fukuoka Prefectural edition of the Asahi...some women were sexually assaulted in front of their husbands". The mass rapes were mentioned in a U.S. military police report to the Fukuoka Area Provost Marshal, chief of Kyushu Civil affairs region, on 17 July 1950.

The U.S. military censored all mention of the rapes in Japanese media.

== In media ==
Seichō Matsumoto, a Japanese man from Kokura, wrote a novel based on the events. African-American scholar Duchess Harris' essay, "How negative stereotypes in material culture impact global politics", critices Matsumoto's novelisation for focusing on race in the incident, saying "The image of the Black GI as rapist has become something of a staple in Japanese pornography and films about the Occupation. The Black rapist trope also appears in Matsumoto Seicho’s short story, Kuroji no e.” Others also criticised his racial focus.

== Aftermath ==
After fighting in the Korean War, the 24th Infantry regiment was dissolved on 1 October 1951 and its soldiers discharged from duty.

== See also ==
- Ryuichi Tsukamoto
