= Duchess Harris =

African-American Scholar

- Born: Virginia
- Education: University of Pennsylvania (BA); University of Minnesota (PhD); William Mitchell College of Law (JD)
- Occupations: Special Assistant to the Provost at Macalester College and Professor of American Studies
- Known for: Higher Education Administration
- Website: https://www.duchessharris.com/

Duchess Harris is Special Assistant to the Provost for Strategic Initiatives at Macalester College. She is an African-American academic, author, and legal scholar. She is a professor of American Studies at Macalester College in Saint Paul, Minnesota, specializing in feminism, United States law, and African American political movements. She also teaches a course on Black Health at the University of Minnesota Law School.

== Education ==
Harris was born in Virginia, the daughter of Miriam Mann Harris and Frank Harris, Jr. Her maternal grandmother, Miriam Daniel Mann, was a mathematician at NASA. When she was 14, Harris received an academic scholarship to attend Canterbury School in New Milford, Connecticut. Harris completed her undergraduate degree at the University of Pennsylvania, where she was a Mellon Mays Fellow. During her time in college, Harris was elected student body president. She was the first Black woman to serve in this role at an Ivy League institution and was a key activist figure in her class. Her activism was reported in Wayne Glasker's, Black Students in the Ivory Tower: African American Student Activism at the University of Pennsylvania, 1967-1990. In 1991, Harris earned her Bachelor of Arts in American history and Afro-American studies, and in 1997 she earned her PhD in American Studies from the University of Minnesota. Her dissertation was nominated for the Henry Gabriel Prize. That same year she was named one of "Thirty Young Leaders of the Future" by Ebony Magazine. In 2007 Harris began law school at Mitchell Hamline School of Law, where she earned her J.D. in 2011.

== Career ==
Harris was a postdoctoral fellow at the Institute on Race and Poverty at the University of Minnesota Law School under the direction of John A. Powell; and she was Rockefeller Humanities Resident with the Institute of African-American Studies, University of Georgia. Harris was a policy fellow for the Hubert. H. Humphrey Institute of Public Affairs, and served on the Shirley Chisholm Presidential Accountability Commission in 2010. Her writing and commentary have appeared in Litigation News, The Huffington Post, The Feminist Wire, and Race-Talk. While attending law school, Harris co-founded the William Mitchell Law Raza Journal, an online, interactive scholarly publication on the issues of race and the law. Her scholarship has been supported through a Bush Foundation Leadership Fellowship. She joined the faculty at Macalester College in 1998, as a Political Science professor, and subsequently founded the American Studies department in 2003. Harris has served as a diversity consultant for dozens of national organizations. Harris lectures and speaks on the subjects of race, law, and feminism for universities, conferences, and commencements.

A novel was written by Seichō Matsumoto based on the true events in the Kokura incident where US troops raped Japanese women on 11 July 1950. Duchess Harris wrote an essay “How negative stereotypes in material culture impact global politics”, criticising Matsumoto's novelisation for focusing on race in the incident, saying “The image of the Black GI as rapist has become something of a staple in Japanese pornography and films about the Occupation. The Black rapist trope also appears in Matsumoto Seicho’s short story, Kuroji no e.” Others also criticised his racial focus.

== Published works ==
=== Racially Writing the Republic: Racists, Race Rebels, and Transformations of American Identity ===
Harris's first book, Racially Writing the Republic: Racists, Race Rebels, and Transformations of American Identity was co authored with Bruce Baum in 2009. Racially Writing the Republic investigates the central role of race in the construction and transformation of American national identity from the Revolutionary War era to the height of the civil rights movement. Drawing on political theory, American studies, critical race theory, and gender studies, the contributors to this collection highlight the assumptions of white (and often male) supremacy underlying the thought and actions of major U.S. political and social leaders. At the same time, they examine how nonwhite writers and activists have struggled against racism and for the full realization of America's political ideals. The essays are arranged chronologically by subject, and, with one exception, each essay is focused on a single figure, from George Washington to James Baldwin. The Journal of American History referred to it as "American Studies at its finest".

=== Black Feminist Politics from Kennedy to Trump ===
In 2018 Harris published Black Feminist Politics from Kennedy to Trump. Black Feminist Politics from Kennedy to Trump investigates the mainstreaming of Black feminist politics in the 21st century through studying key Black woman leaders in politics and social movements. Beginning in the mid 20th century, the book examines the political repercussions of the increased incarceration of Black men in the 1980s, leading to Black women mobilizing politically on a broad scale. This political mobilization is continuously felt today, through Black women's involvement in local and national politics and political organizing. Harris argues that while Barack Obama's presidency galvanized Black Americans to show up for the polls in record numbers, the rise of the Black Lives Matter movement early in his second term spoke to the divisions and disagreements of Black Americans, the latter of whom felt Obama's policies were achieving little to alleviate systemic barriers against Black Americans, along with the pervasive issue of police violence against Black Americans. The book also examines the question of how social media and digital organizing have amplified the platform and reshaping contemporary political struggles, specifically with the rise of the Black Lives Matter movement.

=== Black Girl Magic Beyond the Hashtag ===
In 2020, Harris co-edited with Julia Jordan Zachery, Black Girl Magic Beyond the Hashtag: Twenty-First-Century Acts of Self-Definition. The collection of essays is about how is Black Girl Magic is experienced offline, and how Black women and girls foster community, counter invisibility, engage in restorative acts, and create spaces for freedom. Ms. magazine wrote about its publication,

An interdisciplinary collection of essays, this volume presents readers with a variety of critical feminist examinations and representations of #BlackGirlMagic offline and in the world. It is full of thoughtful and engaging pieces that will have broad appeal.

=== Duchess Harris Collection ===
Harris also serves as the curator and co-author of the "Duchess Harris Collection", a set of scholarly books for students in Middle and High School, alongside ABDO publishing company. The "Duchess Harris Collection" focuses on historical and contemporary events and legislation that have had important political repercussions on both a national and global level. Packaged in sets of six to twelve books, each series addresses a different political or cultural event; for example "Race and the American Law", "Class in America", "Race and Sports", and "News Literacy".

== Bibliography ==
=== Books and edited volumes ===
- 2009. Racially Writing the Republic: Racists, Race Rebels, and Transformations of American Identity. Duke University Press, ed. with Bruce Baum. ISBN 0822344475.
- 2009. Black Feminist Politics from Kennedy to Clinton Palgrave Macmillan. ISBN 978-0230613300
- 2011. Black Feminist Politics from Kennedy to Obama (Second edn). Palgrave Macmillan. ISBN 0230112552
- 2015. Black Lives Matter. ABDO Publishing with Sue Bradford Edwards. ISBN 978-1624038983
- 2016 "Hidden Human Computers: The Black Women of NASA." ABDO Publishing with Sue Bradford Edwards ISBN 1680783874
- 2017 "Race and Policing" ABDO Publishing with Rebecca Rissman ISBN 1532110359
- 2018 Black Feminist Politics from Kennedy to Trump
- 2017-2019 The Duchess Harris Collection
- 2019 Black Girl Magic Beyond the Hashtag: Twenty-First Century Acts of Self-Definition

=== Contributions to books and essays ===
- 2001. "Nineteenth Century Black Feminist Writing and Organizing as a Humanist Act". In Anthony B. Pinn (ed.), By These Hands: A Documentary History of African-American Humanism, pp. 55–70. New York University Press. ISBN 0814766722.
- 2001. "From Kennedy to Combahee: Black Feminist Activism from 1960 to 1980". In Bettye Collier-Thomas, V.P. Franklin (eds.) Sisters in the Struggle: African-American Women in the Civil Rights-Black Power Movement. pp. 280–305. New York University Press. ISBN 0814716032.
- 2004. "To Die for the People's Temple: The Appropriation of Huey Newton by Jim Jones" with Adam John Waterman. In Rebecca Moore, Anthony B. Pinn, and Mary R. Sawyer (eds), Peoples Temple and Black Religion in America. pp. 103–122. Indiana University Press. ISBN 0253216559.
- 2018. "Michelle Obama Raising Black Daughters to Be Magic," which is a chapter in Michelle Obama's Impact on African American Women and Girls by Michelle Duster (Editor), Paula Marie Seniors (Editor), Rose C. Thevenin (Editor) 2018
