= Ryuichi Tsukamoto =

Japanese serial killer

- Born: Unknown; June 16, 1950 (age 76); Shiogama, Miyagi Prefecture, Japan
- Status: Paroled
- Convictions: Murder (3 counts); Robbery; Attempted robbery Theft; Attempted theft
- Penalty: Life imprisonment

Details
- Victims: 3
- Span of crimes: 1966–1967
- Country: Japan
- States: Aichi, Chiba, Yamanashi
- Date apprehended: January 23, 1967

Ryuichi Tsukamoto (born June 16, 1950) is the alias of a Japanese serial killer who, as a teenager, killed three women in three separate prefectures between 1966 and 1967. Dubbed by investigators "Metropolitan Designated Case No. 106", Tsukamoto was convicted and sentenced to life imprisonment in 1972, but is believed to have been paroled in the late 1980s.

== Early life ==
Ryuichi Tsukamoto was born on June 16, 1950, in Shiogama, the son of a black American soldier, A. Johnson, who had been stationed at a nearby military base, and a 16-year-old Japanese girl. It is said that Tsukamoto had trouble breathing when he was born, possibly due to complications relating to his underage mother's pregnancy.

About a week after his birth, the Korean War broke out, resulting in his father being dispatched to Korea, where he was later killed in combat. At the age of 4, his mother married an American soldier in Fukuoka, with whom she later returned to the US, leaving her illegitimate son in the care of her grandparents in Sendai. According to author Shigeru Azuchi, he was then living under his mother's surname, which, according to Azuchi, is "a common Japanese surname starting with an S."

In 1955, a pair of American soldiers offered Tsukamoto's grandmother to adopt him. She initially agreed to the proposal, but later turned the offer down when the couple demanded 50,000 yen from her. Three years later, the grandmother died, and Tsukamoto was taken in by his uncle, an employee of the Japanese National Railways who had a wife and children.

Despite his mixed-race heritage, Tsukamoto was never bullied by his peers, who feared him due to his remarkable physical strength. Due to this, however, he distanced himself from others and frequently skipped school to walk alone in the fields, explored temples or hid under cars. His grades in every subject, with the exception of physical education where he outperformed even older students in high jumping, saw a gradual decline as a result. Tsukamoto also showed violent tendencies at home, where he would cut furniture with a knife or break roof tiles if he wasn't given something he wanted.

In his second year of junior high school, Tsukamoto was arrested for the first time after he attempted to steal an air gun from a gun shop. For this crime, he was sent to a juvenile welfare facility in Sendai, where he was ostracized by other teenagers for his skin color. In response, he would beat up the offenders, and less than two months after his admission, he again found himself isolated from others. Despite this, Tsukamoto developed a close relationship with the dormitory overseer, seeing her as a parental figure. Wishing to be her "son", he began using the alias "Ryuichi Tsukamoto" in her honor.

Like with school, Tsukamoto would frequently skip lessons, sometimes for weeks on end, during which he travelled to Toyohashi and Osaka, but always returned to Sendai. It is said that he would take questionnaires about future aspirations, where he would write that he wished to become a sailor and travel the world. However, as this could only be achieved through registering through the employment security office, Tsukamoto decided to begin an apprenticeship at an automobile maintenance shop in April 1966, where he was described as a diligent and obedient worker by his boss. By June of that year, however, he started skipping out on work and eventually left altogether. He then stole some money from a house and used it to travel to Kyushu, his mother's ancestral home, where he remained for some time before returning to Sendai.

== Murders ==
Soon after his return to Sendai, Tsukamoto began burgling people's homes. He was caught in early September and confessed to 11 burglaries, for which he was sent to a juvenile detention facility. However, soon after his arrival, the facility experience an outbreak of dysentery, and since Tsukamoto was the suspected originator, he was sent for treatment at the Tsutsujigaoka Hospital. He escaped from the hospital on October 4 and jumped aboard a train headed towards Niigata. From October 11 onwards, he stole money from houses he burgled, travelling from prefecture to prefecture and staying at hotels to avoid getting caught.

Tsukamoto's first murder occurred on December 13, 1966, when he broke into a house in Toyohashi. In it, he came across the 24-year-old pregnant housewife Kazuko Ando, whom Tsukamoto accosted, tied her hands up with her own clothes and then strangled her with a towel. He then dragged the body to the bathroom, filled the bathtub with water and pressed her head underwater. After killing Ando, he stole 20,000 yen and fled the house, leaving Ando's body to be discovered by her husband later in the day.

In the middle of the night of December 27, Tsukamoto broke into another house in Abiko, in which 28-year-old housewife Yoshiko Watanabe and her 3-month-old baby were in. Tsukamoto beat and then tied her hands with shoelaces, before wrapping her head and neck in a futon, strangling her in the process. He then ripped open her sweater, and stabbed Watanabe in the left breast with a sharp object. After killing her, he stole 24,000 yen and left the house, sparing the baby. Watanabe's body was found on the next day by her husband.

His third and final murder occurred on January 16, 1967, when he broke into a house in Kōfu. Once inside, he came across 25-year-old Yoshimi Watanabe, whom he proceeded to bind and gag. He then took a knife and sliced up her clothing, before grabbing an electrical cord and strangling her with it. Tsukamoto then grabbed a blunt instrument and hit her on the head, before grabbing some nearby sausages, cucumbers and eggs, which he proceeded to forcefully insert into her genitalia. Finally, he dragged the body to the upper floor, where he left it hanging from an alcove. Tsukamoto then rummaged through the drawers, stole 10,000 yen and left. Watanabe's body, which had blood gushing from her mouth and crotch, was later found by her mother and the janitor's wife.

== Investigation and arrest ==
Due to the similarity in the three murders, the police departments in Toyohashi, Abiko and Kōfu all worked in unison to resolve the cases. After interviewing witnesses, police deduced that in each case, a young man with short hair and brown skin had been seen wandering around the areas. While going over the clues, it was noticed that the towel used in the first murder had an engraving of the Futaba Ryokan, a local hotel. When they cross-checked with hotel staff, they revealed that they had a guest matching the description, who registered himself as "Ryuichi Tsukamoto" and claimed to be from Sendai.

On January 23, 1967, the wife of a police officer in Kashiwa noticed a young boy matching the description of the offender her husband had told her about, carrying a bag and walking towards the train station. She immediately contacted police, who detained the teenager. When asked to show his residency permit, the detainee replied that he was a Japanese citizen, and was then brought to the police station for further interrogation. There, he professed that his name was Ryuichi Tsukamoto, but after investigators found a knife, a screwdriver and adhesive plaster in his bag, he broke down and confessed both his real name and to the crimes.

== Trial, sentence and current status ==
On May 25, 1967, Ryuichi Tsukamoto was put on trial for the three murders, as well as multiple charges of theft, attempted burglary, robbery and attempted robbery. Throughout the proceedings, Tsukamoto stood expressionless and simply glanced at the audience, and when pressed about his motive by the judges, he claimed that he had killed the women because "he hated their eyes". On September 9, 1972, the Chiba District Court found him guilty. Although relatives of his victims wanted Tsukamoto executed, he was sentenced to life in prison due to his age. He was sent to the Osaka Prison, and never appealed his sentence.

Tsukamoto's later fate was left unclear until 1997, when journalist Shigeru Azuchi was interviewed by Takarajimasha. In the interview, Azuchi claimed that he had met Tsukamoto while serving a 15-year sentence for fraud at the Osaka Prison, and that they remained friends even after his early release. According to Azuchi, Tsukamoto was paroled in his late 30s, is currently working a regular job and has vowed to remain single for the rest of his life, as penance for his crimes. Following the interview, Azuchi wrote a book detailing the case, which he published in March 1999.

== See also ==
- List of serial killers by country
