= List of diplomatic missions of Lebanon =

This is a list of diplomatic missions of Lebanon, excluding honorary consulates.

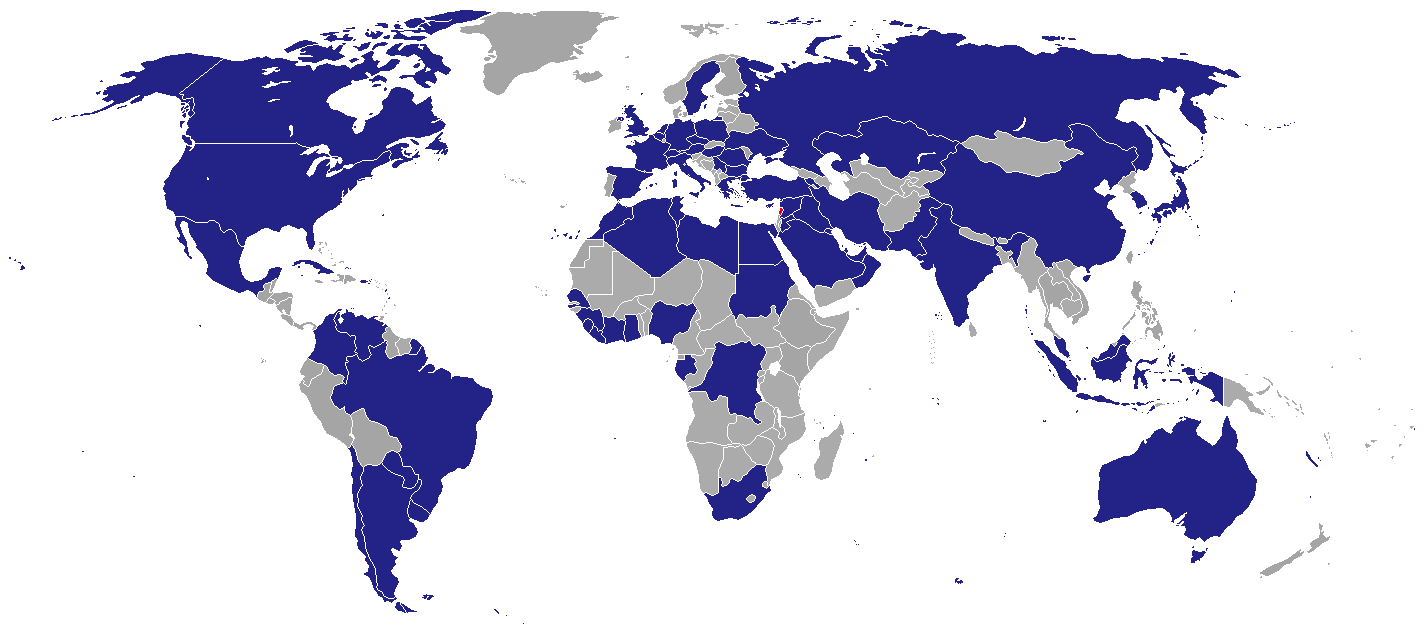
Diplomatic missions of Lebanon

== Current missions ==
=== Africa ===
Host country	Host city	Mission	Concurrent accreditation	Ref.
Algeria	Algiers	Embassy		
DR Congo	Kinshasa	Embassy	Countries: Burundi Central African Republic Congo Rwanda Tanzania Uganda	
Egypt	Cairo	Embassy	Countries: Comoros Djibouti Ethiopia Kenya; International Organization: Arab League	
Egypt	Alexandria	Consulate-General	Countries: Comoros Djibouti Ethiopia Kenya; International Organization: Arab League	
Gabon	Libreville	Embassy	Countries: Cameroon Chad São Tomé and Príncipe Seychelles; International Organization: ECCAS	
Ghana	Accra	Embassy	Countries: Benin Togo	
Guinea	Conakry	Embassy	Countries: Guinea-Bissau Equatorial Guinea	
Ivory Coast	Abidjan	Embassy	Countries: Burkina Faso Niger	
Liberia	Monrovia	Embassy	Countries: Mali	
Libya	Tripoli	Embassy		
Morocco	Rabat	Embassy		
Nigeria	Abuja	Embassy		
Nigeria	Lagos	Consulate-General		
Senegal	Dakar	Embassy	Countries: Cape Verde Gambia Mauritania	
Sierra Leone	Freetown	Embassy		
South Africa	Pretoria	Embassy	Countries: Angola Botswana Eswatini Lesotho Madagascar Malawi Mauritius Mozambique Namibia Zambia Zimbabwe	
Sudan	Khartoum	Embassy	Countries: South Sudan	
Tunisia	Tunis	Embassy		

=== Americas ===
Host country	Host city	Mission	Concurrent accreditation	Ref.
Argentina	Buenos Aires	Embassy		
Brazil	Brasília	Embassy		
Brazil	Rio de Janeiro	Consulate-General		
Brazil	São Paulo	Consulate-General		
Canada	Ottawa	Embassy		
Canada	Montreal	Consulate-General		
Chile	Santiago de Chile	Embassy		
Colombia	Bogotá	Embassy		
Cuba	Havana	Embassy	Countries: Jamaica	
Ecuador	Quito	Embassy		
Mexico	Mexico City	Embassy	Countries: Belize Costa Rica El Salvador Guatemala Honduras Nicaragua	
Paraguay	Asunción	Embassy		
United States	Washington, D.C.	Embassy		
United States	Detroit	Consulate-General		
United States	Los Angeles	Consulate-General		
United States	New York City	Consulate-General		
Uruguay	Montevideo	Embassy		
Venezuela	Caracas	Embassy	Countries: Antigua and Barbuda Bahamas Barbados Dominica Dominican Republic Grenada Guyana Haiti Saint Kitts and Nevis Saint Lucia Suriname Trinidad and Tobago	

=== Asia ===
Host country	Host city	Mission	Concurrent accreditation	Ref.
Armenia	Yerevan	Embassy	Countries: Georgia	
Bahrain	Manama	Embassy		
China	Beijing	Embassy	Countries: Cambodia Laos North Korea Mongolia Myanmar Vietnam	
India	New Delhi	Embassy	Countries: Bangladesh Bhutan Maldives Nepal Sri Lanka Thailand	
Indonesia	Jakarta	Embassy	Countries: Timor-Leste	
Iran	Tehran	Embassy	Countries: Azerbaijan	
Iraq	Baghdad	Embassy		
Japan	Tokyo	Embassy	Countries: Philippines	
Jordan	Amman	Embassy	Countries: Palestine	
Kazakhstan	Astana	Embassy	Countries: Kyrgyzstan Turkmenistan Uzbekistan	
Kuwait	Kuwait City	Embassy		
Malaysia	Kuala Lumpur	Embassy	Countries: Brunei Singapore	
Oman	Muscat	Embassy		
Pakistan	Islamabad	Embassy	Countries: Afghanistan Tajikistan	
Qatar	Doha	Embassy		
Saudi Arabia	Riyadh	Embassy	International Organizations: OIC	
Saudi Arabia	Jeddah	Consulate-General	International Organizations: OIC	
South Korea	Seoul	Embassy		
Syria	Damascus	Embassy		
Turkey	Ankara	Embassy		
Turkey	Istanbul	Consulate-General		
United Arab Emirates	Abu Dhabi	Embassy		
United Arab Emirates	Dubai	Consulate-General		
Yemen	Sanaa	Embassy	Countries: Eritrea Somalia	

=== Europe ===
Host country	Host city	Mission	Concurrent accreditation	Ref.
Austria	Vienna	Embassy	Countries: Croatia Slovakia Slovenia; International Organizations: CTBTO IAEA United Nations	
Belgium	Brussels	Embassy	Countries: Luxembourg; International Organizations: European Union	
Bulgaria	Sofia	Embassy		
Cyprus	Nicosia	Embassy		
Czech Republic	Prague	Embassy		
France	Paris	Embassy	Countries: Andorra Monaco; International Organization: Francophonie	
France	Marseille	Consulate-General	Countries: Andorra Monaco; International Organization: Francophonie	
Germany	Berlin	Embassy		
Greece	Athens	Embassy	Countries: Albania	
Holy See (Note: The Lebanese Embassy to the Holy See is located outside Vatican territory in Rome.)	Rome	Embassy	Countries: Portugal Sovereign Military Order of Malta	
Hungary	Budapest	Embassy		
Italy	Rome	Embassy	Countries: Malta San Marino	
Italy	Milan	Consulate-General	Countries: Malta San Marino	
Netherlands	The Hague	Embassy		
Poland	Warsaw	Embassy	Countries: Estonia Latvia Lithuania	
Romania	Bucharest	Embassy	Countries: Moldova	
Russia	Moscow	Embassy	Countries: Belarus	
Serbia	Belgrade	Embassy	Countries: Bosnia and Herzegovina Montenegro North Macedonia	
Spain	Madrid	Embassy	International Organization: Union for the Mediterranean	
Sweden	Stockholm	Embassy	Countries: Denmark Finland Iceland Norway	
Switzerland	Bern	Embassy	Country: Liechtenstein	
Ukraine	Kyiv	Embassy		
United Kingdom	London	Embassy	Country: Ireland	

=== Oceania ===
Host country	Host city	Mission	Concurrent accreditation	Ref.
Australia	Canberra	Embassy	Country: Fiji Kiribati Marshall Islands Micronesia Nauru New Zealand Palau Papua New Guinea Samoa Solomon Islands Tonga Tuvalu Vanuatu	
Australia	Melbourne	Consulate-General	Country: Fiji Kiribati Marshall Islands Micronesia Nauru New Zealand Palau Papua New Guinea Samoa Solomon Islands Tonga Tuvalu Vanuatu	
Australia	Sydney	Consulate-General	Country: Fiji Kiribati Marshall Islands Micronesia Nauru New Zealand Palau Papua New Guinea Samoa Solomon Islands Tonga Tuvalu Vanuatu	

=== Multilateral organizations ===
Organization	Host city	Host country	Mission	Concurrent accreditation	Ref.
United Nations	New York City	United States	Permanent Mission		
United Nations	Geneva	Switzerland	Permanent Mission		
UNESCO	Paris	France	Permanent Delegation		

== Gallery ==
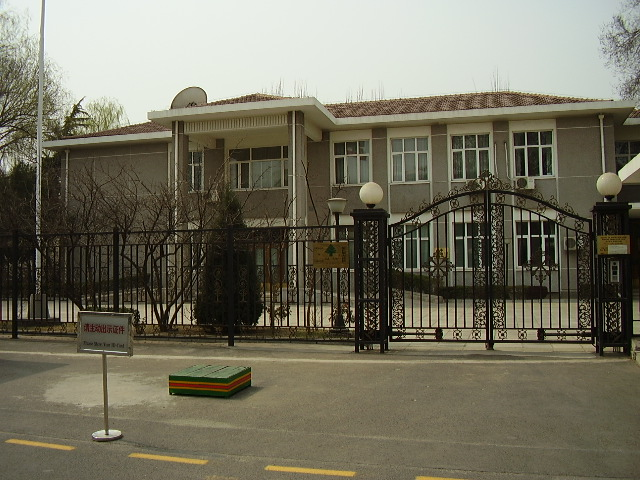
Embassy in Beijing

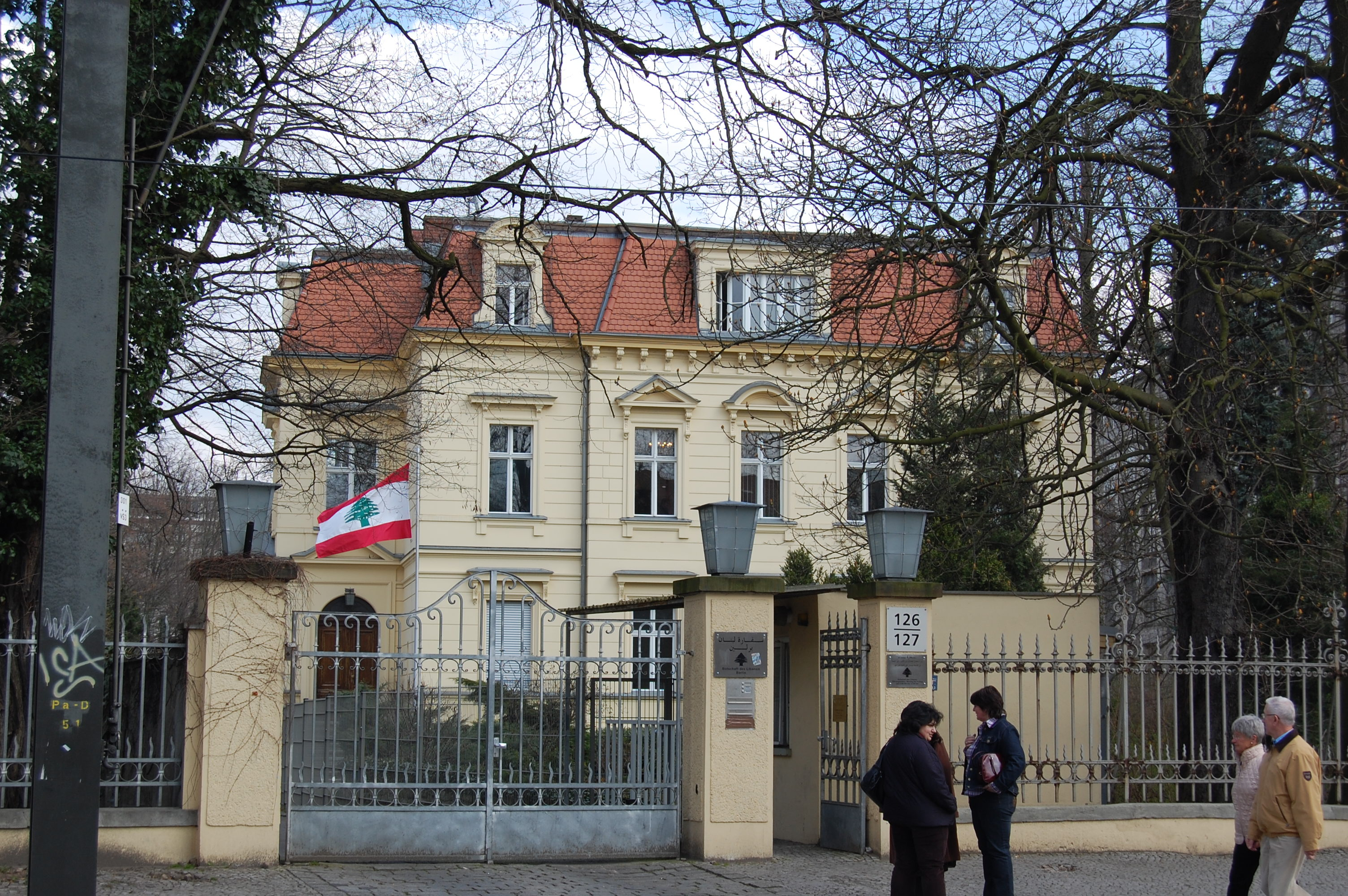
Embassy in Berlin

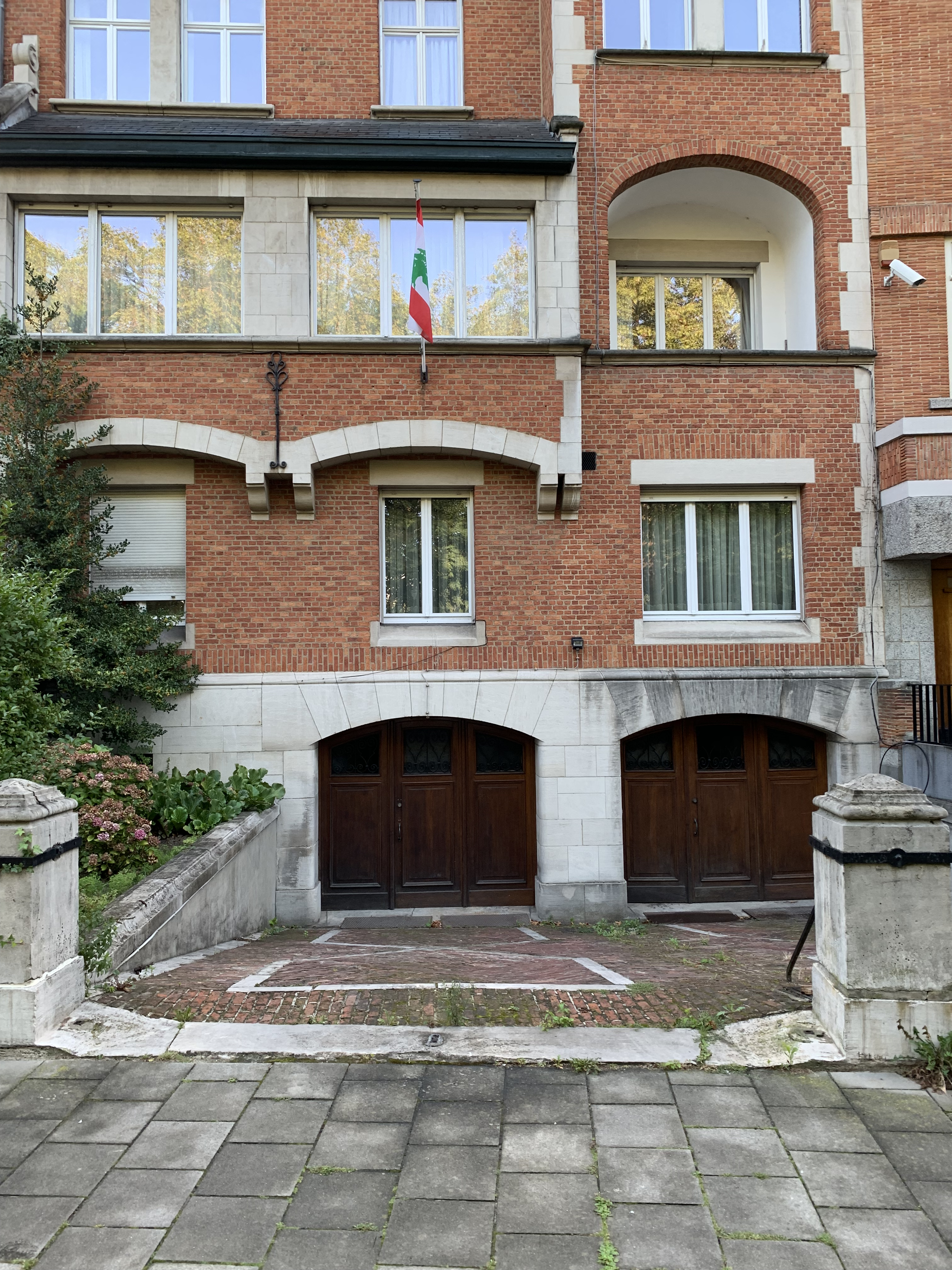
Embassy in Brussels

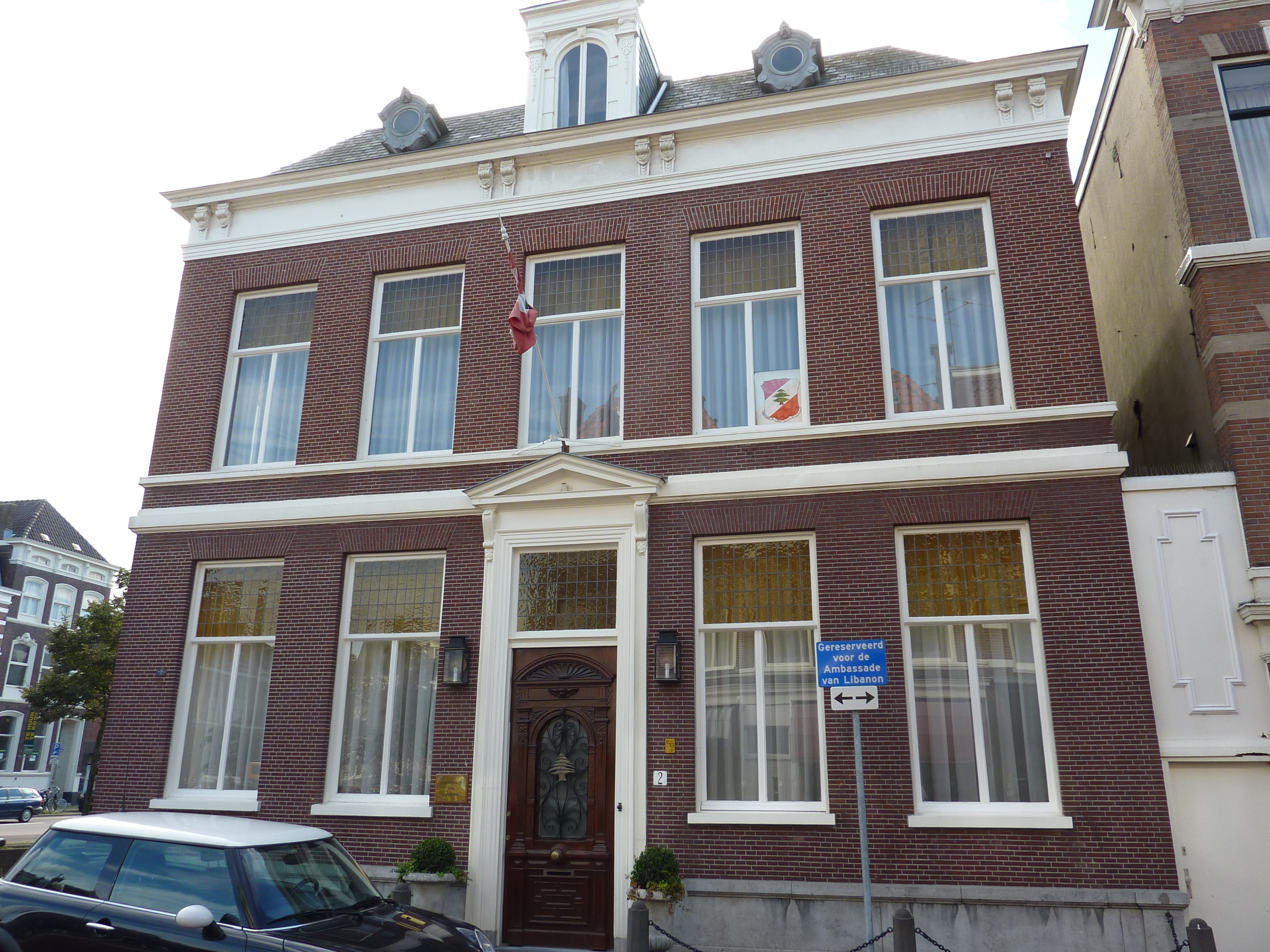
Embassy in The Hague

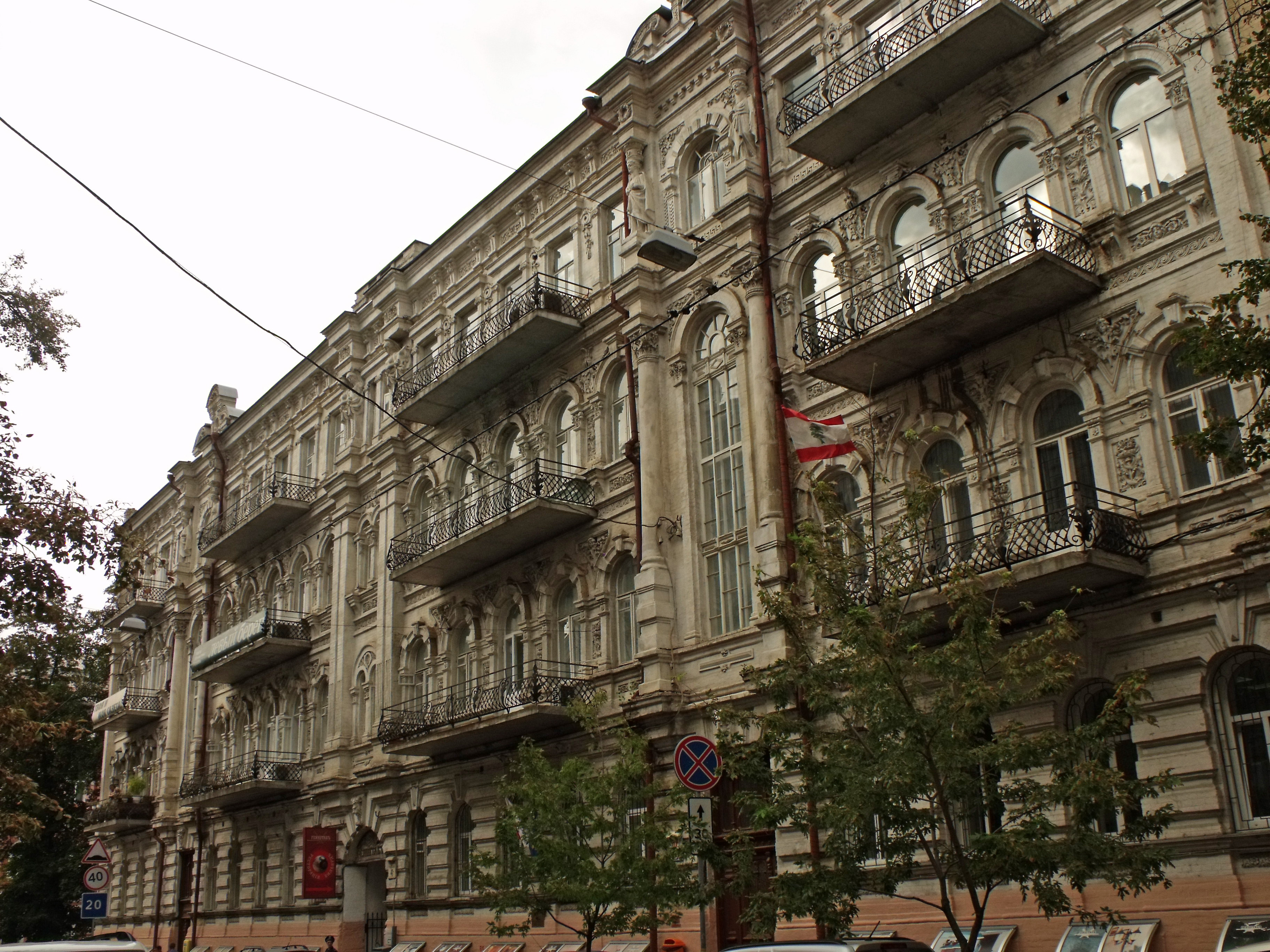
Embassy in Kyiv

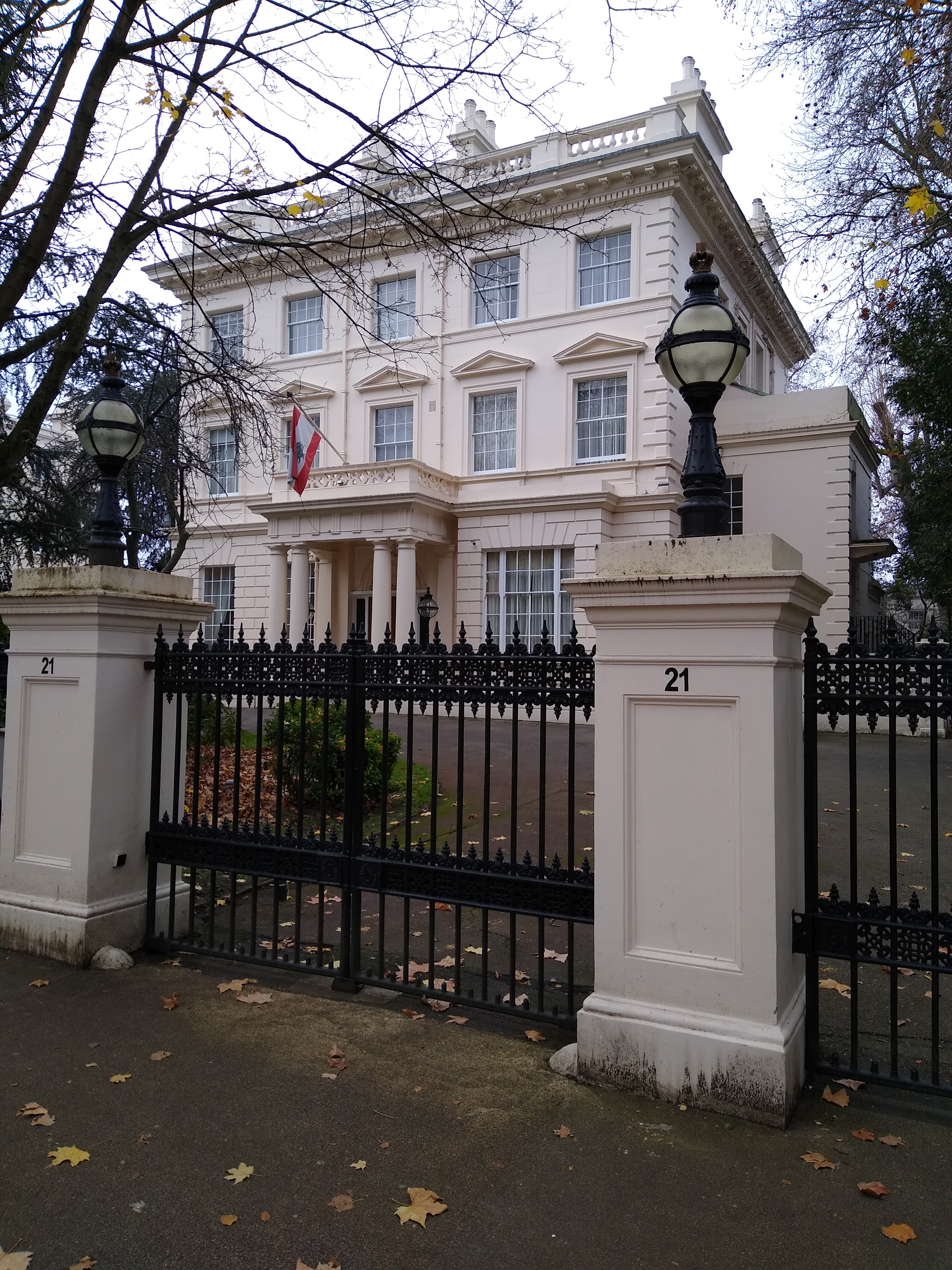
Embassy in London

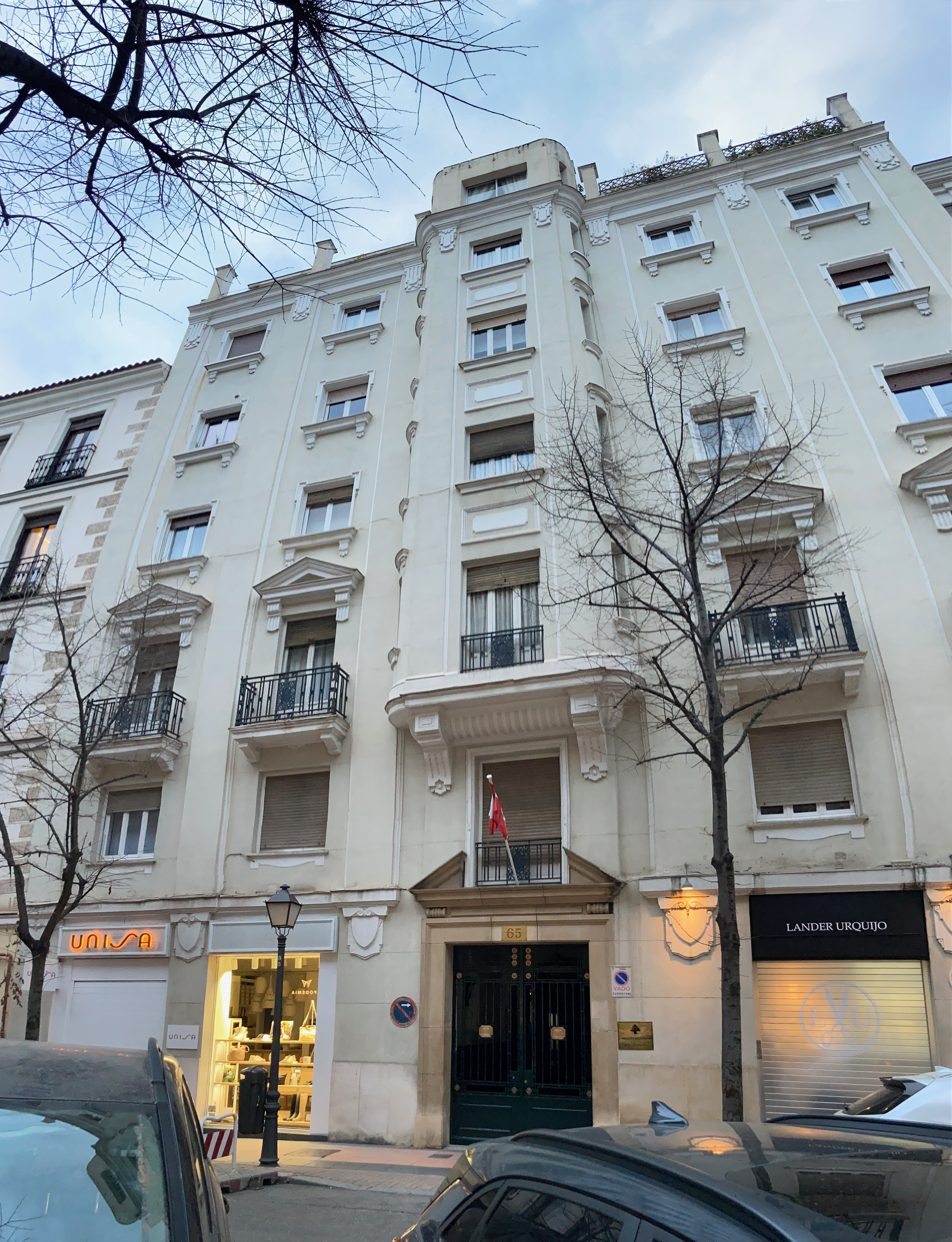
Embassy in Madrid

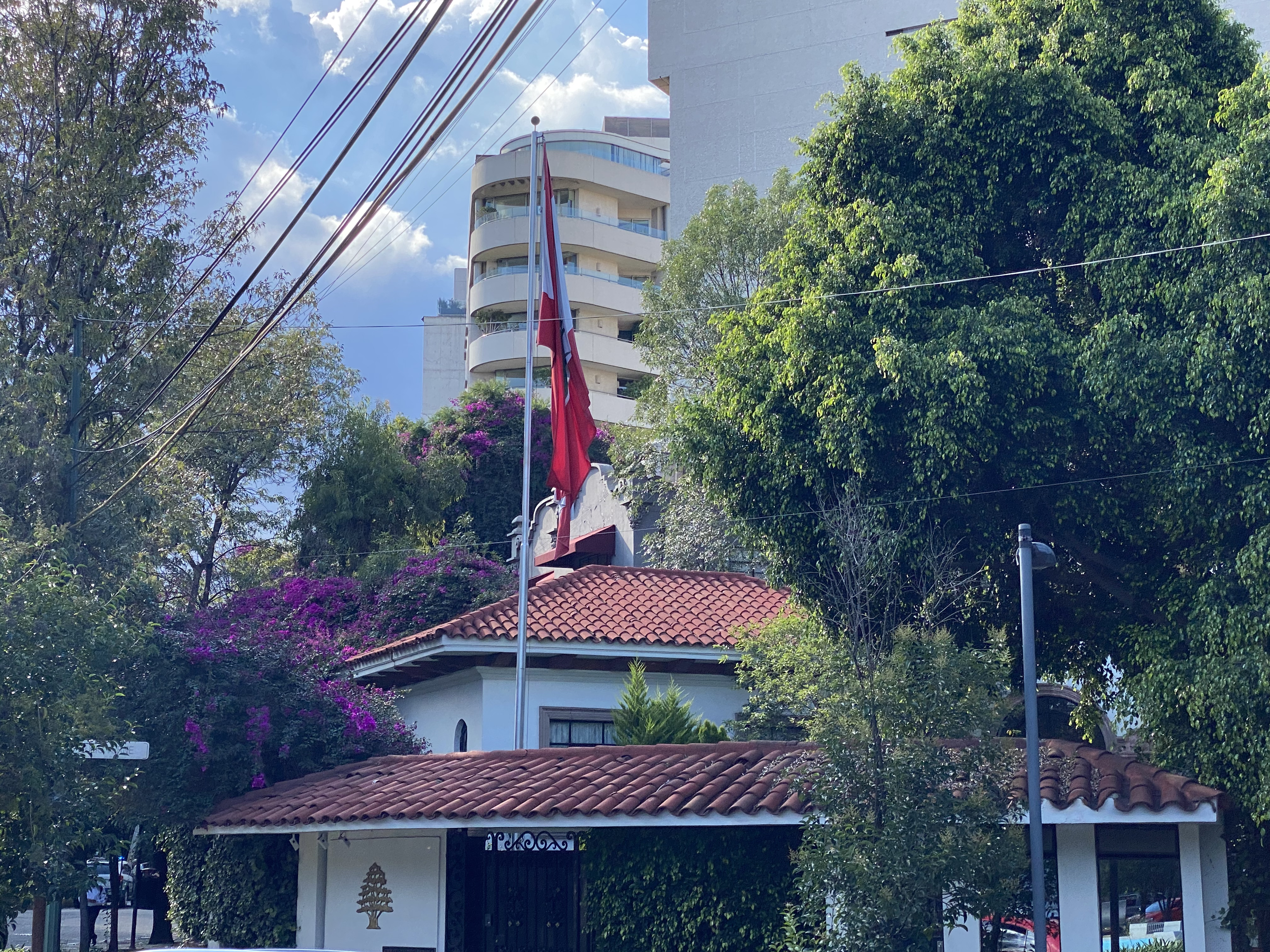
Embassy in Mexico City

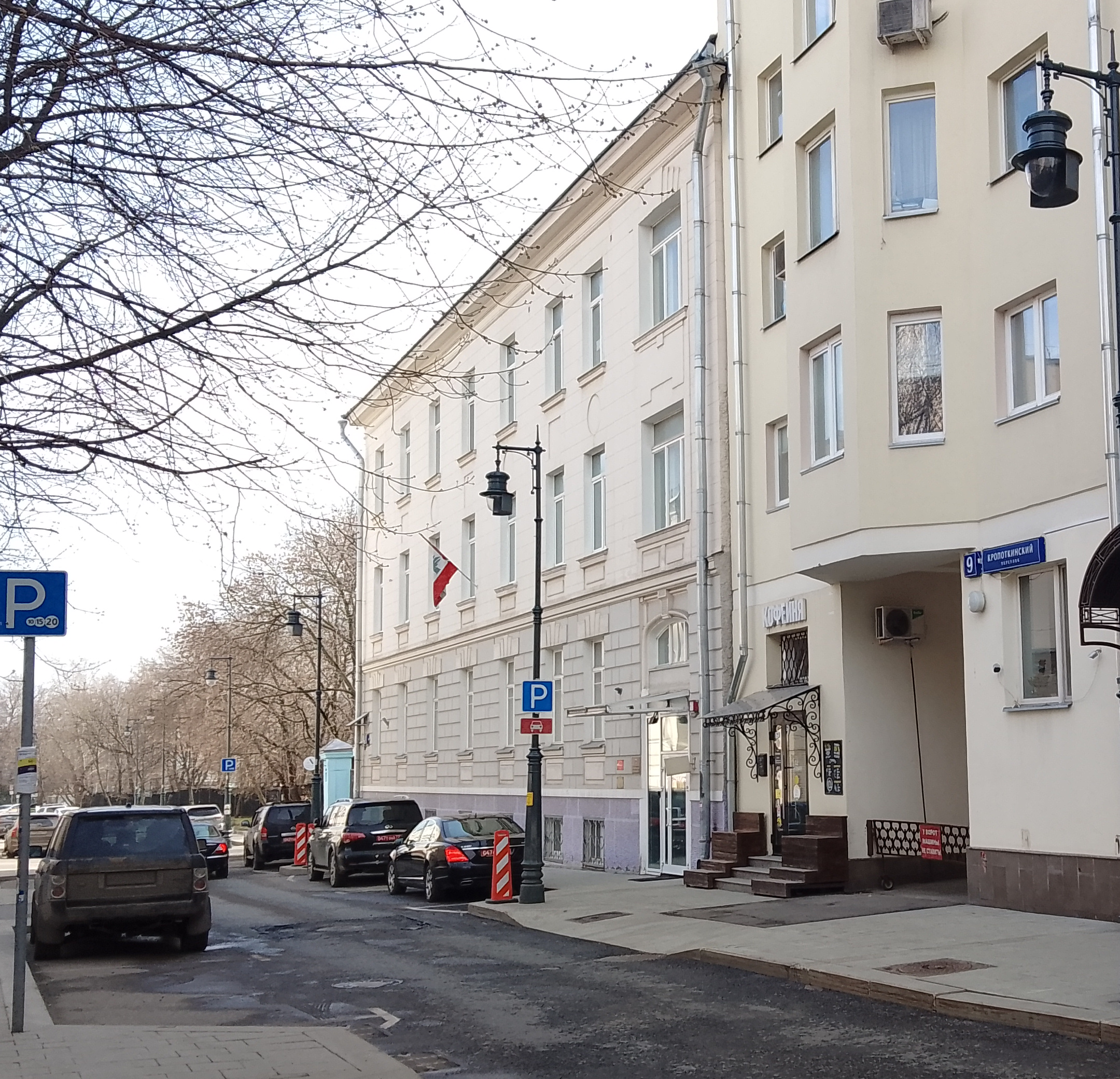
Embassy in Moscow

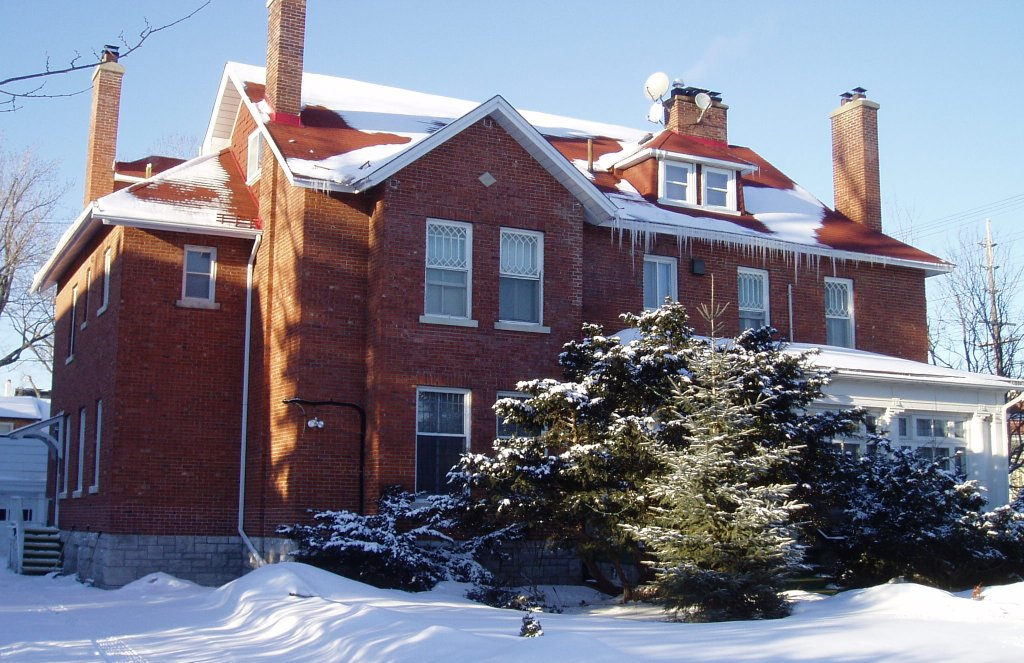
Embassy in Ottawa

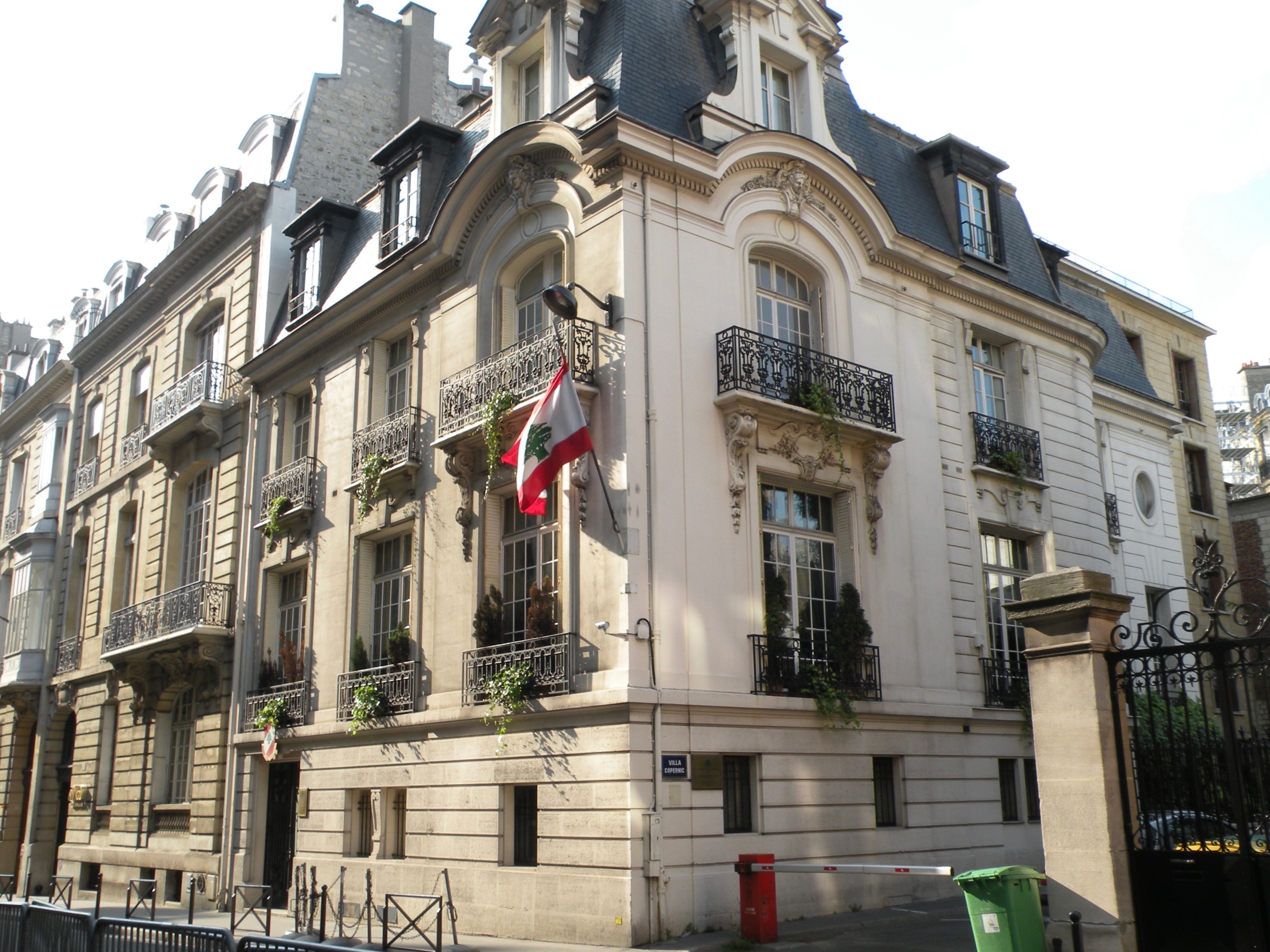
Embassy in Paris

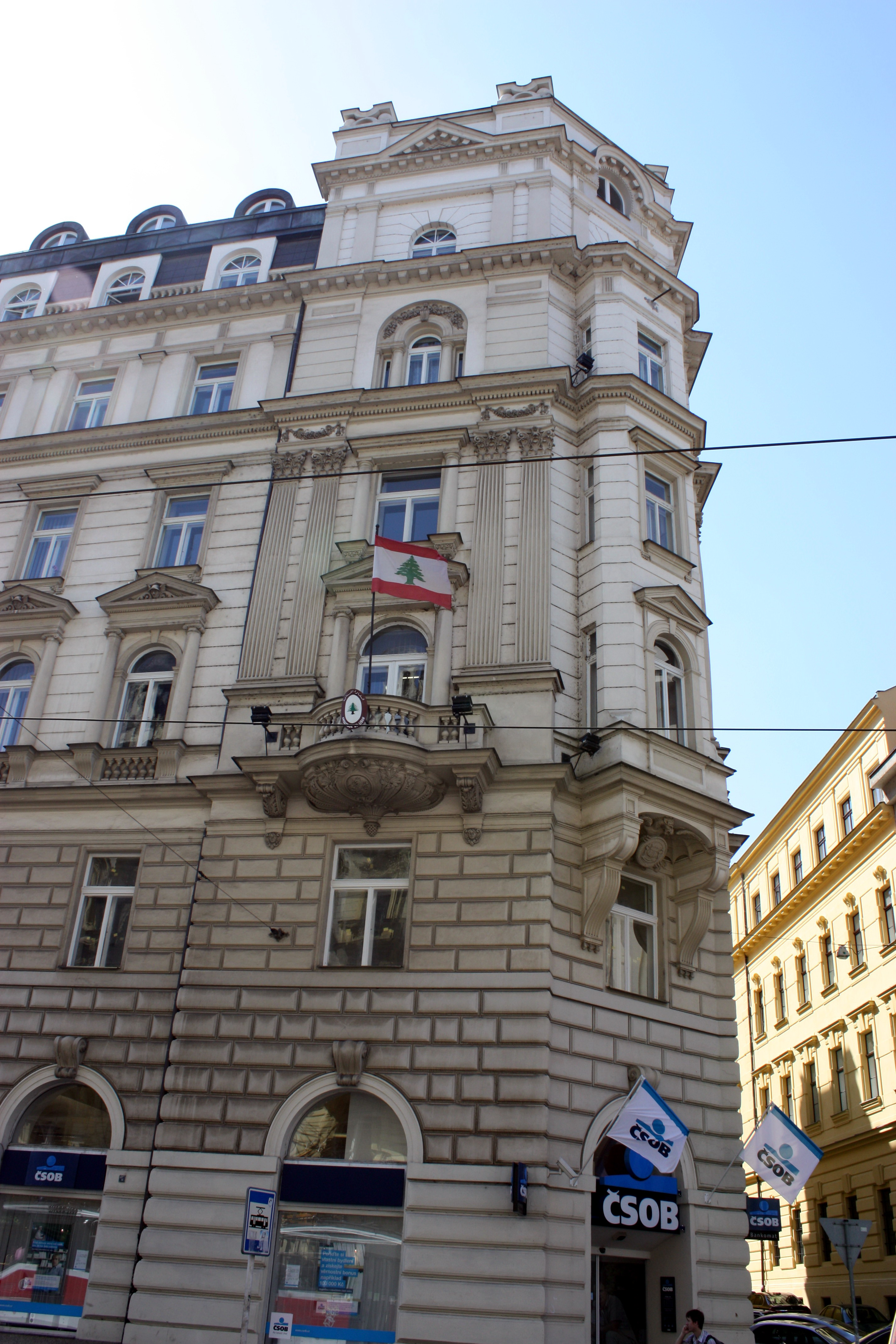
Embassy in Prague

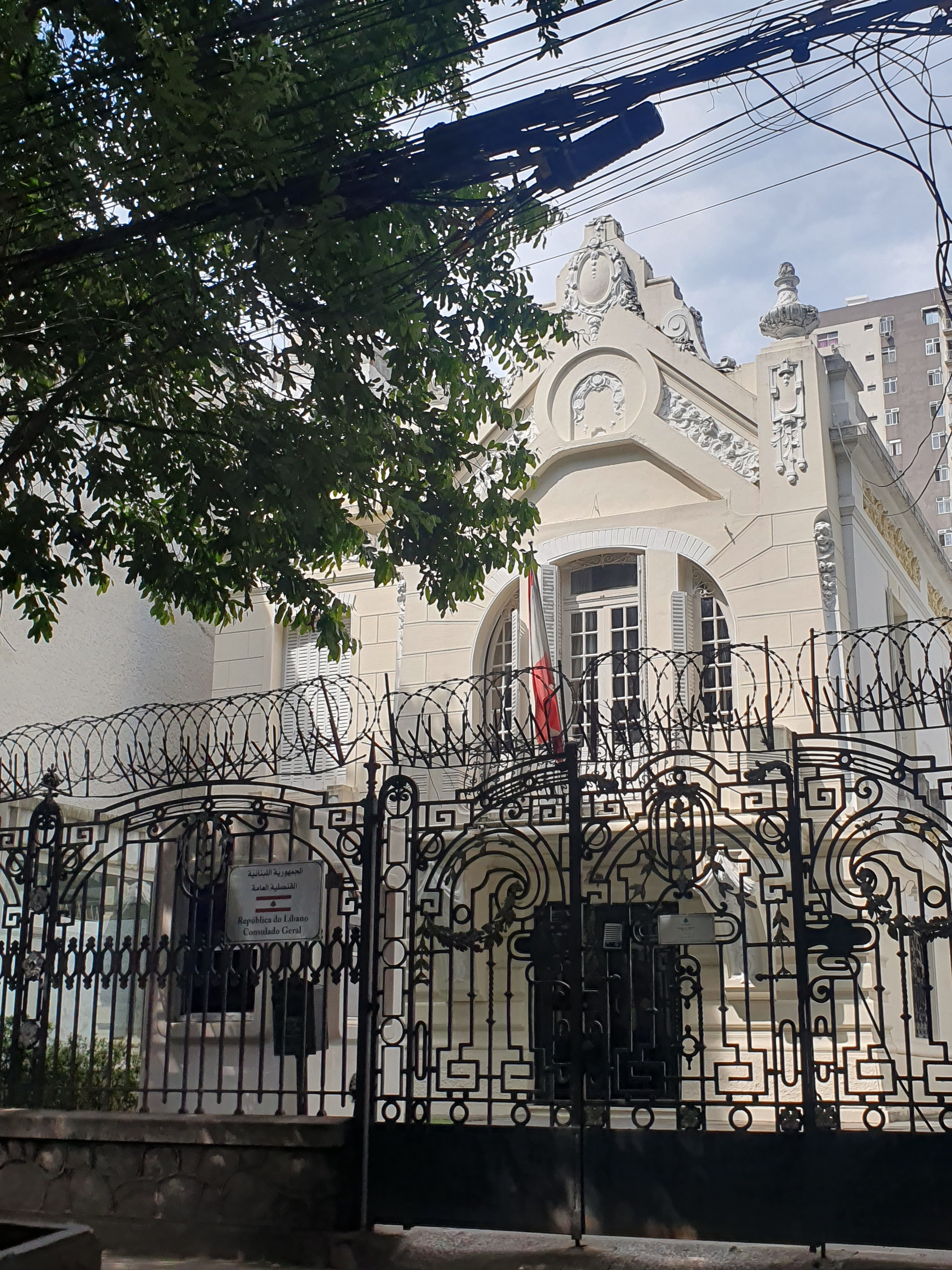
Consulate-General in Rio de Janeiro

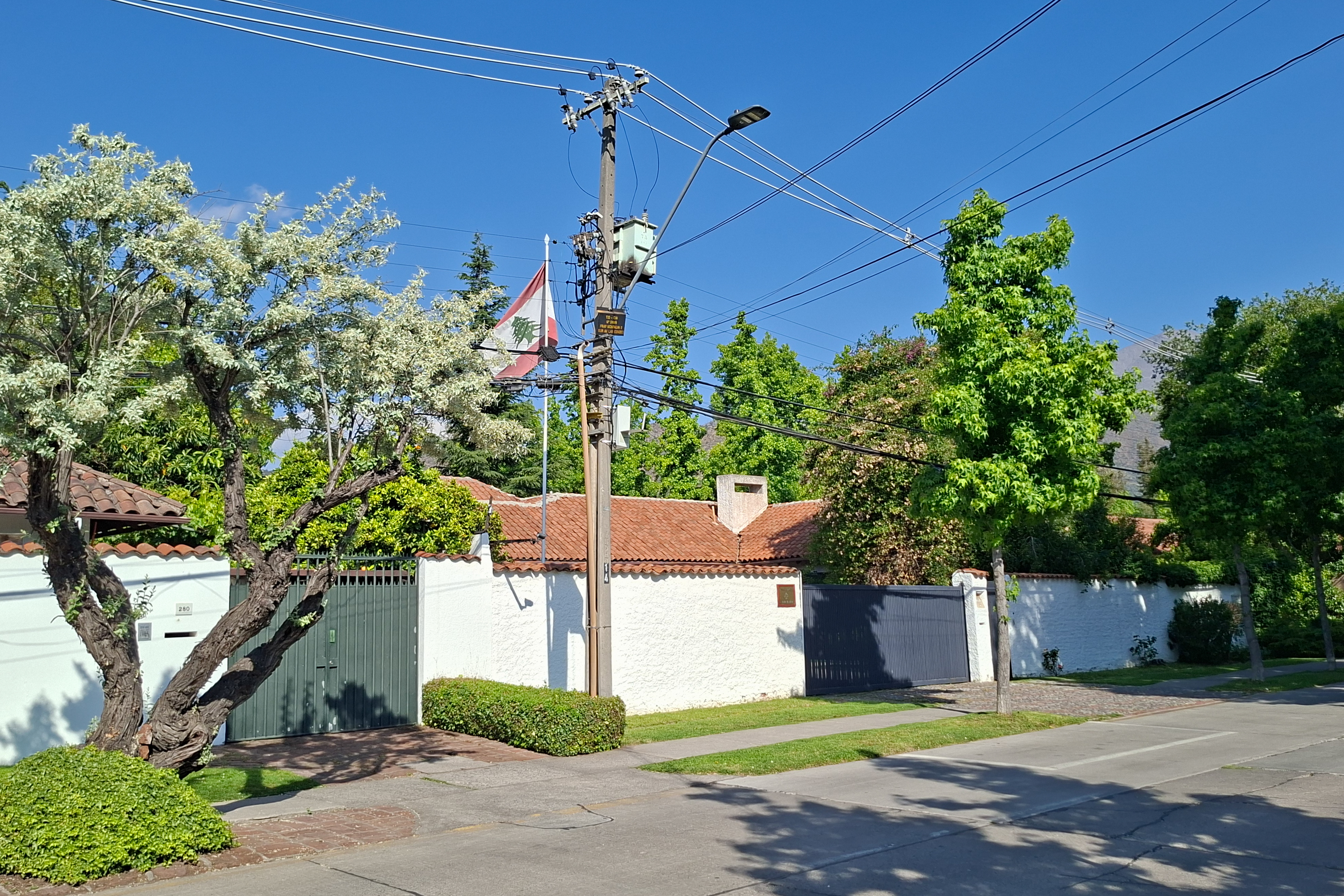
Embassy in Santiago

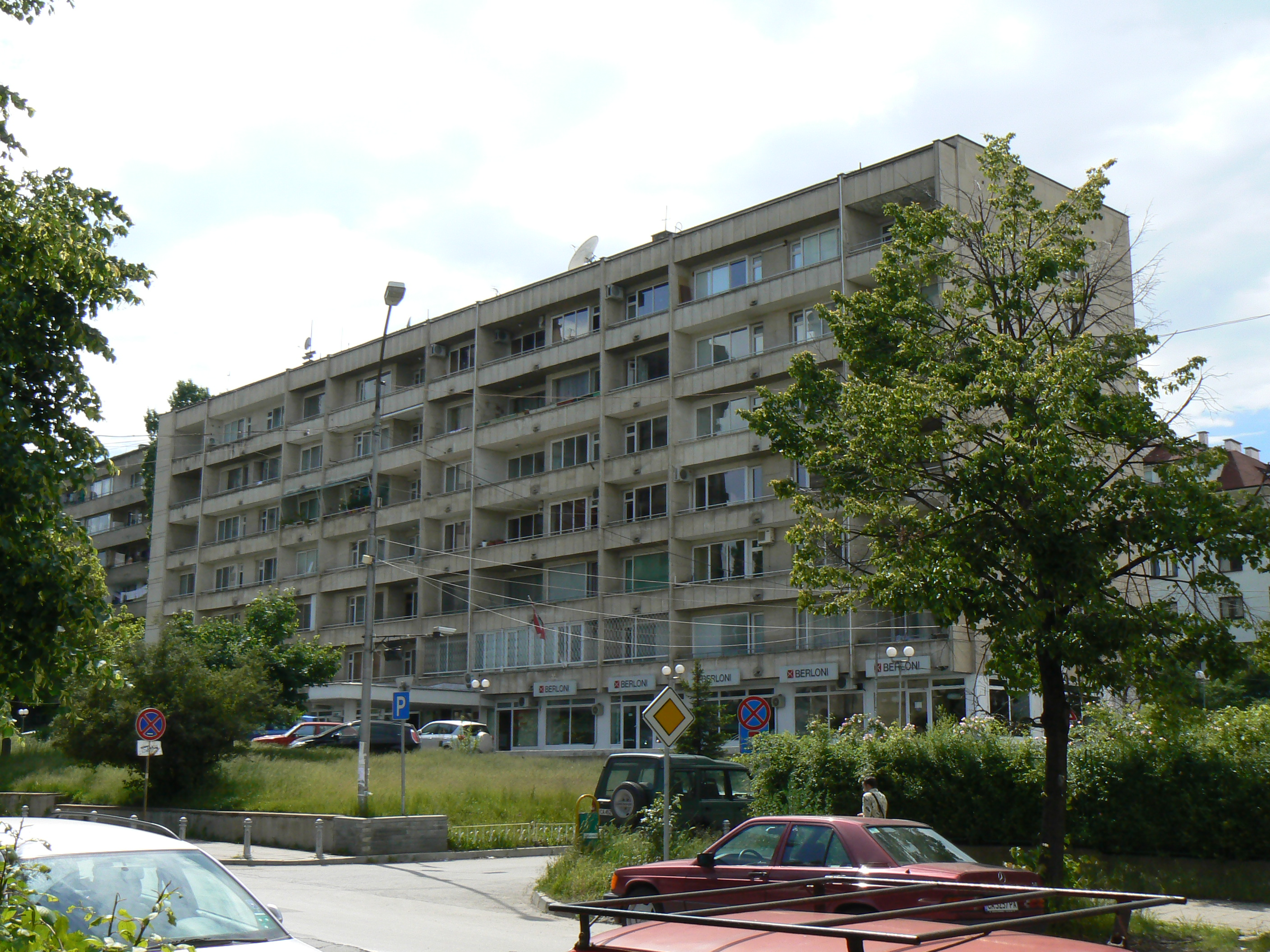
Embassy in Sofia

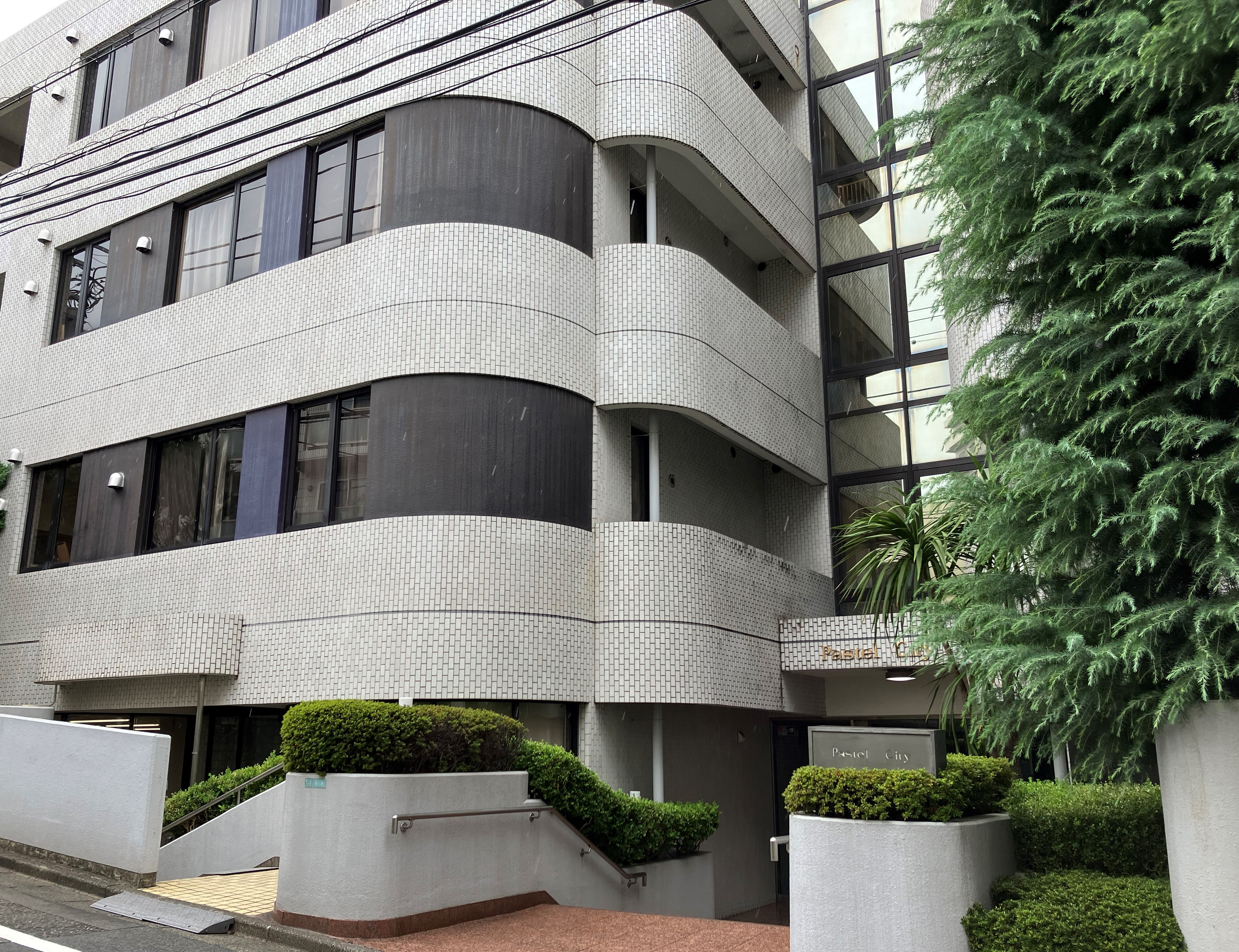
Embassy in Tokyo

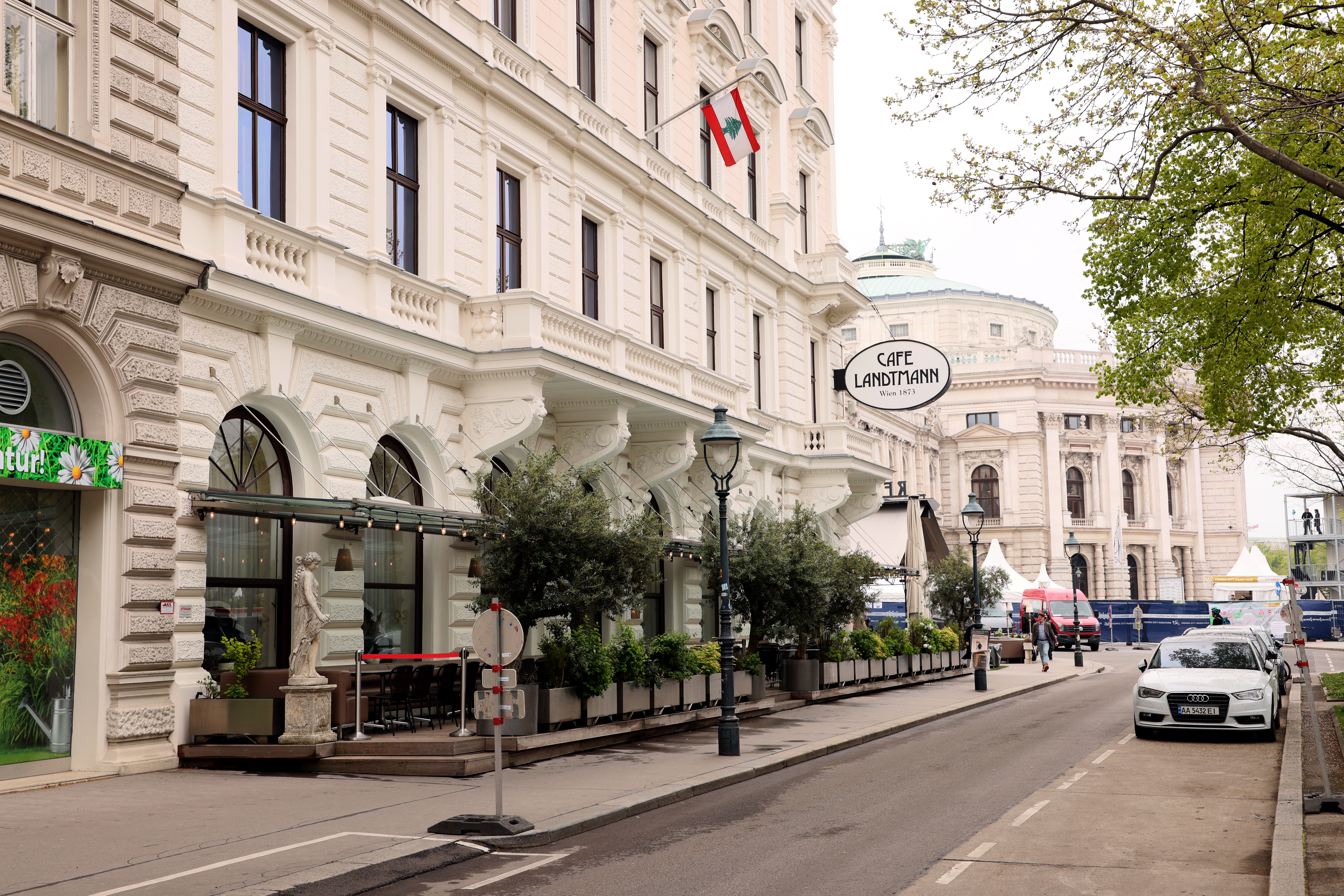
Embassy in Vienna

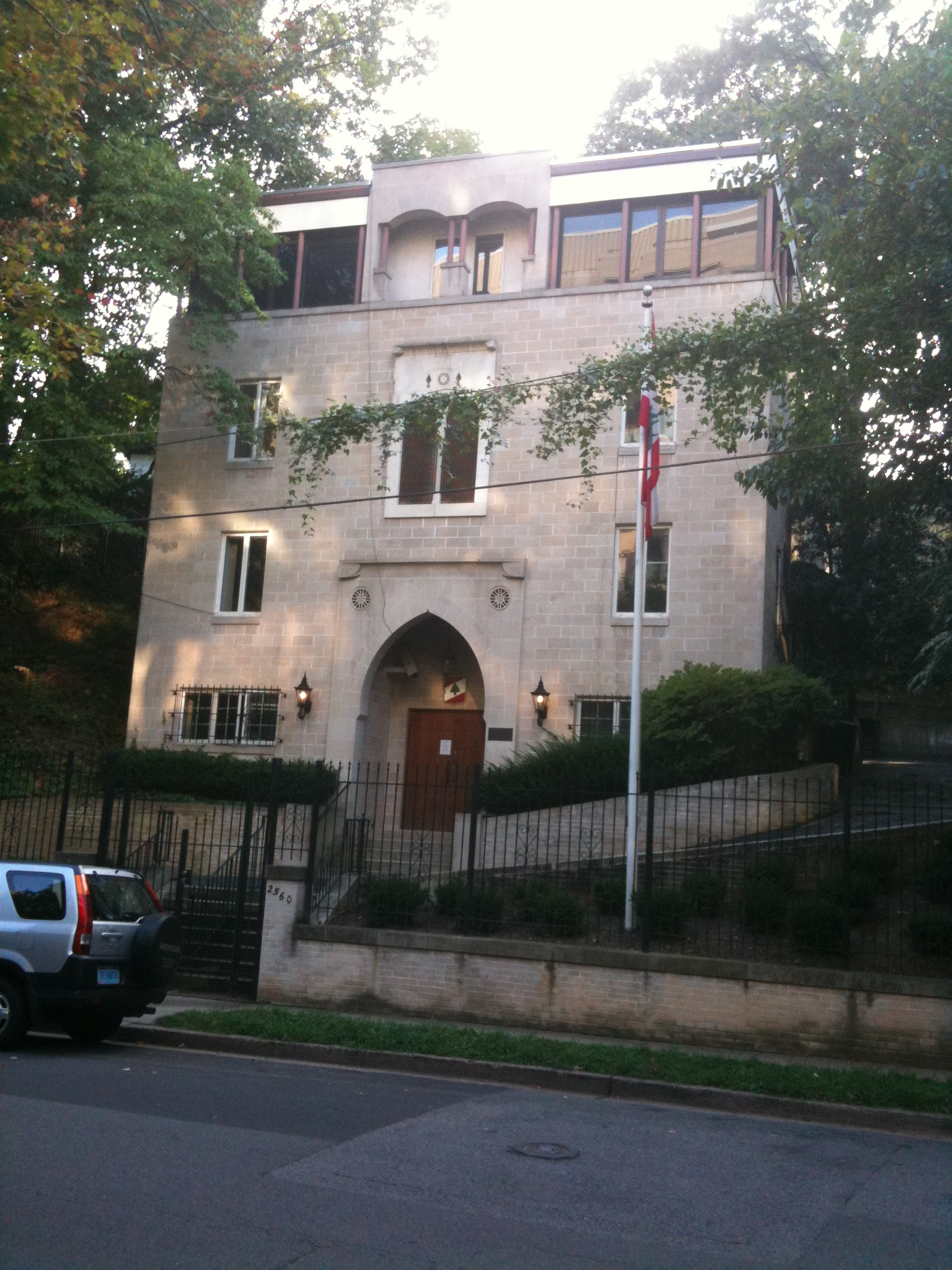
Embassy in Washington, D.C.

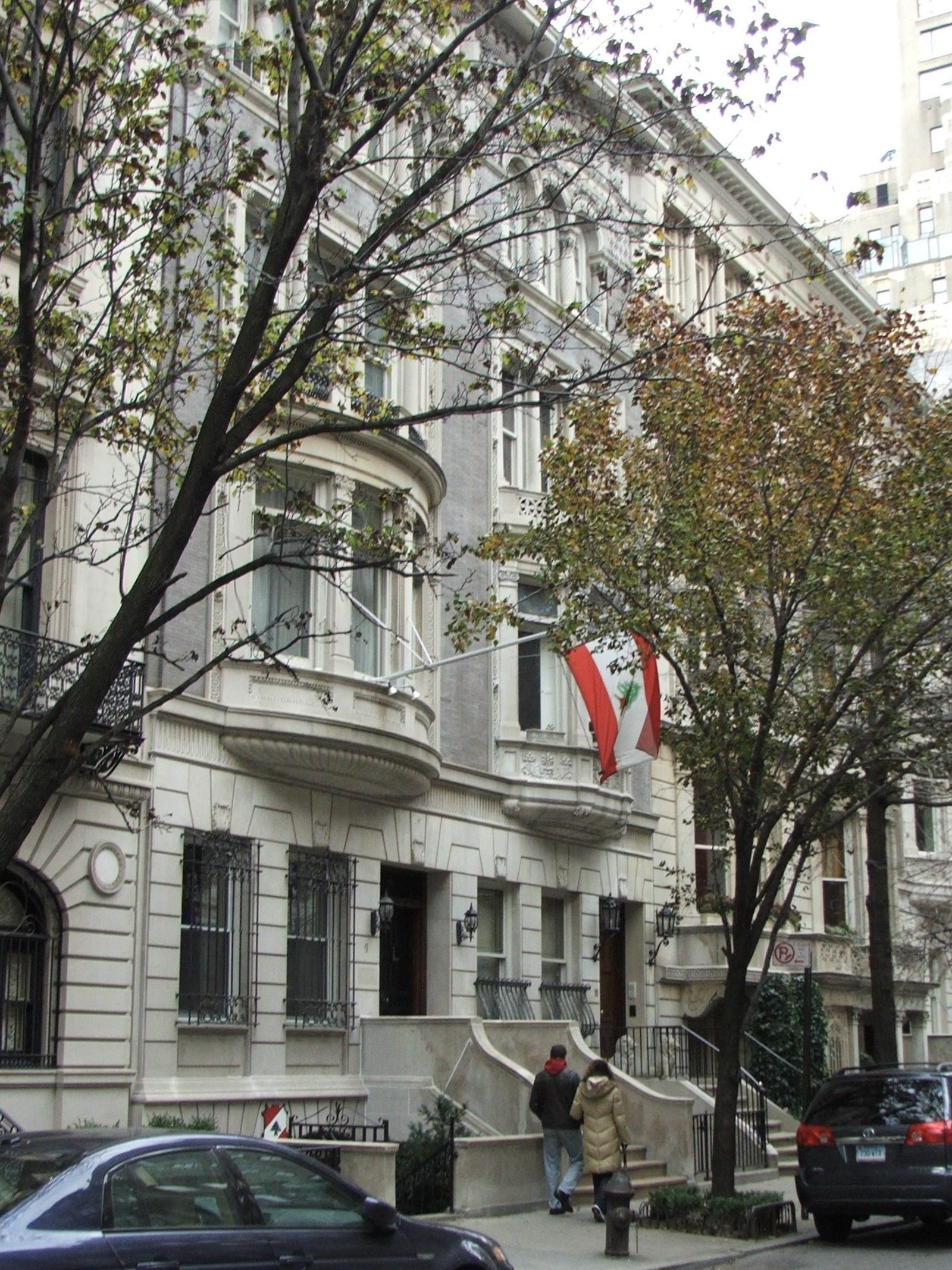
Consulate-General in New York City

== See also ==
- Foreign relations of Lebanon
- List of diplomatic missions in Lebanon
