= Lebanon–United Kingdom relations =

- Lebanon: United Kingdom

Diplomatic mission
- Embassy of Lebanon, London: Embassy of the United Kingdom, Beirut

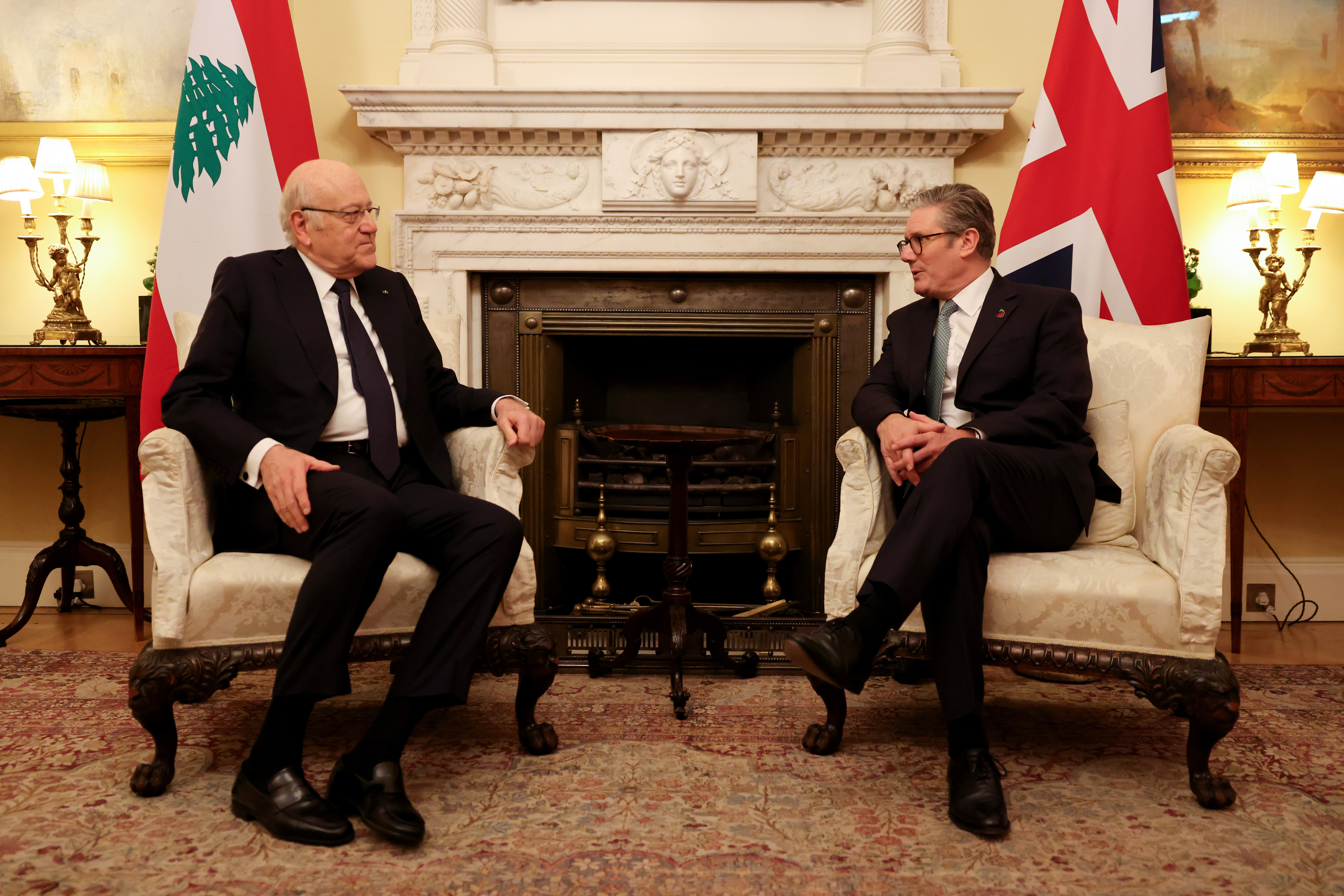
Lebanese Prime Minister Najib Mikati with British Prime Minister Keir Starmer in 10 Downing Street, October 2024.

Lebanon–United Kingdom relations are the bilateral relations between Lebanon and the United Kingdom. Bilaterally the two countries have an Association Agreement, and a Development Partnership.

== Economic relations ==
Lebanon–United Kingdom Association Agreement
Association Agreement between the United Kingdom of Great Britain and Northern Ireland, of the one part, and the Lebanese Republic, of the other part
- Type: Free trade agreement
- Context: Trade continuity agreement between Lebanon and the United Kingdom
- Signed: 19 September 2019
- Location: London, England, United Kingdom
- Effective: 1 January 2021
- Negotiators: Bou Habib; Ian Collard
- Parties: Lebanon; United Kingdom
- Language: Arabic; English

From 1 March 2003 until 30 December 2020, trade between Lebanon and the UK was governed by the European Communities–Lebanon Euro-Mediterranean Association Agreement, while the United Kingdom was a member of the European Union.

Following the withdrawal of the United Kingdom from the European Union, the UK and Lebanon signed the Lebanon–United Kingdom Association Agreement on 19 September 2019. The Lebanon–United Kingdom Association Agreement is a continuity trade agreement, based on the EU free trade agreement, which entered into force on 1 January 2021. Trade value between Lebanon and the United Kingdom was worth £771 million in 2022.

== Political relations ==
Hamish Falconer, the UK's Deputy Foreign Secretary, reacted to the UN Security Council meeting on Lebanon, which took place on 2 June 2026. In a post on X, he stated that the United Kingdom welcomed the session. Falconer described the escalation of tensions in Lebanon as "unacceptable" and called on all parties to commit to a genuine and lasting ceasefire. He further emphasized that only a negotiated, diplomatic solution can lead to long-term peace and stability in the region.

== Diplomatic missions ==
- Lebanon maintains an embassy in London.
- The UK has an embassy in Beirut.

== See also ==
- Foreign relations of Lebanon
- Foreign relations of the United Kingdom
