= Embassy of Lebanon, London =

Diplomatic mission of Lebanon in the United Kingdom

Embassy of Lebanon in London
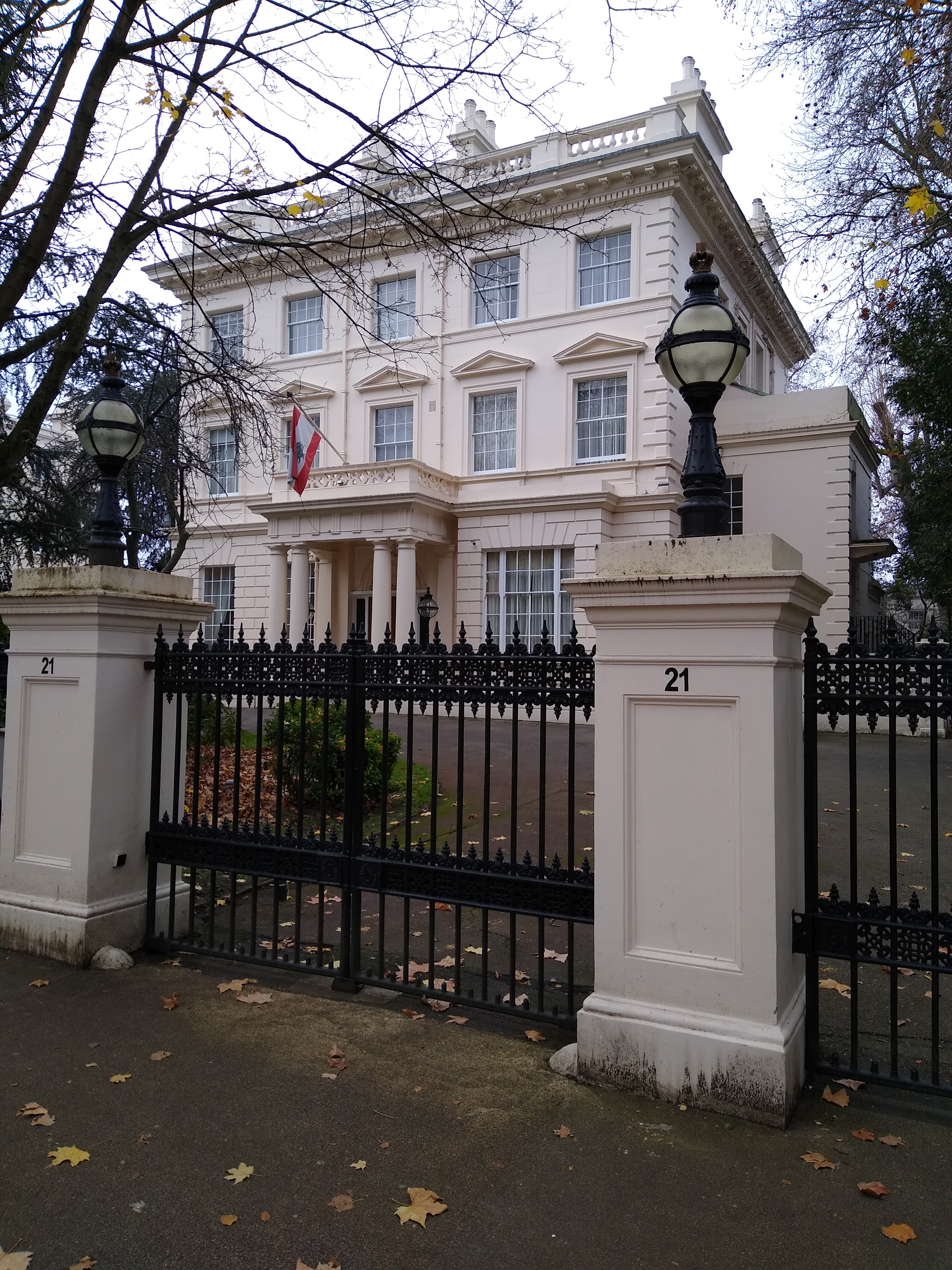
- Location: Holland Park, London
- Address: 21 Kensington Palace Gardens, London, W8 4QN
- Coordinates: 51°30′29.3″N 0°11′31.5″W
- Ambassador: Rami Mortada

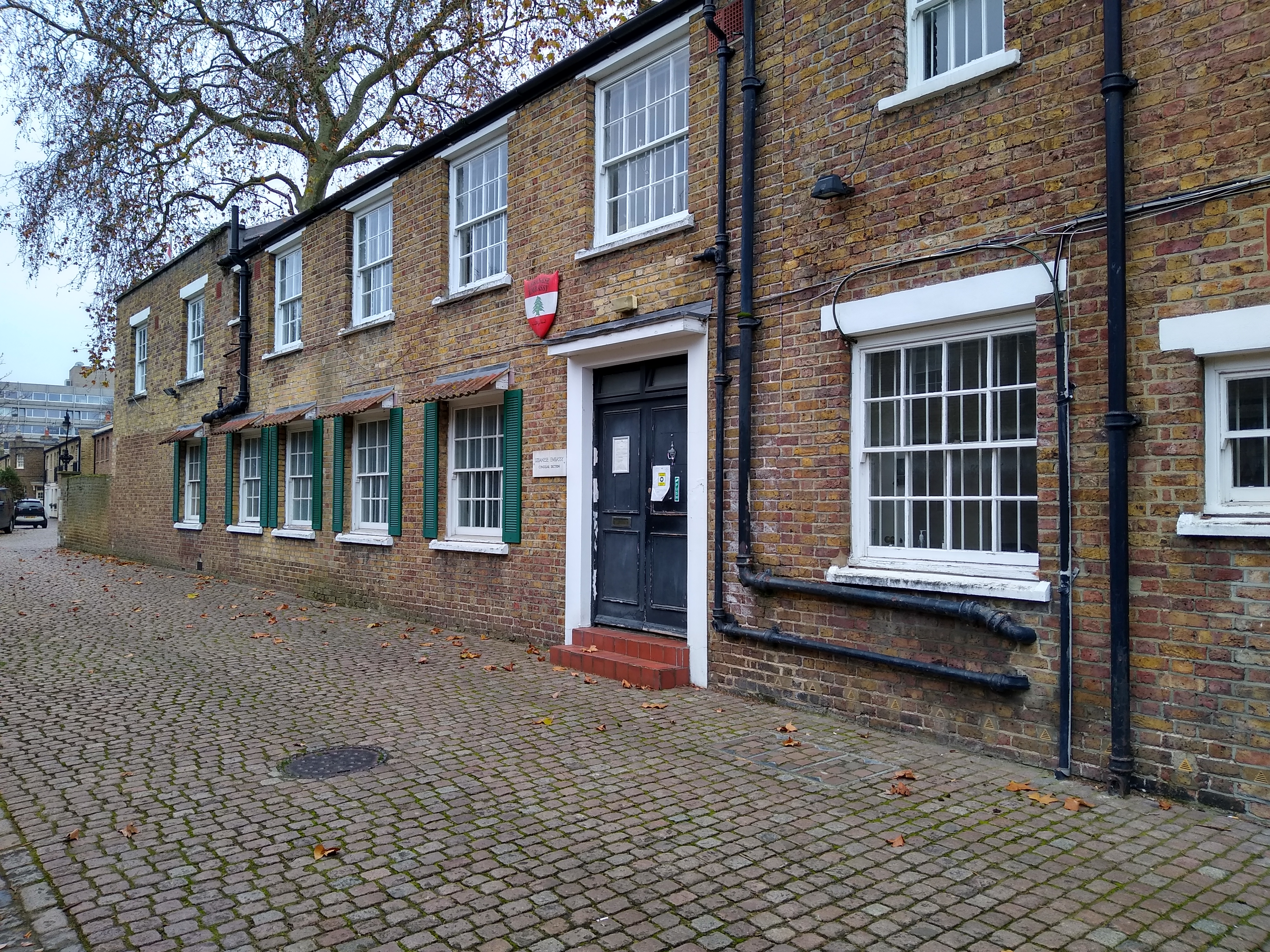
Consular section

The Embassy of Lebanon in London is the diplomatic mission of Lebanon in the United Kingdom.

The embassy is situated on Kensington Palace Gardens and was built in 1845-46 by Charles Frederick Oldfield and is a Grade II listed building.
