= Hans Rothfels =

German historian (1891–1976)

- Born: 12 April 1891; Kassel, German Empire
- Died: 22 June 1976 (aged 85); Tübingen, West Germany
- Scientific career
- Fields: History
- Workplaces: University of Königsberg
- Doctoral students: Karl Heinz Bremer (1934); Gerhard Weinberg (1951) Hans Mommsen (1959); Heinrich August Winkler (1963)

Hans Rothfels (12 April 1891 – 22 June 1976) was a German historian. He supported an idea of authoritarian German state, dominance of Germany over Europe and was hostile to Germany's eastern neighbours. After his applications for honorary Aryan status were rejected, due to his Jewish ancestry and increased persecution of Jewish people by Nazis, he was forced to emigrate to the United Kingdom and later to the United States during the Second World War, after which he became opposed to the Nazi regime. Rothfels returned to West Germany after 1945 where he continued to influence history teaching and became an influential figure among West German scholars.

Rothfels was instrumental in his historiographical contributions on the field of Zeitgeschichte, i.e. the study of contemporary history.

== Biography ==
Rothfels was born to a wealthy Jewish family in Kassel, Hesse-Nassau. In 1910, he converted to Lutheranism. He was studying history and philosophy at Heidelberg University when World War I broke out in 1914. As a student, Rothfels had been a leading pupil of Friedrich Meinecke. Rothfels served in the German Army as a reserve officer and was badly wounded near Soissons. He lost one of his legs and was in a hospital until 1917. In 1918, Rothfels's dissertation on Carl von Clausewitz, "Carl von Clausewitz: Politik und Krieg", led to Heidelberg granting him a degree in history. In 1920, Rothfels's dissertation was published as a book. In 1922, he edited and published a collection of Clausewitz's private letters. In addition, Rothfels published several collections of Otto von Bismarck's letters, and was the first historian to be authorized by the Bismarck family to publish the Iron Chancellor's correspondence. Rothfels was noted for his claim that Bismarck was neither the "iron chancellor" of "banal legend" nor an "opportunist", but rather a profoundly religious man struggling to deal with a reality whose full complexity was only understandable to God. He defended Bismarck's Germanization policies against Poles claiming they were "defensive".

Between 1924 and 1926, Rothfels taught at the University of Berlin. From 1926 to 1934, he worked as a professor, holding the Chair of History at the University of Königsberg. During his time in Königsberg, he was well known for his highly nationalistic interpretation of German history. A reactionary in his politics, Rothfels was hostile towards the Weimar Republic, through combination of authoritarianism and mass national movement, he hoped, it would be destroyed, and connections with Western democracies broken, and envisioned that on ruins of this state a new Reich would emerged formed out of East Prussian Baltic Northeast and Southeastern outposts of former Habsburg Empire. In foreign affairs, he often denounced the Treaty of Versailles and the eastern borders it had imposed on Germany. Rothfels advocated German domination of Eastern Europe and making its population into serfs. As a historian, his major interests were Otto von Bismarck, Clausewitz, and later on, the conservative German opposition to Adolf Hitler. A major interest of Rothfels in the 1920s was his belief in the obsolescence of the nation-state, and the need for a "loosening up" of the Versailles borders through increased protection of minorities. Rothfels promoted an idea of race classification based on readiness of non-German ethnic groups in Eastern Europe to submit themselves to rule of German Third Reich. The Eastern and Southeastern nationalities were to be "restructured" and integrated with German "master race". Non-Germans would have been subject to hierarchical employment conditions and essentially have status of indentured workers, based on racist criteria. Those living outside the "German sphere" were to be classified by hierarchy based on their "cultural heritage" and ruled under direction of Germans and a vassal class that would collaborate with them.

Although supportive of right-wing politics (according to some, he might have voted for Hitler in 1932), he was subject to increasing persecution, being Jewish by birth. Eventually, Rothfels was forced to leave his university position due to his Jewish ancestry, despite intervention by Hermann Rauschning, the Nazi president of Danzig Senate, and Theodor Oberlander, director of League of German East (Bund der Deutschen Osten) and NSDAP's East Prussian intelligence agency, and was forbidden to teach a year later. While Rothfels tried to get an honorary Aryan status with support by Joachim von Ribbentrop, his efforts were fruitless. Subjected to increasing persecution and discrimination by the State, he reluctantly left Germany in 1938 for the United Kingdom. What decided the issue for him was his experience during the Kristallnacht pogrom when his house was looted and trashed by the SA and he himself was arrested and held by the Gestapo for several hours, during which he was deprived of his crutches and beaten up. Together with his wife and their three children, Rothfels left for the United Kingdom, where he hastily began to learn English, a language that he subsequently mastered.

=== Exile ===
After teaching at St. John's College, Oxford from 1938 to 1940, Rothfels was interned on the Isle of Man. During this time, his only known publication was an essay from 1940 in which he discussed Soviet and German interaction in the Baltics. Rothfels defended German hegemony over this "outpost of Western Europe and Western civilization" and complained about resettlement of Germans there due to Soviet-Nazi treaties. Rothfels left for the United States, where he stayed until 1951, and took U.S. citizenship. He taught at Brown University in Providence, Rhode Island and at the University of Chicago in Chicago, Illinois where he became a professor. Considering his views at that time, a Jewish-German student was surprised that Rothfels was forced to leave Germany in the first place. During his time in the United States, he befriended the American publisher Henry Regnery and became actively involved in the Republican Party.

In an essay published in 1943, in the book The Makers of Modern Strategy on Clausewitz, has been praised by Michael Howard as the first serious essay ever published on Clausewitz in English. In his essay, Rothfels argued that Clausewitz's military theories were more sophisticated than the "Mahdi of Mass" interpretation of Clausewitz that had been popularized by such historians as Sir Basil Liddell Hart. Rothfels argued that it was inappropriate to view Clausewitz in the context of later events; instead Rothfels insisted on understanding Clausewitz and his theory of war in the context of the Napoleonic Wars and on understanding the Clausewitz the man as the key to understanding Clausewitz the military thinker. Rothfels maintained Clausewitz's personality, social background, war experience, and his schooling all needed to be understood to properly appreciate his theories about war. Most notably, Rothfels portrayed Clausewitz as a man under considerable psychological strain caused by his commoner background in the largely aristocratic Prussian Army. Through Rothfels contended that aspects of Vom Krieg were outdated due to advances in military technology and tactics, nonetheless, Rothfels felt that Clausewitz was the most important military philosopher of all time. The U.S. military historian Peter Paret has differed with some of Rothfels's interpretation of Clausewitz, but acknowledged Rothfels as a major influence on his work on Clausewitz.

In 1948, Rothfels published his most famous book, The German Opposition To Hitler, which celebrated those conservatives who attempted the 20 July plot of 1944, which was based upon a lecture given at the University of Chicago in 1947. Rothfels, who remained a steadfast German nationalist all his life, saw the conspirators against the National Socialist regime as representative of all that was best about German life and argued that the actions of the conspirators had restored Germany's honour from the disgrace the Nazis had brought upon it. Rothfels accepted Edmund Burke's idea that the best defenders of liberty come from the upper crust of society and cast the men and women of 20 July as a perfect example of Burke's theory. Rothfels claimed that the German opposition was motivated by the highest possible ethical and moral considerations, and asserted that there were no self-interested motives whatsoever amongst the men and women of the 20 July. Rothfels argued that the actions of the 20 July conspirators were motivated a sense of noblesse oblige, devotion to the principles of Christianity and the highest form of patriotism. Rothfels was fond of pointing out the difficulties involved in attempting to overthrow one's government in war-time, which in Rothfels view, was a sign of the true patriotism of the 20 July conspirators.

Rothfels saw Nazism as a type of totalitarianism, and often argued that there was no moral difference between Nazi Germany and the Soviet Union; in his view, the Cold War was merely a continuation of the struggle between what he called the "conservative freedom movement" and totalitarian forces. In particular, Rothfels was opposed to any sort of Sonderweg interpretation of German history, and argued that Nazism was the result of the general problems of modern civilization, which Rothfels saw as based on a set of values that were overtly materialistic, secular, and dehumanizing, and which had reduced most people to a mindless mass. Rothfels wrote "In many respects, Nationals can be considered as the final summit of an extreme consequence of the secularization movement of the nineteenth century". In Rothfels's view, the values of modern mass civilization had led most people to forget the fundamental values of the West, which in his opinion were based on respect for God and the individual. Rothfels argued that "Modern mass civilization generates a reservoir of evil forces whose release spells barbarism...What triumphed after the pseudo-legal revolution of 1933 was in fact and to a great extent the dark forces forming the sedimment of every modern society". Rothfels argued that the Nazis came to power as a result of a series of unfortunate developments that had occurred in Germany after World War I such as the Great Inflation of 1923 and the Great Depression, and often criticized those in his view promoted the view that sought to equate Deutschum with Nazism such as Sir Lewis Bernstein Namier, William L. Shirer, A.J.P. Taylor and Sir John Wheeler-Bennett. Moreover, far from Nazism being rooted in German traditions, Rothfels claimed that the strongest opposition to Nazism came from those grounded in traditional values. In Rothfels's opinion, "the traditions of a genuine 'Prussian militarism'" provided the principle "bulwark against nationalistic and demagogic excesses". The German Opposition to Hitler ended with a call for people all over the West to embrace what Rothfels regarded as the noble ideas of the conservative opponents of Nazism, which Rothfels saw as leading to back to the higher values of the West.

The German Opposition To Hitler was a controversial book because Rothfels focused his attention largely on anti-Nazis on the Right and for the most part ignored anti-Nazis on the Left. In addition, many felt that the book was a hagiographical treatment of anti-Nazi conservatives. His motive in writing the book was in part to prevent the emergence of a new stab-in-the-back legend that might once again undermine democracy in Germany. He was dismayed by public opinion polls taken immediately after World War II in the American zone of occupation that showed the majority of Germans had a low opinion of the men and women involved in the 20 July plot. Rothfels was determined that Germans should see them as heroes, not villains.

=== Return to Germany ===
In 1951, Rothfels returned to West Germany, where he taught at the University of Tübingen. He worked hard for the rest of his life to exonerate German nationalism from the taint of Nazism. Upon his return to Germany, Rothfels founded the Institut für Zeitgeschichte (Institute for Contemporary History), an historical study center devoted to the Nazi period. The institute's journal, the Vierteljahrshefte für Zeitgeschichte (Journal for Contemporary History) has become one of the world's leading periodicals for the study of Nazi Germany. Within a few years, the Vierteljahrshefte für Zeitgeschichte had the highest circulation of any historical journal in West Germany. During the 1950s, Rothfels was one of the few German historians who attempted a serious examination of the Holocaust, which was a subject that most German historians preferred to ignore during that decade. In particular, he broke new ground by publishing Kurt Gerstein's reports relating to the Final Solution in the first edition of the Vierteljahrshefte für Zeitgeschichte in 1953 and another article in 1959 that examined the plight of Polish Jewry under Nazi rule. In his works Rothfels aimed at minimising the German hostility to Jews, while highlighting any attempts to save them by German individuals. Crimes and support for anti-semitism were downplayed, and opposition to racial discrimination portrayed by Rothfels as dominant. As such his text produced a vision of history in which for example the 1930s were virtually absent from anti-semitism, and non-Jewish Germans were completely willing to help Jews.

After his return to Germany, Rothfels was a pioneer of contemporary history, the study of the "epoch of those who lived at the time" to use Rothfels's words. In Rothfels's view, contemporary history was the study of the recent past, where despite or rather because the lack of documentation caused by studying events so close to the past and the challenge of writing about events that one experienced oneself, required special patience, skill and ability of the part of the historian. In particular, Rothfels called for historians working in the field of contemporary history to approach matters in an objective and neutral matter while keeping in mind the moral questions. In practice, contemporary history came to refer history from 1914 on.

After his return to Germany, Rothfels took a strong stand against those whose work he felt could exonerate the Nazis. In 1954, he and one of his star pupils from the University of Chicago, Gerhard Weinberg had a renowned debate on the pages of Vierteljahrshefte für Zeitgeschichte with Andreas Hillgruber and Hans-Günther Seraphim over the issue of whether the German invasion of the Soviet Union in 1941 had been a "preventive war" forced on Adolf Hitler by the possibility of Soviet attack on Germany. Hillgruber and Seraphim argued for the "preventive war" thesis while Rothfels and Weinberg opposed it, arguing that it was Nazi racial theories that were the origins of the German invasion of the Soviet Union. The majority opinion was that Rothfels and Weinberg destroyed Seraphim's and Hillgruber's arguments. Indeed, Hillgruber himself did a volte-face and renounced his former thesis as mistaken. Later, in 1961, Rothfels took a strong stand against the American neo-Nazi historian David Hoggan who claimed that the outbreak of war in 1939 had been due to an Anglo-Polish conspiracy against Germany. Also in 1961, Rothfels assisted Weinberg with the publication of Adolf Hitler's Zweites Buch which Weinberg had discovered in 1958, and for which Rothfels wrote the introduction.

Another area of interest for Rothfels was the expulsion of the ethnic German population from Eastern Europe after World War II. In the 1950s, Rothfels worked with Theodor Schieder, Werner Conze and other historians to produce the multi-volume Documentation of the Expulsion of Germans from East Central Europe. Many later prominent historians such as Martin Broszat, Hans-Ulrich Wehler and Hans Mommsen were involved in this project.

== Controversy ==
In his lifetime and since his death, Rothfels has been a very controversial figure. Many see him as apologist for the anti-democratic German Right, and in particular, his attitude towards the Weimar Republic has recently been the subject of controversy in Germany. The historian Ingo Haar in his 2000 book Historiker im Nationalsozialismus called Rothfels an enemy of the Weimar Republic and a Nazi sympathizer. The historian Heinrich August Winkler has strongly criticized Haar, who had erroneously used a radio address Rothfels gave in 1930 praising Friedrich Ebert, Gustav Stresemann, and Paul von Hindenburg as great German leaders as a proof for Rothfels' support of Hitler. While Haar had implied the speech dates from 1933 and was addressed to Hitler after he took over power in Germany, Winkler verified the actual circumstances of the speech, which Rothfels repeated several times prior to 1933. Rothfels's critics contend that his planned 1933 radio address was too little, too late.

Rothfels and his inner circle at Königsberg in the early 1930s are often referred to as the Königsberg circle (German: Königsberger Kreis). Its most prominent members, apart from Rothfels himself, were his students Theodor Schieder and Werner Conze. Whereas Rothfels had to emigrate, Schieder and Conze joined the NSDAP. They were active in the field of Ostforschung, where they supported ideas such as 'dejewfication' (German: Entjudung). After Rothfels' return the three became leading figures among the historians of the newly founded West Germany. They soon found themselves together in a commission led by Schieder that was set up by the government for documenting the expulsion of Germans after World War II. In 1998, the 42nd Deutscher Historikertag marked the beginning of a public debate among German historians about the "brown history" of their field.

== Works ==
- Carl von Clausewitz: Politik und Krieg, Dümmlers Verlag, Berlin, 1920.
- Bismarck Und Der Staat; Ausgewählte Dokumente. Eingeleitet Von Hans Rothfels, Stuttgart, Kohlhammer Verlag, 1925.
- "Clausewitz" pages 93–113 from The Makers of Modern Strategy edited by Edward Mead Earle, Gordon A. Craig & Felix Gilbert, Princeton, N.J.: Princeton University Press, 1943.
- "The Baltic Provinces: Some Historic Aspects and Perspectives." Pages 117–146, Journal of Central European Affairs, Vol. IV, July 1944.
- "1848 – One Hundred Years After," Journal of Modern History, Vol. 20, No. 4 (December 1948)
- The German Opposition to Hitler, An Appraisal Henry Regnery Company, Chicago, Illinois, 1948; published in Germany as Die deutsche Opposition gegen Hitler Scherpe, Krefeld, 1949, revised editions 1961 & 1963.
- Review of Die Entscheidung des Abendlandes by Rudolf Rocker" pages 839–841 from American Historical Review, Volume 56, Issue #4, July 1951.
- "Zeitgeschichte als Aufgabe" pages 1–8 from Vierteljahrshefte für Zeitgeschichte, Volume 1, 1953.
- Bismarck-Briefe. Ausgewählt Und Eingeleitet Von Hans Rothfels, Göttingen, Vandenhoeck & Ruprecht 1955.
- Das politische Vermächtnis des deutschen Widerstandes, Bonn: Bundeszentrale für Heimatdienst, 1956.
- "Die Roten Kämpfer Zur Geschichte einer linken Widerstandsgruppe" pages 438–460 from Vierteljahrshefte für Zeitgeschichte, Volume 7, 1959.
- "Zur „Umsiedlung" der Juden im Generalgouvernment", pages 333–336 from Vierteljahrshefte für Zeitgeschichte, Volume 7, 1959.
- Bismarck, der Osten und das Reich, Darmstadt: Wissenschaftliche Buchgesellschaft, 1960.
- Bismarck; Vorträge und Abhandlungen, Stuttgart, W. Kohlhammer 1970.

== Sources ==
- Bassford, Christopher Clausewitz in English: The Reception of Clausewitz in Britain and America, 1815–1945, New York: Oxford University Press, 1994.
- Aspekte deutscher Aussenpolitik im 20. Jahrhundert: Aufsatze Hans Rothfels zum Gedächtnis, edited by Wolfgang Benz & Hermann Graml, Deutsche Verlags-Anstalt, Stuttgart, 1976.
- Berg, Nicolas "Hidden Memory and Unspoken History: Hans Rothfels and the Postwar Restoration of Contemporary German History" from Leo Baeck Year Book XLIX 2004.
- Geschichte und Gegenwartsbewusstsein: Historische Betrachtungen und Unterschungen. Festschrift Für Hans Rothfels Zum 70. Geburtstag Dargebracht von Kollegen, Freunden und Schülern, edited by Waldemar Besson & Friedrich Hiller von Gaertringen, Vandenhoeck & Ruprecht: Göttingen, 1963.
- Fahlbusch, Haar (editor) German Scholars And Ethnic Cleansing 1920–1945, Berghahn Books, ISBN 978-1-57181-435-7
- Iggers, Georg G.. "The Decline of the Classical National Tradition of German Historiography" pages 382–412 from History and Theory, Volume 6, Issue # 3 1967.
- Iggers, Georg The German Conception of History, Middletown: Connecticut; Wesleyan University Press, 1968.
- Klemperer, Klemens von "Hans Rothfels, 1891–1976" pages 381–383 from Central European History, Volume IX, Issue # 4, December 1976.
- Lehmann, Hartmut & Sheehan, James (editors) An Interrupted Past: German-Speaking Refugee Historians in the United States after 1933 Washington, D.C.: German Historical Institute, 1991 ISBN 0-521-40326-X.
- Lehmann, Hartmut & Melton, James Van Horn (editors) Paths of Continuity: Central European Historiography from the 1930s to the 1950s, Washington, D.C.: German Historical Institute; Cambridge [England]; New York: Cambridge University Press, 1994 ISBN 0-521-45199-X.
- Mommsen, Hans "Rothfels, Hans" pages 307–308 from Great Historians of the Modern Age, edited by Lucian Boia, Westport, C.T.: Greenwood Press, 1991 ISBN 0-313-27328-6.
- Remak, Joachim Review of The German Opposition to Hitler an Assessment, pages 90–91 from The German Quarterly, Volume 36, Issue # 1 January 1963.
