= Werner Conze =

German historian (1910–1986)

Werner Conze (December 11, 1910 – April 1986) was a German historian. Georg Iggers refers to him as "one of the most important historians and mentors of the post-1945 generation of West German historians." Beginning in 1998, Conze's role during the Third Reich and his successful postwar career in spite of this became a subject of great controversy among German historians.

A student of the national conservative historian Hans Rothfels at the University of Königsberg, Conze began his career during the Nazi period, working on Ostforschung, specifically studying German language islands and agrarian society in Eastern Europe. Conze became a member of both the SA and the Nazi Party. His early writings evince völkisch and antisemitic ideas, including advocating for the purging of Jews from Eastern Europe by unspecified means.

After the war, Conze continued to work in academia, eventually becoming a professor at the University of Heidelberg. From 1956 to 1961, he was a member of the Schieder commission, which documented the expulsion of Germans from Eastern Europe at the end of the War in a way that skirted the issue of German atrocities. In the postwar years, Conze moved away from his earlier völkisch positions and became a major mentor of new historians between the 1950s and 1970s; he was one of the most significant advocates of social history. Through his work on the encyclopedia Geschichtliche Grundbegriffe, he was also important for the development of conceptual history. He served as rector of the University of Heidelberg from 1969 to 1970 and as chairman of the Deutscher Historikerverband from 1972-1976.

== Biography ==
=== Youth and studies ===
Werner Conze was born in 1910 in Amt Neuhaus. He was the grandson of Alexander Conze, an archaeologist and one of the chief excavators of Pergamon. In 1929 he began his studies at the University of Leipzig, initially in art history. Conze quickly changed his degree to history. That same year he joined a student society, the Deutsche Akademische Gildenschaft (DAG), which had völkisch and antisemitic ideals. As a member of the DAG, Conze became friends with Theodor Schieder, and also met Theodor Oberländer and Karl-Heinz Pfeffer. In 1931, Conze transferred to the University of Königsberg, where he began to study Slavic studies and Ostforschung in addition to history. Conze also studied at the Herder-Institut Riga in Riga. He was trained in the tradition of so-called Volksgeschichte, which concerned the history of ethnically defined groups of people. Conze joined the SA on May 10, 1933, the day of the Nazi book burnings.

In Königsberg, Conze was a doctoral student of Hans Rothfels, where he wrote his dissertation on the German linguistic island of Hirschenhof in Livonia (now Irši, Lithuania). His dissertation argued that Germans had a positive role in development of eastern Europe. Conze was Rothfels' last doctoral student, as Rothfels, a Jew who had converted to Christianity, was fired from the university the same year that Conze finished his dissertation. He was awarded his Ph.D. in 1934. An important influence on Conze's dissertation was the work of German Ostforscher Walter Kuhn.

=== Career in Nazi Germany ===
From 1934 to 1935, he did military service in an artillery regiment in Preussisch Eylau. He became an assistant of the sociologist Gunther Ipsen in Königsberg in 1935. Conze's field of Ostforschung studied east-central Europe and the region's connections to Germany- many scholars and institutions in Ostforschung supported the Nazi policy of German expansion in eastern Europe, even advocating measures such as ethnic cleansing. While he continued to work on his habilitation under Ipsen in Königsberg, in 1936 Conze accepted a scholarship of the Publikationsstelle Berlin-Dahlem (PuSte), part of the Prussian State Archives in Berlin. The PuSte was a politically motivated organization aimed at countering the work of Polish historians. Conze was also supported by the Nord- und Ostdeutsche Forschungsgemeinschaft (NOFG), for which Conze made reports about the areas around Vilnius and northeast Poland, which included an involvement with German intelligence services. Conze joined the Nazi party on May 1, 1937, after the prohibition of new members that had been enacted after the Nazi seizure of power was lifted.

In 1937, Conze stopped his work for the PuSte and NOFG to return to Königsberg and work on his habilitation with Ipsen, for which he took agrarian society in Lithuania and Belarus as a topic, with the intention of solving the problem of "village overpopulation". Between 1937 and 1940 in a series of articles Conze proposed the purging of Jews from Eastern Europe by unspecified means, particularly in Lithuania and Belarus. In 1938 Conze blamed the lack of industry in Belarus on "Jewish domination", and referred to Vilnius as a "center of world Jewry", a "foreign body" which would have to be removed. Tasked by Ipsen with discussing "Polish overpopulation" for the canceled 14. Sociological Conference in Bucharest in 1939, Conze argued that the Polish population had "degenerated" because Jews in the cities were preventing it from moving into trades there. His proposed solutions were re-division of agrarian land and the surrender of Polish sovereignty to Germany in exchange for agrarian reform, as well as the purging of Jews from Polish cities and towns. In Conze's habilitation, which he finished at the University of Vienna in 1940, where he had followed Ipsen, Conze continued these positions, arguing that the "class of farmers" was threatened by Jews and legitimizing anti-semitic legislation.

From 1939 to 1945 during World War II, Conze served in the 291st Infantry Division, in which he eventually attained the rank of Hauptmann. Members of the division were involved in the Liepāja massacres carried out in the Latvian city of Liepāja in June and July 1941, during which 3000 people, including 2500 Jews, were murdered. Conze was made a professor at the Reichsuniversität Posen, established in occupied Poznań in Poland, in 1943. He was helped to this position by the Baltic German historian Reinhard Wittram; his work in Posen prevented him from taking a position in the administration of resettlement in the occupied Reichskommissariat Ostland. Conze was unable to actually take his position in Poznań due to his military service. Conze then fought at the eastern front, where he was badly wounded in 1944. In the meantime his family fled west. At the end of the war Conze ended up in a Soviet POW camp.

=== Post-war career ===
After initially struggling to find work, Conze received a teaching position at the University of Göttingen in 1946. In 1951 he moved to the University of Münster. From 1957 to his retirement in 1979 he was professor at the University of Heidelberg, Conze continued to collaborate with many scholars he knew from Königsberg, most of whom were connected to his dissertation advisor Rothfels - this group was instrumental in the success of social history after the war, including especially Theodor Schieder. While at Heidelberg, he developed a reputation for innovative, experimental scholarship and attracted many young scholars to work with him, becoming one of the most important mentors of postwar German historians, including of Reinhart Koselleck, whose habilitation he advised. Conze founded the Heidelberg Institute for Social and Economic Studies as well as the Working Circle for Modern Social History in 1957. One of Conze's academic goals—along with Schieder—was to "understand the disaster of National Socialism." From 1969–1970 he was briefly the rector of the University of Heidelberg. Conze's term as rector was cut short after colleagues rejected him for being too "progressive" for his support for university reform, while he also became the target of student protesters who thought of him as a "reactionary," attacked his Nazi past, and objected that his theories of social history failed to account for the Marxist view of history. From 1972-1976 he was the president of the Deutscher Historikerverband.

Conze continued to study German agrarian society until the end of the 40s. Afterwards, he moved away from his earlier völkisch positions and became a major advocate of social history. In 1957, Conze published an important essay Die Strukturgeschichte des technisch-industriellen Zeitalters als Aufgabe für Forschung und Unterricht, in which he argued for a recent history focused on larger social processes rather than on the biographies of great individuals. In developing "social history", Conze continued to use many of the concepts developed by Ostforschung and Volksgeschichte, including its focus on "overpopulation." According to Reinhart Koselleck, Conze's work underwent a "paradigm shift" and he began to study social structures rather than ethnic ones. During his later years, Conze co-edited the eight-volume encyclopedia Geschichtliche Grundbegriffe (1972-1997) with Koselleck and Otto Brunner. The work aimed to investigate fundamental concepts in history via techniques taken from linguistics and serves as a foundational work of German conceptual history (Begriffsgeschichte). Conze was the driving force behind the encyclopedia, editing three volumes before his death and writing many of the entries himself.

Immediately after the war, Conze disagreed with scholars who wanted to study the reasons for the "German catastrophe" of Nazism and the Second World War. Conze believed that Nazism was a modern phenomenon with few roots in earlier German history. In Conze's academic publications, he mostly portrayed the German people as victims of the Third Reich rather than willing participants, and avoided discussing the Holocaust and other German crimes in his scholarship. Conze advised more work on the Nazi period than he himself published, with his students who investigated the Nazis and their crimes including Hans Mommsen and Reinhard Bollmus.

From 1956 onward, Conze was a member of the Schieder commission, a project sponsored by the West German government that tried to document the experiences of German expellees from Eastern Europe by assembling and analyzing first-hand accounts as a way to integrate the expellees into West German Society. The project analyzed German victimhood in the expulsions without analyzing the context of Nazi genocide that led to the expulsions. In the 1950s, Conze was one of only two German pre-war Ostforscher who agreed to cooperate with East German scholar and former resistance fighter Rudi Goguel, who researched the role of Ostforschung during World War II.

== Controversy over involvement with Nazism ==
Conze's involvement with and ideological support of the aims of the Nazis in eastern Europe became a subject of great controversy in 1998 at a meeting of the Union of German Historians. Conze's involvement in Nazi plans for ethnic cleansing remained largely hidden after the war. When Conze's involvement in Nazi crimes was exposed in the 1990s and early 2000s, his former students mostly tried to defend him. Assessments of Conze's role in Nazi atrocities range from calling him and fellow influential postwar historian and former Nazi Theodor Schieder "architects of annihilation" (Götz Aly and Susanne Heim) to collaborators with "little influence" (Wolfgang Mommsen).

What was very clear at least, were indications that both Schieder and Conze either supported or participated in the creation of the Nazi Generalplan Ost, which advocated the removal of large population groups in eastern Europe and their replacement with ethnic Germans. Schieder offered up expanding Lebensraum at the expense of ethnic Poles along with Poland's de-Judaization; Conze's input regarding German conquest was likewise replete with antisemitic commentary about how the "Führer's name" had reached "the most remote villages" in White Russia "due to his clear politics on the Jewish Question."

Conze biographer Jan Eike Dunkhase argues that Conze's antisemitic remarks in his pre-1945 work are examples of the seeping in of the Nazi world view rather than evidence of his guilt for Nazi atrocities. In his later work, Conze avoided racial language and his earlier focus on the "people/nation" (German: Volk) and agrarian society, instead studying modern industrial society. However, in the opinion of Georg Iggers, Conze maintained the essential elements of his earlier views on history. Werner Lausecker argues that Conze continued to make use of anti-Semitic tropes in his work after the war and even to justify the oppression of Jews.

== Selected works ==
- Hirschenhof. Die Geschichte einer deutschen Sprachinsel in Livland. Berlin: Junker & Dünnhaupt. 1934.
- Die weißrussische Frage in Polen. Berlin: Bund Deutscher Osten. 1939.
- Agrarverfassung und Bevölkerung in Litauen und Weißrußland. Leipzig: Hirzel. 1940.
- Leibniz als Historiker. de Gruyter. 1951.
- Die Geschichte der 291. Infanterie-Division 1940–1945. Bad Nauheim: H. H. Podzun. 1953.
- Die preußische Reform unter Stein und Hardenberg. Bauernbefreiung und Städteordnung. Stuttgart: Klett. 1956.
- Die Strukturgeschichte des technisch-industriellen Zeitalters als Aufgabe für Forschung und Unterricht. Cologne, Opladen: Westdeutscher Verlag. 1957.
- Deutsche Einheit. Münster: Aschendorff. 1958.
- Polnische Nation und deutsche Politik im Ersten Weltkrieg. Cologne: Böhlau. 1958.
- Der 17. Juni. Tag der deutschen Freiheit und Einheit. Frankfurt am Main/Bonn: Athenäum Verlag. 1960.
- Conze, Werner; Schieder, Theodor (1962). Staat und Gesellschaft im deutschen Vormärz 1815–1848. 7 Beiträge. Stuttgart: Klett-Cotta.
- Die Deutsche Nation. Ergebnis der Geschichte. Göttingen: Vandenhoeck & Ruprecht. 1963.
- Die Zeit Wilhelms II. und die Weimarer Republik. Deutsche Geschichte 1890-1933. Wunderlich. 1964.
- Conze, Werner; Groh, Dieter (1966). Die Arbeiterbewegung in der nationalen Bewegung; die deutsche Sozialdemokratie vor, während, und nach der Reichsgründung. Klett.
- Conze, Werner; Kosthorst, Erich; Nebgen, Elfriede (1969). Jakob Kaiser. Politiker zwischen Ost und West 1945–1949. Stuttgart: Kohlhammer.
- Sozialgeschichte der Familie in der Neuzeit Europas. Neue Forschungen. Klett. 1976.
- Brunner, Otto; Conze, Werner; Koselleck, Reinhart, eds. (1972–1997). Geschichtliche Grundbegriffe. Historisches Lexikon zur politisch-sozialen Sprache in Deutschland (8 volumes). Stuttgart: Klett-Cotta.
- Engelhardt, Ulrich, ed. (1992). Gesellschaft – Staat – Nation. Gesammelte Aufsätze. Stuttgart: Klett-Cotta. ISBN 978-3-608-91366-8.
