= Karl Heinz Bremer =

German historian (1911–1942)

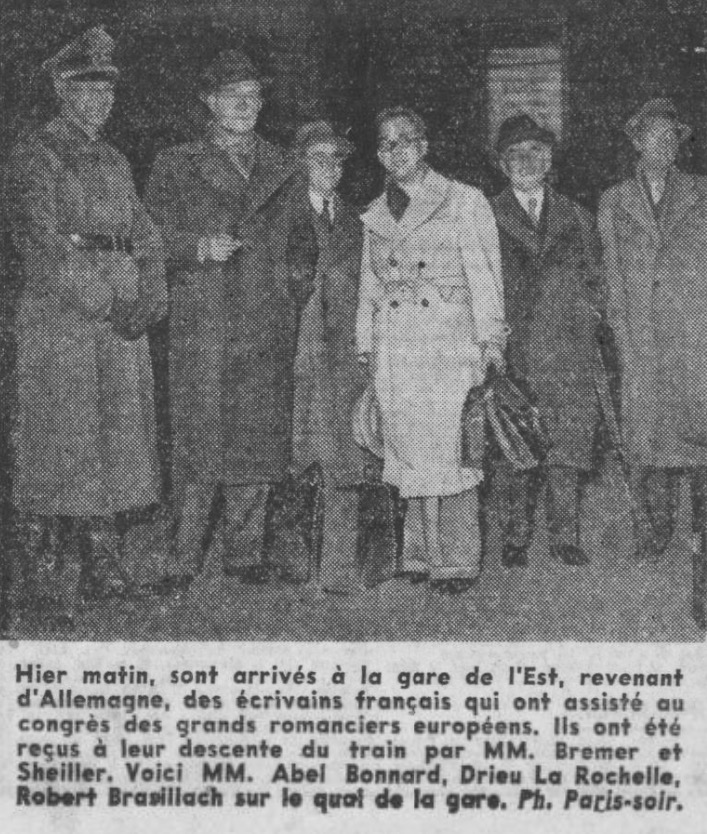
- Bremer with Abel Bonnard, Brasillach and Drieu La Rochelle in 1941
- Born: 16 November 1911; Frankfurt, German Empire
- Died: 2 May 1942 (aged 30); Veliky Novgorod
- Education: University of Königsberg
- Scientific career
- Workplaces: École Normale Supérieure, University of Kiel, German Institute (Paris)
- Doctoral advisor: Hans Rothfels

Karl Heinz Bremer (16 November 1911 – 2 May 1942) was a German historian who died during the Second World War.

He had taught German at the Sorbonne and the Ecole Normale before the Second World War. He joined the Nazi Party (NSDAP) 1 May 1937. Following the fall of France, Bremer was the associate director of the German Institute in Paris, from its creation in the fall of 1940 until he was sent to the Russian front 27 February 1942. The German Institute was responsible for editing the French press, and for controlling newly published French books during the occupation.

Bremer is known for the friendship he developed with the French collaborator and journalist Robert Brasillach. This friendship prospered because both men were eager to exchange knowledge of each other's country and culture. But Bremer got involved very much in the policy of the Nazis in Paris. Together with Gerhard Heller, he became the main censor of the German embassy in Paris. Bremer also translated several works of Henry de Montherlant.

After a change in the personal policy of the Auswärtiges Amt, Bremer was sent to the Eastern front as many men servicing not in the army. He died shortly later at a battle near Lake Ilmen.

In April 1943, Henry de Montherlant wrote an obituary for Bremer in the journal "Germany-France. Quarterly Journal of the German Institute in Paris" ("Deutschland-Frankreich. Vierteljahrsschrift des Deutschen Instituts Paris"), which was titled „Souvenirs sur Karl Heinz Bremer“.

Bremer diagnosed, in 1938, in an article at the German magazine Die Tat the situation of the Second Republic in the following manner. While the republicans of 1848 were trying to solve the constitutional question, he observed, Louis Napoleon realized that the social question was the most important one. Parliamentarism, with its conflicting political parties and class struggles, was incapable of solving the social question. Only a dictatorship with a social outlook, in the view of Napoleon, could solve it. His great aim was to establish a political system based upon the unity of all classes and of all interests in France. It was Napoleon, according to Bremer, who first created the new type of state in the form of authoritarian, plebiscitarian leadership." Napoleon was seen by Bremer as the predecessor of Hitler.

Bremer also said that Proudhon popularized a social idea that was anti-liberal in order to give a social significance to the Second Empire. Proudhon developed a social idea for Louis Napoleon that was to bring workers into the Second Empire. Because Proudhon advocated slow changes over time, Napoleon rejected this solution.

== Selected publications ==
- "Der sozialistische Kaiser", Die Tat, XXX (June 1938).
