= Schieder commission =

Organization of West German historians

Documents on the Expulsion of the Germans from Eastern-Central Europe is the abridged English translation of a multi-volume publication that was created by a commission of West German historians between 1951 and 1961 to document the population transfer of Germans from East-Central Europe that had occurred after World War II. Created by the Federal Ministry for Displaced Persons, Refugees and War Victims, the commission headed by Theodor Schieder (thus known as the Schieder commission) consisted primarily of well-known historians, however with a Nazi past. Therefore, while in the immediate post war period the commission was regarded as composed of very accomplished historians, the later assessment of its members changed. The later historians are debating how reliable are the findings of the commission, and to what degree they were influenced by Nazi and nationalist point of view.

Motivated by the Lebensraum ideology, some of the historians themselves had played an active role in these war crimes. Due to its relative frankness, the final summary volume was suppressed for political reasons and was never finished.

== Historical background and origins of the research project ==
=== Lebensraum and Generalplan Ost ===
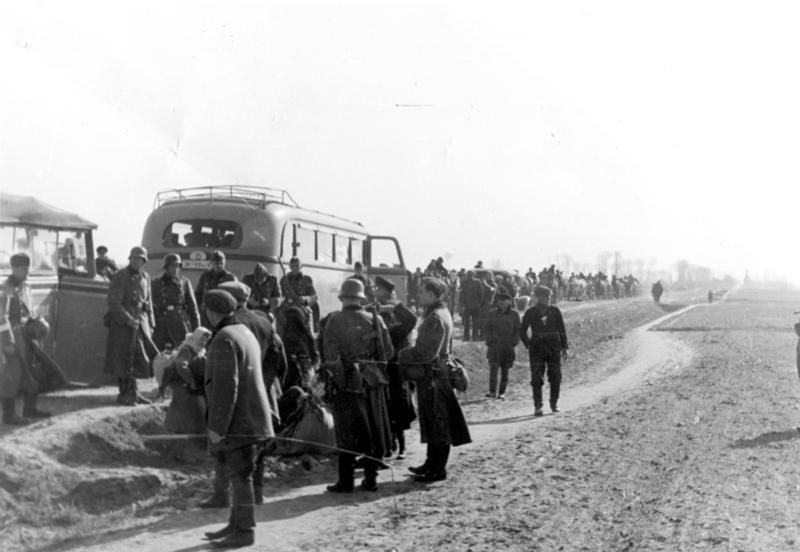
Expulsion of hundreds of thousands of Poles from Reichsgau Wartheland (1939)

The Schieder Commission did not inform the readers about the implementation of the earlier Lebensraum concept: in 1938 and 1939 Nazi Germany expanded its territory far into the east, annexing parts of Czechoslovakia and Poland (Sudetenland, Warthegau). This was intended as only a first step towards establishing the so-called A–A line from Arkhangelsk to Astrakhan (both located in Russia) as Germany's new eastern border. Parts of Poland were "Germanized" by force, the local Polish majority population being subject to mass executions and murder as well as expelled into other parts of Poland. The Jews were systematically killed. In some cases German historians were involved in determining the fate of villages based on racial criteria. Ethnically German minorities from further east and settlers from within Nazi Reich were invited to settle in the annexed areas. Thousands of children from the occupied territories were kidnapped and examined according to racial criteria. Those who were eventually considered "Aryan" were given German names and thoroughly Germanized, but most were sent to orphanages, died from malnutrition or were killed in Auschwitz.

=== German expellees in early West Germany ===
- Where they came from. At least 12 million affected, said to be the largest movement of any single ethnic population in modern history (per Expulsion of Germans after World War II#Legacy of the expulsions)
- Many fled through the Soviet-controlled territory to the western zones
- Extent of the population influx: Mecklenburg's number of inhabitants doubled. Previously purely Catholic regions got an influx of Protestants and conversely. Explosion of small settlements into big towns, see Heimatvertriebene#Expellee towns.
- Conditions in early post-war Germany
- Systematically organized interviews with arriving expellees as material to be used against the Soviet Union
- Federal ministry for expellees
- Integration of expellees into West German society

=== Origins of the project ===
The project had its roots in initiatives in the British and American occupation zones that preceded the foundation of West Germany in 1951. At the time German politicians expected that a peace treaty would offer the chance for a revision of Germany's new eastern border. The German project which was to portray Germans as alleged victims of suffering, in particular as caused by the Red Army, was hoped to balance the atrocities committed by Nazi Germany and create international sympathy for German territorial claims against neighbouring countries. These motivations were fully endorsed by Schieder and other commission members such as Diestelkamp, who felt that Germany had missed a similar chance after it lost the First World War, and that a related Polish project needed a counter-weight. Domestically, the documentation of the expelled persons' fate was meant to support their integration into West German society.

In the immediate post war period the commission was regarded as composed of very accomplished historians. The head of the commission, Theodor Schieder, had previously been closely associated with the Nazi settlement policy in occupied countries in Eastern Europe. Schieder in turn was supervised by Theodor Oberländer (who also wrote the introduction to the published works of the commission), the head of the Ministry, who had been Schieder's colleague in the Nazi Ostforschung. Oberländer is considered by some historians (for example, Götz Aly) to be one of the academics who laid the intellectual foundation for the Final Solution.

== Members of the Commission ==
The commission was headed by Theodor Schieder. Members of the editorial board were Peter Rassow, Hans Rothfels, Rudolf Laun as well as Adolf Diestelkamp, who died in 1953 and was replaced by Werner Conze. Apart from international law expert Laun and archivist Diestelkamp, all were distinguished historians. Non-board members included historians Hans Booms, Martin Broszat, Eckhart Franz, Kurt Kluxen, Hans-Ulrich Wehler and also several so-called "collectors" (of sources).

The commission was created in 1951 by Hans Lukaschek, former German propaganda chief throughout the Upper Silesia plebiscite after First World War, known for his anti-Polish views Minister for the Expelled in West Germany from 1949 to 1953. Lukaschek had before been an important Silesian politician responsible for persecution of Polish teachers and pupils in that region, and lawyer, was actively involved in anti-Nazi resistance and in 1948 was appointed vice president of the British and US zones' supreme court. After the war Lukaschek was reported by British press as saying that Germany's former eastern territories, ' including those occupied by Czechoslovakia will become German again

Schieder chose as members of the commission, individuals such as Werner Conze, who had previously advocated "dejewification" of territory occupied by Nazi Germany. During the Nazi era in Germany, both Conze and Schieder had devoted their attention to the issue of Nazi settlement policies, including the matter of "depopulating" Poland of its Jewish population. Schieder was also one of the primary authors of a document entitled Generalplan Ost which called for creating "Lebensraum" (living-space) for Germans in Eastern Europe by enslaving or starving to death the Slavs, and killing all the Jews who lived there. Another person chosen was Hans Rothfels. Rothfels, while opposed to the Nazi regime and forced to emigrate from Germany during World War II, was also a German nationalist who in the interwar period advocated German domination of Eastern Europe and making its population into serfs.

As such, according to Hughes, the members of the commission were "consciously committed to ... propagandist activity in their government's service". The propagandist aims of the German government at the time were to utilize the commission's work to keep the question of the territories lost by Germany as a result of World War II open. Adolf Diestelkamp, another member of the commission, expressed the hope that the work of the commission would be a "decisive factor in our fight to win back the German east", that is, territories which Germany ceded to Poland after World War II. The commission relied heavily on interest groups, including expellee organizations, to collect their sources. Some of the witness accounts gathered by the commission reflected Nazi propaganda

Rothfels was the one who had originally proposed Schieder as head of the editorial staff, having been his teacher and a key intellectual influence during the Nazi period. Younger historians, such as Martin Broszat (who researched Yugoslavia) and Hans-Ulrich Wehler (who helped research Romania), who were later to break with the tradition of Schieder and Conze, served as research assistants (see also Historikerstreit).

In the immediate post war period the commission was regarded as composed of very accomplished historians.

=== Theodor Schieder ===
Theodor Schieder had lived in Königsberg in East Prussia since 1934. In the interwar period Schieder was known as one of a group of conservative historians with little sympathy towards the Weimar republic Once the Nazis seized power, Schieder directed a regional center devoted to the study of East Prussia and World War I. According to Robert Moeller, after 1945 Schieder merely transferred his ideas about one German defeat to the study of another. In 1937 he joined the Nazi party himself. Schieder enthusiastically supported Hitler's invasion of Poland and wrote academic papers on Germany's role as a "force of order" and a "bearer of a unique cultural mission", in Eastern Europe. During World War II he advocated the "dejudaization" of territories occupied by Germany. As one of the prominent proponents of German racism, he advocated maintaining German "race purity" by not mixing with other, "inferior" nationals. The aim of Schieder's research was to justify alleged German supremacy over other peoples. He fled Königsberg when the Red Army approached it December 1944.

After World War II Schieder was "deNazified" and kept publicly quiet about his past. He was appointed to a chair in modern history at the University of Cologne in 1947, and in the 1950s edited one of the most known historical journals in the Federal Republic of Germany. However, personal correspondence with Werner Conze from this time, revealed that they still held old antisemitic prejudices.

=== Werner Conze ===
Werner Conze was a doctoral student of Rothfels in Königsberg under the Nazis, where he claimed in his research that Germans had a positive role in the development of eastern Europe. Just like with Schieder's, the goal of his research was to justify alleged German supremacy over other nations and their right to take over new territories. With the Nazis taking power, Conze, together with Schieder and Rothfels helped to institutionalize racial ethnic research in the Third Reich. He also connected with Nazi propaganda, writing for a journal "Jomsburg" published in Third Reich by Reich's Internal Ministry According to German historian Ingo Haar, "the Nazis made use of (this) racist scholarship, which lent itself gladly". While working for German espionage, in 1936, Conze prepared a document which portrayed Poland as backward and in need of German order and which recommended the exclusion of Jews from the legal system as Conze considered them outside the law. In further work issued in 1938 Conze continued in similar vein, blaming lack of industry in Belarus on "Jewish domination"

During the war Conze fought at the Eastern Front. In the meantime his family fled west. At the end of the war Werner Conze ended up in a Soviet POW camp. After the war, Conze moved to Munster, then to Heidelberg.

== Goals and work of the Commission ==
=== Presenting expulsions as one of the great catastrophes in German history ===
Part of Schieder's aim was to make sure that the expulsions were established as "one of the most momentous events in all of European history and one of the great catastrophes in the development of the German people". He sought to make sure that the publishing of selected documents would bring to light events which he felt had so far been "for the most part hushed up" The intended audience of the commission's findings were not just Germans, but also readers in other Western countries, particularly the Allies who had signed the Potsdam Agreement. To that end, substantial excerpts from the five volumes published by the commission were made available in English language translation.

=== Supporting revision of post-war settlements ===
Schieder and other members of the commission were interested in more than just sympathy for the expellees. They also hoped that the work of the commission would help to convince the victorious Western allies to revise their position with regard to Germany's post war eastern borders with Poland. In doing so Schieder endorsed the ties between work of his historians and the Federal Republic's desire to for revision of post-war boundary settlement, being fully convinced such result would outweigh the problem of responses from Eastern Europe.

=== Countering information about atrocities committed by Nazi Germany ===
An official of the Ministry of Expellees envisioned use of the commission's work to counter the "false impression, produced by the propaganda of the opponent" that Nazi German forces of occupation in Eastern Europe "had raped robbed, terrorized, and butchered the population as long as Hitler was in power", which the official claimed was presented in documents of the Polish government. Information about Nazi atrocities was described by the Ministry as "perverted version of the war's history".

== Methodology ==
The commissioned gathered and used a large number of primary sources and Schieder also wanted the volumes produced to also include supposed political context of the events. Two out of the five volumes, about Romania, prepared by Broszat, and the one on Yugoslavia prepared by Wehler, included some form of analysis of collaboration by the local Germans during the war, Nazi plans and the atrocities of German occupation. At the center of the project were documents prepared by expellee organizations, German government, testimonies dictated in response to questions from officials of regional expellee interest groups, and personal diaries initially written as retrospective for the author or family. Together the volumes contained 4,300 densely printed pages.

While the commission was aware that first person accounts of the expulsions were often unreliable, the members believed it was necessary to utilize these in their work, as they did not trust either Nazi era sources, nor those published by post war communist governments. The use of personal testimonies was part of the "modern history" approach developed earlier by Rothfels and applied in practice by the commission. Both Rothfels and Schieder were concerned with the accuracy of these accounts. As a result, Rothfels insisted that the relevant documents were subjected to "historical standards of measurement" that characterized other historical research. Schieder insisted if an account failed to pass official "testing procedures" set up by the commission, then the account would be completely excluded. As a result, the commission claimed that their methods "transform(ed) subjective memory into unassailable fact".

== Commission's conclusions ==
The five volumes produced by the commission were entitled Dokumentation der Vertreibung der Deutschen aus Ost-Mitteleuropa (Documents on the Expulsions of Germans from East-Central Europe). The first volume dealt with former German territories east of the Oder-Neisse line, the second with Hungary, the third with Romania, the fourth with Czechoslovakia and the fifth with Yugoslavia. The volumes included a summary report, official documents relating to the expulsions and a section with the eyewitness accounts of expellees living in West Germany .

In 1953, Hans Lukaschek presented a report of the commission for the former German territories east of the Oder-Neisse line, pre-war Poland and the Free City of Danzig. They estimated 2.484 million deaths including 500,000 Wehrmacht and 50,000 civilian aerial warfare casualties and some eight million expellees from Poland and the Soviet Kaliningrad region. Schieder made a round estimate for the entire Oder-Neisse territory of some two million civilian deaths which included the wartime flight of refugees, post war expulsions and deaths during forced labor in the Soviet Union. The Schieder commission included Germans resettled in Poland during the war in the total population involved in the wartime evacuations and flight but his figure of 2.0 million deaths is for the prewar population only. In 1956 and 1957 the commission issued separate reports for Czechoslovakia, Romania and Hungary and in 1961 the commission issued its final report on Yugoslavia. All of these reports estimated a total of some 2.3 million civilian deaths and 12 million expellees from east-central Europe.

Apart from the Schieder commission the Statistisches Bundesamt Federal Statistical Office of Germany was responsible for issuing a final report analyzing the figures relating to the population losses due to the expulsions. The German historian Ingo Haar maintains that during the Cold War the West German government put political pressure on the Statistisches Bundesamt to push their figures upward to agree to the previously published figures of the Schieder commission estimating 2.3 million dead and missing. West German internal reports available at that time based on the classified records of the Search Service which traced those persons who were dead or missing indicated that there about 500,000 confirmed deaths and 1.9 million unresolved cases which lacked adequate support. The Search Service data was archived and not released to the general public until 1988– according to Ingo Haar, this was due to a fear that they were "too low" and would lead to "politically undesirable conclusions" Harr points out that these issues were raised with the West German government but they insisted that the Statistisches Bundesamt match the figures published by Schieder's commission. However the Statistisches Bundesamt issued a report in 1958 which put expulsion deaths at some 2.2 million in agreement with Schieder's total

A 1974 an internal study by the German Federal Archives found some 600,000 deaths, including 400,000 in the Oder-Neisse territory, 130,000 in Czechoslovakia and 80,000 in Yugoslavia. The study excluded losses in Hungary, Romania and Soviet Germans deported within the Soviet Union. This study was not released to the public until in 1989.

The estimates of 2.0 million deaths due to expulsions have been criticized by subsequent researchers. For example, according to the German historian Rüdiger Overmans it is only possible to establish the deaths of 500,000 individuals and there is nothing in German historiography which could explain the other 1.5 million deaths. Overmans and Ingo Haar state that confirmed deaths result in a number between 500,000 and 600,000. Both believe that further research is needed to determine the fate of the estimated additional 1.9 million civilians listed as missing. However, according to Overmans the 500,000 to 600,000 deaths found by the Search Service and German Federal Archives are based on incomplete information and do not provide a definitive answer to losses in the expulsions. However Overmans maintains that there are more arguments in favor of the lower figure of 500,000 than the official figure of 2.0 million, he believes that additional research is needed to determine an accurate accounting of the losses. Ingo Haar has said that all reasonable estimates of deaths from expulsions lie between around 500,000 to 600,000.

According to Rüdiger Overmans, the German Red Cross Search Service records list 473,013 confirmed deaths and some 1.9 million persons listed as missing. Overmans maintains that the figure of missing persons includes non Germans included in the total population surveyed, military deaths, the figures for living expellees in the GDR and remaining ethnic Germans in post war east central Europe were not reliable. Ingo Harr maintains that the figures for expulsion dead include children who were never born (due to lower wartime fertility), German speaking Jews murdered in the Holocaust and individuals who were assimilated into the local population after the war. He also stated that the Statistisches Bundesamt's 2.225 million number relied on improper statistical methodology and incomplete data, particularly in regard to the expellees who arrived in East Germany after the war.

== See also ==
- Drang nach Osten ("The Drive Eastward")
- Historiography and nationalism
