= Ingo Haar =

German historian (born 1965)

Ingo Haar (born 3 February 1965) is a German historian. He received his Master of Arts from the University of Hamburg in 1993 and his PhD in History in 1998 at the Martin Luther University of Halle-Wittenberg. His doctoral dissertation was on "Historians in Nazi Germany: the German history and the`'Ethnic struggle' in the `East'" (Historiker im Nationalsozialismus: die deutsche Geschichtswissenschaft und der `Volkstumskampf´ im `Osten´).

The book "German Scholars and Ethnic Cleansing, 1919-1945" of which Haar was a co-editor of (along with Michael Fahlbusch) received the Choice Award for "Outstanding Book of the Year" in 2005.

Dr. Haar is currently on the faculty of the University of Vienna. Previously he was associated with the Centre for Research on Antisemitism (Zentrum für Antisemitismusforschung) at Technische Universität Berlin.

Ingo Haar believes that civilian losses in the expulsion of the Germans from eastern Europe have been overstated in Germany for decades for political reasons. Haar argues that Cold War political pressure influenced the findings of the Schieder commission and the 1958 West German government demographic study that estimated 2 million expulsion deaths. Haar maintains that the actual number of deaths directly related to the expulsions is between 500 and 600,000 persons based on the findings of the German church search service and the report of the German government archives. Dr. Haar maintains that the figure of 2 million expulsion deaths includes "a fall in the German birth rate, persons assimilated into the local population, military dead, murdered Jews and missing persons" Haar has criticized the Federation of Expellees for inflating the numbers of German victims of the expulsion of Germans after World War II,; the former expellees' president Erika Steinbach in her reply accused Haar of reducing the number of victims.

== Works ==
=== Monographs ===
- Historiker im Nationalsozialismus. Deutsche Geschichtswissenschaft und der „Volkstumskampf“ im Osten. 2nd Edition, Göttingen 2002.

=== Important Articles ===
- Die Genesis der Endlösung aus dem Geiste der Wissenschaften: Volksgeschichte und Bevölkerungspolitik im Nationalsozialismus. In: ZfG 49 (2001), p. 13-31.
- „Volksgeschichte“ und Königsberger Milieu: Forschungsprogramme zwischen Revisionspolitik und nationalsozialistischer Vernichtungsplanung. In: Hartmut Lehmann/Otto Gerhard Oexle (Hg.): Nationalsozialismus in den Kulturwissenschaften. Göttingen 2004, p. 169-210.
- Friedrich Valjavec: ein Historikerleben zwischen den Wiener Schiedssprüchen und der Dokumentation der Vertreibung. In: Lucia Scherzberg (Hg.): Theologie und Vergangenheitsbewältigung. Eine kritische Bestandsaufnahme im interdisziplinären Vergleich. Paderborn 2005, p. 103-119.
- Rassistische Differenzkonstruktionen und biopolitische Ordnungsinstrumente im besetzten Polen 1939-44. Raum- und Bevölkerungspolitik im Spannungsfeld zwischen örtlichen Zivilverwaltungen und zentralstaatlichen Führungsanspruch. In: Jürgen John (Hg. u. a.): Die NS-Gaue. Regionale Mittelinstanzen im zentralistischen „Führerstaat“. Munich 2007, p. 105-122.
- „Sudetendeutsche” Bevölkerungsfragen zwischen Minderheitenkampf und Münchener Abkommen: Zur Nationalisierung und Radikalisierung deutscher Wissenschaftsmilieus in der Tschechoslowakischen Republik 1919-1939. In: Historical Social Research 31 (2006), p. 236-262.
- Die deutschen „Vertreibungsverluste“ – Zur Entstehungsgeschichte der „Dokumentation der Vertreibung“. In: Tel Aviver Jahrbuch 35 (2007), p. 251-272.
- Демографическая конструкция «потерь от изгнания»: состояние исследования, проблемы, перспективы. In: Европа 24 (2007), p. 113-133.
- Ursprünge, Arten und Folgen des Konstrukts „Bevölkerung“ vor, im und nach dem „Dritten Reich“ Zur Geschichte der deutschen Bevölkerungswissensch: Ingo Haar Die deutschen ›Vertreibungsverluste‹ – Forschungsstand, Kontexte und Probleme, in Ursprünge, Arten und Folgen des Konstrukts „Bevölkerung“ vor, im und nach dem „Dritten Reich“ Springer 2009: ISBN 978-3-531-16152-5
- Herausforderung Bevölkerung : zu Entwicklungen des modernen Denkens über die Bevölkerung vor, im und nach dem Dritten Reich Ingo Haar, Bevölkerungsbilanzen“ und „Vertreibungsverluste. Zur Wissenschaftsgeschichte der deutschen Opferangaben aus Flucht und Vertreibung Verlag für Sozialwissenschaften 2007 ISBN 978-3-531-15556-2

=== Edited volumes ===
- German Scholars and Ethnic Cleansing (1933-1944). 2nd Edition, New York 2006.
- Handbuch der völkischen Wissenschaften 1918-1960. Personen – Institutionen – Forschungsprogramme - Stiftungen. Munich 2008.
