= Theodor Schieder =

German historian and ethnographer

- Schieder in 1958, official portrait

Personal details
- Born: 11 April 1908 Oettingen, Kingdom of Bavaria, German Empire
- Died: 8 October 1984 (aged 76) Cologne, West Germany
- Education: Ludwig-Maximilians-Universität München
- Occupation: Historian

Theodor Schieder (11 April 1908 – 8 October 1984) was a German historian. Born in Oettingen, Western Bavaria, he relocated to Königsberg in East Prussia in 1934 at the age of 26.^{[p. 56]} He joined the Nazi Party in 1937. During the Nazi era, Schieder became part of a group of German conservative historians antagonistic towards the Weimar Republic. He pursued a racially-oriented social history (Volksgeschichte), and warned about the supposed dangers of Germans mixing with other nations. During this time, Schieder used ethnographic methods to justify German supremacy and expansion. He was the author of the "Memorandum of 7 October 1939", calling for Germanization of the captured Polish territories after the Invasion of Poland. His suggestions were later incorporated in the German Generalplan Ost. After the war, he settled in West Germany and worked at the University of Cologne.

== World War II ==
=== Memorandum of 7 October 1939 ===
After Invasion of Poland by Germany Schieder created a memorandum called "Settlement and ethnic questions in the reclaimed areas of Poland" which summarized work of a group dedicated Ostforschung. Deportations of Jews and Poles were justified in the memorandum with the right of the victor, he also warned about "dangers of racial mixing" and "ethnic infiltration". He demanded removal of Jews from Polish cities and liquidation of Polish intelligentsia; only 150.000 Kashubs were suitable for Reich citizenship after a probation period. The memorandum made in autumn 1939 provided information on national issues in contested areas of Polish-German borderlands and demonstrated that a group of historians in Eastern Germany were ready to help Nazis in their goals of ethnic cleansing

=== Support for Nazi expansion ===
Schieder also enthusiastically supported the German invasion of Poland and wrote academic papers on Germany's role as a "force of order" and a "bearer of a unique cultural mission" in Eastern Europe. During the war he, along with Werner Conze, gave advice on Lebensraum policies of the Nazi regime in occupied territories in the East, which included theories on deJudaization of towns in Poland and Lithuania.

=== Cooperation with Gauleiter Erich Koch regarding ethnic policy in conquered territories ===
In March 1940, Schieder, who was director in charge of the Regional Office for Postwar History (Landesstelle fur Nachkriegsgeschichte) presented the local Gauleiter Erich Koch with a detailed plan regarding studies of territories annexed to East Prussia; Koch himself wanted to know political, social, and ethnic conditions in those areas. Schieder in return sent two reports to Koch, including a population inventory conducted at the end of the 19th century of the area in question, which was most relevant to Nazi policies of extermination and settlement, and provided a basis for segregation of Jewish and "Slavic" spouses from ethnic Germans in the German Volksliste.

In 1942 Gauleiter Erich Koch expressed thanks to Schieder for his help in Nazi operations in annexed Poland, writing: As a director of 'Landesstelle Ostpreußen für Nachkriegsgeschichte' you have provided material that provided significant service in our fight against Poles and continues to help us in establishing new order today in Regierungsbezirke Zichenau and Bialystok.

== Post-war ==
After the war, Schieder settled in West Germany, where he held a position at University of Cologne and worked as a respected historian for the West German government. In 1952 he headed the government commission for researching the expulsion of Germans. From 1962 to 1964 he was the rector of the University of Cologne and from 1965 headed the Research Department of the History Department. He was also the president of the Historical Commission of the Bavarian Academy of Sciences and the president of the Academy of Sciences of Rhine-Westphalia. From 1967 to 1972 Schieder chaired the German Historians' Association. "Schieder’s work – wrote Dr. Deborah Barton from University of Toronto – referred to the Poles and Soviets as "frenzied," "sadistic," and "driven by national hatred," whereas the language applied to Nazi crimes was more benign and conceptual ... The volumes, published between 1956 and 1963 amounted to a "scholarly seal of approval" for Germany's victimization narrative" of the following decades. The testimonies presented in the [Schieder] documentation – wrote Professor Robert G. Moeller – depicted Germans not as perpetrators but as victims of "a crime against humanity." Schieder died in Cologne, Germany.

== Leading postwar publications ==
- Schieder, Theodor (ed.) Dokumentation der Vertreibung der Deutschen aus Ost-Mitteleuropa, Bonn 1953 (Documents on the Expulsion of the Germans from Eastern & Central Europe), Bonn: Federal Ministry for Expellees, Refugees, & War Victims, (following dates may indicate year of English translations rather than original publication):
  - vol. 1: Die vertreibung der deutschen Bevölkerung aus den Gebieten östlich der Oder-Neisse (The Expulsion of the German Population from the Territories East of the Oder-Neisse Line, 1959)
  - vol. 2 and 3: Bd. 2. Das Schicksal der Deutschen in Ungarn, Bd. 3. Das Schicksal der Deutschen in Rumanien (The Expulsion of the German Population from Hungary and Rumania, 1961)
  - vol. 4: Die Vertreibung der deutschen Bevölkerung aus der Tschechoslowakei (The Expulsion of the German Population from Czechoslovakia, 1960)
- Friedrich der Grosse. Ein Königtum der Widersprüche, Ullstein 1983 (engl: Frederick the Great, Longman publ. 1999)
