= Verband der Historiker und Historikerinnen Deutschlands =

German association of historians

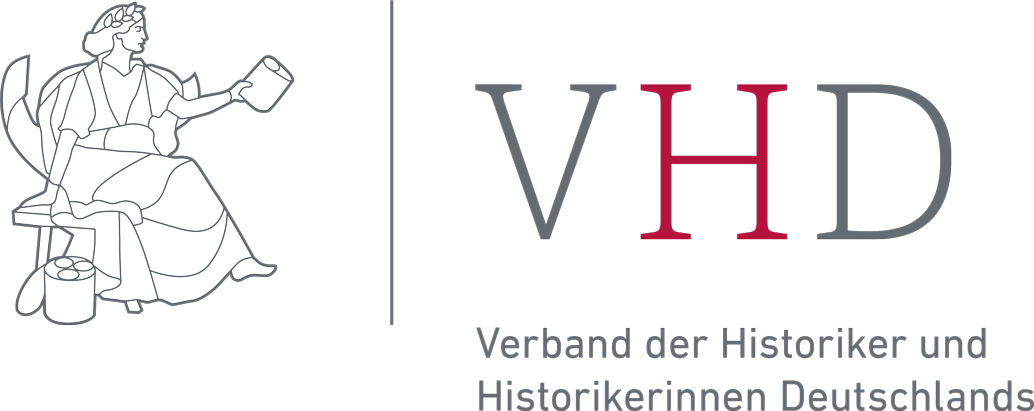
- Abbreviation: VHD
- Established: 1895, 1948
- Type: Registered association
- Purpose: Organizational support for historical scholarship, representation of German historians to the public, especially the international historical community
- Headquarters: Frankfurt am Main
- Region served: Germany
- Field: History
- Members: 3000+
- Official language: German
- Vorsitzende ("Chairwoman"): Antje Flüchter
- Website: VHD's homepage
- Formerly called: Verband Deutscher Historiker

The Verband der Historiker und Historikerinnen Deutschlands e. V. ("Association of Germany's Historians"; VHD for short), often also called Deutscher Historikerverband ("German Historian Association"), founded in 1895 as Verband Deutscher Historiker ("Association of German Historians"), is with more than 3000 members the biggest German association of full-time historians.

== Organization ==
The Verband der Historiker und Historikerinnen Deutschlands, according to charter, deals with the "organizational support for historical scholarship, representation of German historians to the public, especially the international historical community". Its most important undertaking is to organize the Tag der Geschichtswissenschaft ("Conference of Historical Studies"; known until 2025 as Historikertag, or "Historians' Conference"), which is held every other year, and which regularly draws several thousand participants, thus being reputed to be Germany's biggest academic conference in the humanities. Furthermore, the VHD represents its members' interests in the field of politics, especially with regard to education and science policy. The VHD currently comprises eight expert working groups: Applied History/Public History; World Regional and Global History; Digital Historical Studies; Early Modern History; International History; State History; History of Childhood; and Social Data and Contemporary History.

Heading the VHD is a twenty-member board, to which further selected or delegated representatives also belong, alongside the leadership. The selection comes about cyclically at the Conference of Historical Studies, and those so chosen serve for a term of no more than six years. Delegates are sent by the Verband der Geschichtslehrer Deutschlands ("Association of Germany's History Teachers"), the Verband deutscher Archivarinnen und Archivare ("Association of German Archivists"), along with a representative of the Gesamtverein der deutschen Geschichts- und Altertumsvereine ("General Association of German Historical and Antiquarian Societies"). The board sets the conference's location as well as its sections, and determines who wins the prizes that the VHD awards for outstanding dissertations and habilitation treatises.

The VHD's leadership is made up of a chairman/chairwoman, a deputy chairman/chairwoman, a secretary, and a treasurer. The VHD's chairwoman since 2025 has been the historian from Bielefeld, Antje Flüchter.

On 1 October 2009, to further the VHD's professionalization, an office was opened on the Campus Westend at the University of Frankfurt am Main.

The VHD represents Germany's diverse male and female historians at the International Committee of Historical Sciences (ICHS). The VHD is also, as a co-applicant, part of the major project NFDI4Memory, to actively shape, along with others, the digital future of historical studies, while bringing to the project historians' interests.

== History ==
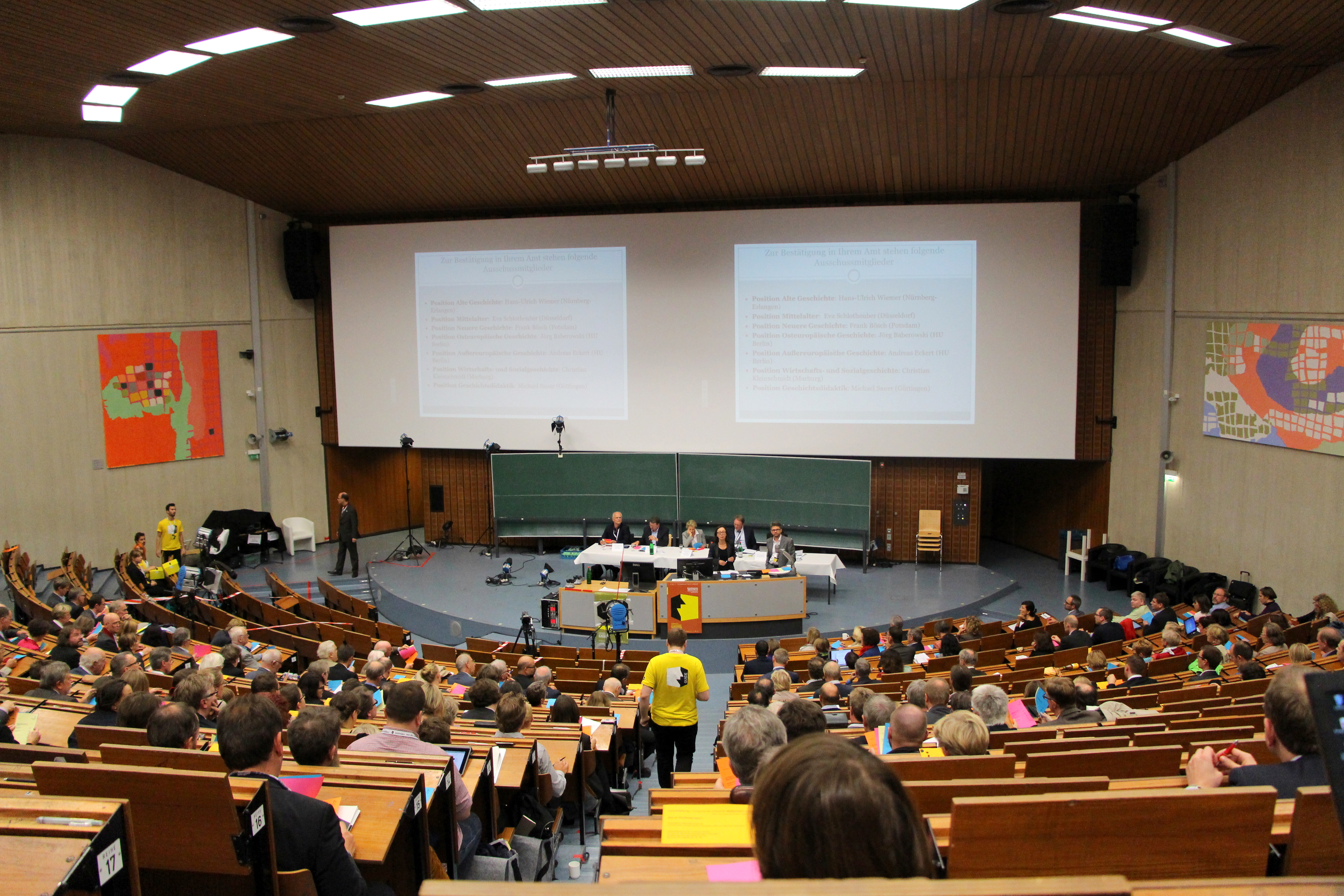
Membership meeting at the Göttingen Historikertag in 2014

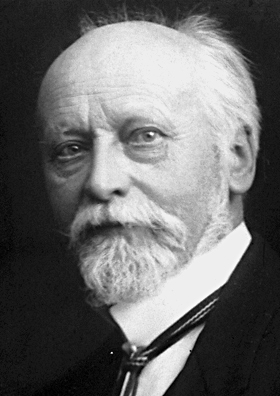
Ludwig Quidde

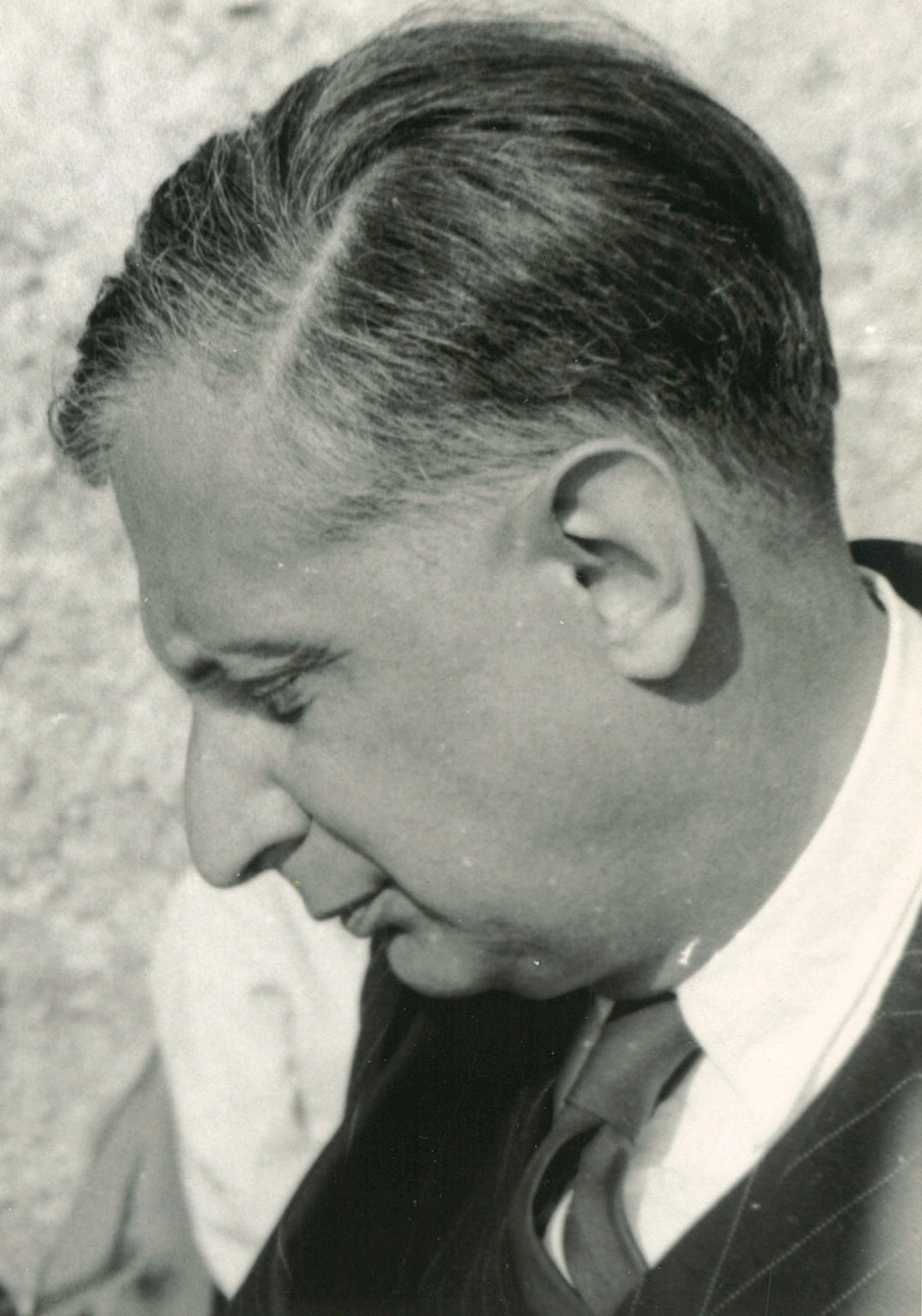
Hermann Heimpel

The "First Meeting of German Historians" with scientists and educational practitioners took place in Munich at Easter in 1893 to present a united voice of opposition to Prussia's new 1892 history curriculum, which, at Kaiser Wilhelm II's behest, sought to constrain the school subject into a nationalistic and anti-socialist direction. In 1895, the Verband Deutscher Historiker was founded in Frankfurt am Main, encouraged by, among others, Ludwig Quidde. Scholastic issues still played only a subordinate role within the Association, leading teachers to found the Verband Deutscher Geschichtslehrer ("German History Teachers' Association") in 1913. In the time of the Third Reich, the Historians' Association was led first by Karl Brandi from 1932 to 1937, and thereafter by Förderndes Mitglied der SS Walter Platzhoff.

Under Gerhard Ritter's leadership, a "founding committee" on which sat Hermann Heimpel, Hermann Aubin, and Herbert Grundmann, initiated the Association's revival, with a new name, in late 1948. The Historians' Association, founded in 1949 under Ritter's chairmanship, continued to place great importance on a "German nationally defined historical consciousness". The Historians' Association could claim until the mid-1950s to be a pan-German organization, but in 1958 in East Germany, the Historiker-Gesellschaft der DDR was established as a breakaway organization. In September 1990, the three-decade-long double existence of institutionalized historical studies in Germany came to an end with the Vereinigungs-Historikertag ("Unification Historians' Conference") in Bochum.

With the Resolution des Verbandes der Historiker und Historikerinnen Deutschlands zu gegenwärtigen Gefährdungen der Demokratie ("Resolution of the Association of Germany's Historians on Present Threats to Democracy"), passed on 27 September 2018, the VHD positioned itself openly for the first time on current political developments.

In 2021, the first digital Historikertag was held, as the COVID-19 pandemic prevented a public gathering.

=== Inclusion of women academics ===
As early as the 1950s, the odd woman academic was allowed to make a speech at the VHD, but it was not until the 1980 Historikertag in Würzburg that two women led sections of the conference: Irmgard Hantsche led a section on "History in Primary School", while Maria Alföldi led one on "Social History of Roman Imperial Times". Nevertheless, even today, men are predominant, and the VHD never had a chairwoman (as opposed to a chairman) until well into the 21st century (2016).

== Chairmen and chairwomen ==
Among the Association's chairmen before 1914 were not only German, but also some Austrian historians. Various academic disciplines were taken into account in the selections, with the majority being those who taught either mediaeval or modern history. Since 1988, the term has always lasted four years (with one exception). A woman was chosen for the position for the first time in 2016.

- 1895–1896: Hans von Zwiedineck-Südenhorst (modern historian)
- 1896–1898: Felix Stieve (modern historian)
- 1898–1900: Georg Kaufmann (mediaeval and modern historian)
- 1900–1902: Dietrich Schäfer (modern historian)
- 1902–1903: Erich Marcks (modern historian)
- 1903–1904: Oswald Redlich (mediaeval historian)
- 1904–1906: Georg von Below (mediaeval historian)
- 1906–1907: Gerhard Seeliger (mediaeval historian)
- 1907–1909: Harry Bresslau (mediaeval historian)
- 1909–1911: Karl Brandi (mediaeval historian)
- 1911–1913: Emil von Ottenthal (mediaeval historian)
- 1913–1922: Joseph Hansen (mediaeval and modern historian)
- 1922–1924: Georg Küntzel (modern historian)
- 1924–1926: Hermann Reincke-Bloch (mediaeval historian)
- 1926–1928: Wilhelm Erben (mediaeval historian)
- 1928–1930: Robert Holtzmann (mediaeval historian)
- 1930–1932: Friedrich Oertel (ancient historian)
- 1932–1937: Karl Brandi (mediaeval historian)
- 1937–1945: Walter Platzhoff (mediaeval historian)
- 1949–1953: Gerhard Ritter (modern historian)
- 1953–1958: Hermann Aubin (mediaeval and East European historian)
- 1958–1962: Hans Rothfels (modern historian)
- 1962–1967: Karl Dietrich Erdmann (modern historian)
- 1967–1972: Theodor Schieder (modern historian)
- 1972–1976: Werner Conze (modern historian)
- 1976–1980: Gerhard A. Ritter (modern historian)
- 1980–1988: Christian Meier (ancient historian)
- 1988–1992: Wolfgang J. Mommsen (modern historian)
- 1992–1996: Lothar Gall (modern historian)
- 1996–2000: Johannes Fried (mediaeval historian)
- 2000–2004: Manfred Hildermeier (East European historian)
- 2004–2008: Peter Funke (ancient historian)
- 2008–2012: Werner Plumpe (economic historian)
- 2012–2016: Martin Schulze Wessel (East European historian)
- 2016–2021: Eva Schlotheuber (mediaeval historian)
- 2021–2025: Lutz Raphael (modern historian)
- since 19 September 2025: Antje Flüchter (modern historian)
Heads of the VHD board

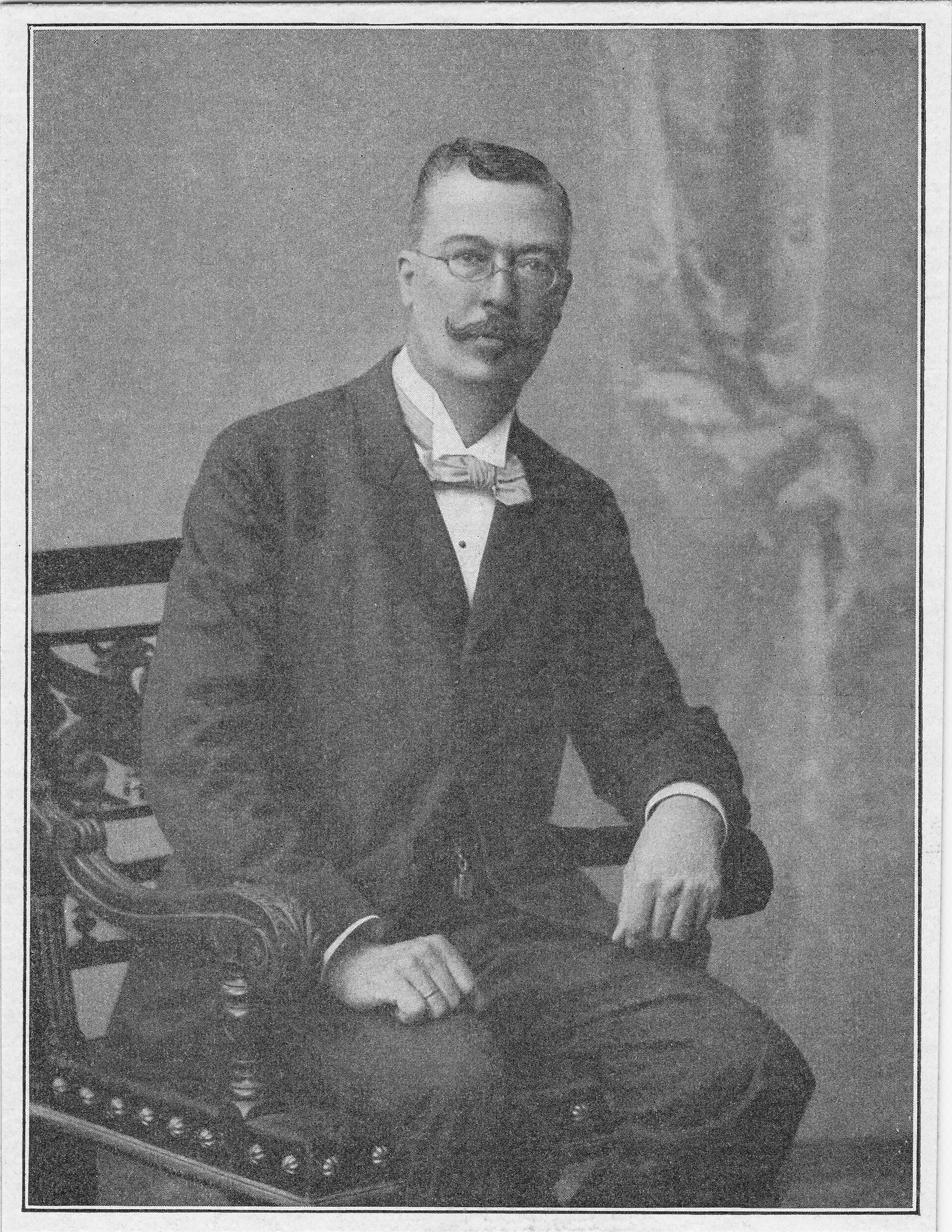
Hans von Zwiedineck-Südenhorst

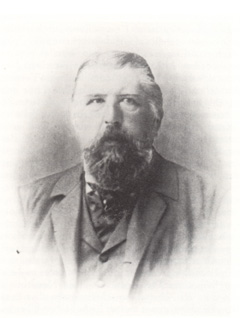
Felix Stieve

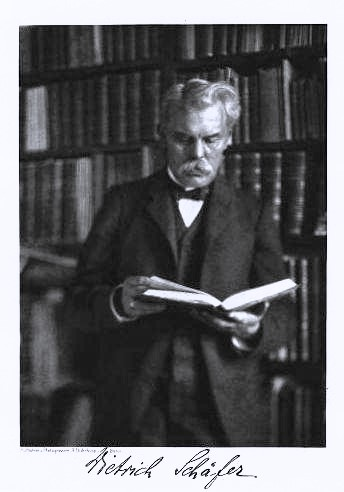
Dietrich Schäfer

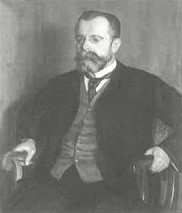
Erich Marcks

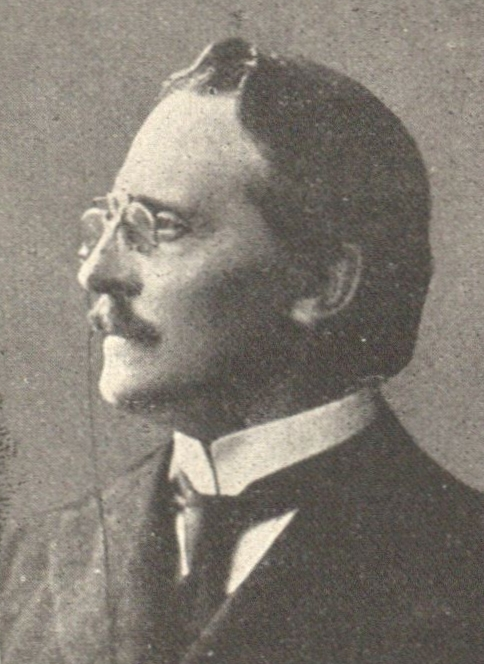
Oswald Redlich

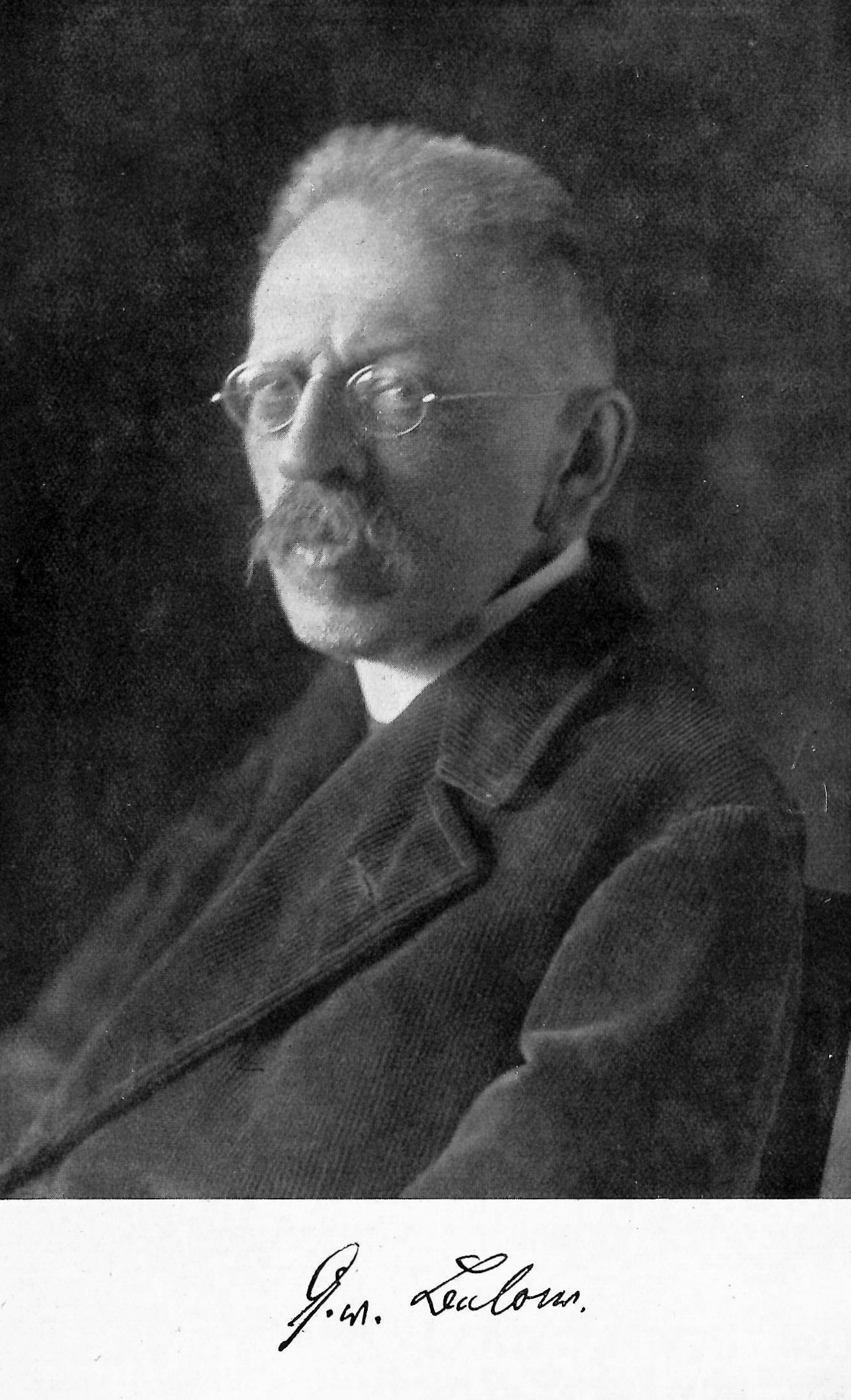
Georg von Below

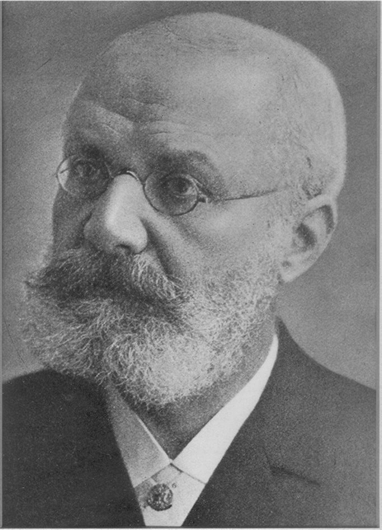
Harry Bresslau

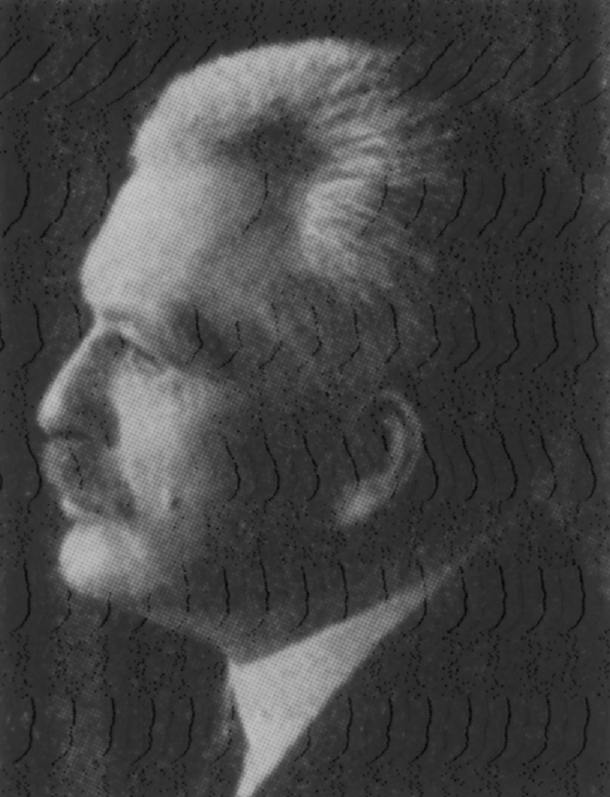
Karl Brandi

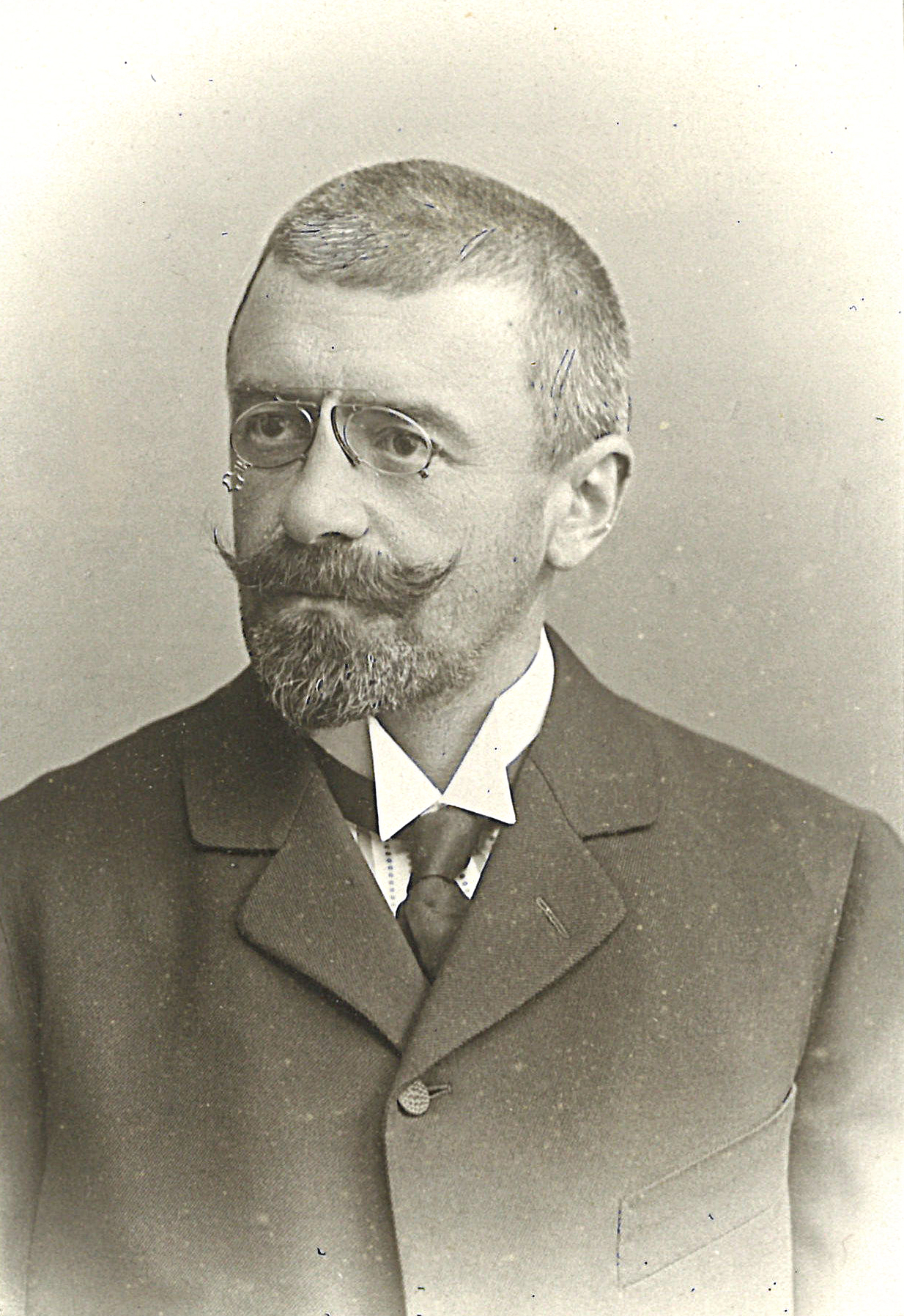
Emil von Ottenthal

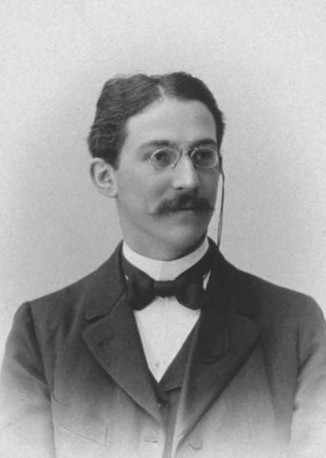
Hermann Reincke-Bloch

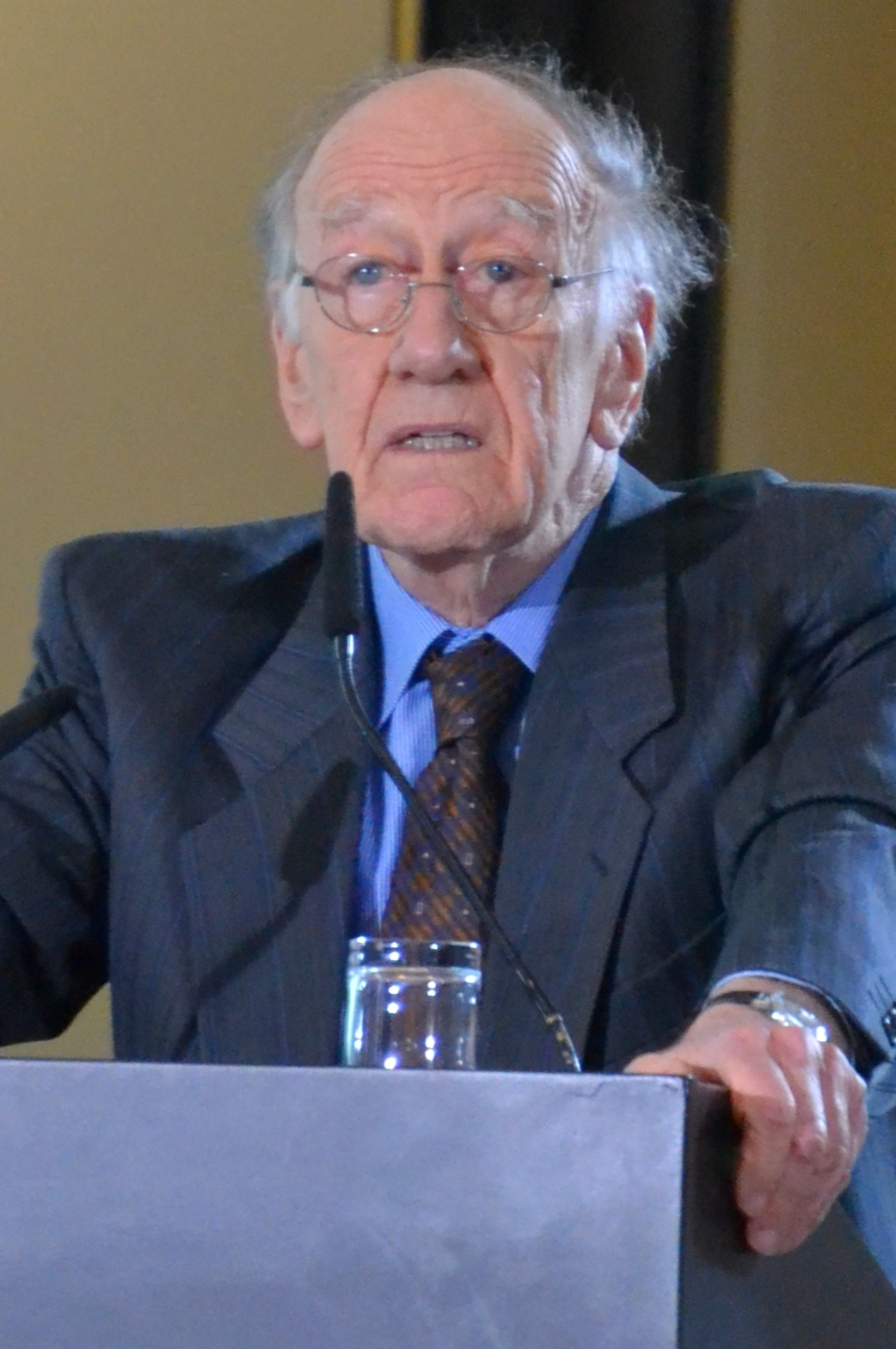
Christian Meier

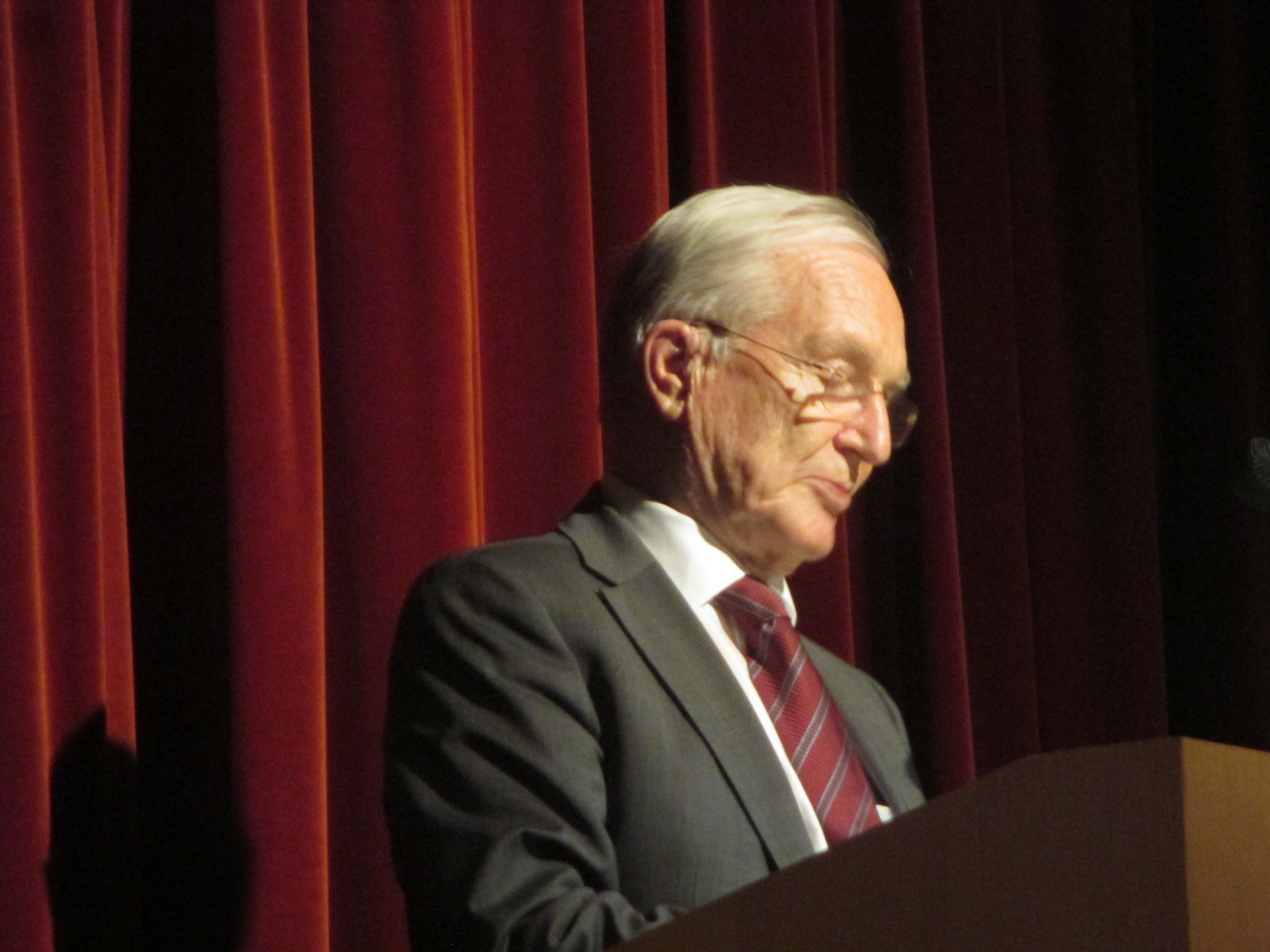
Lothar Gall

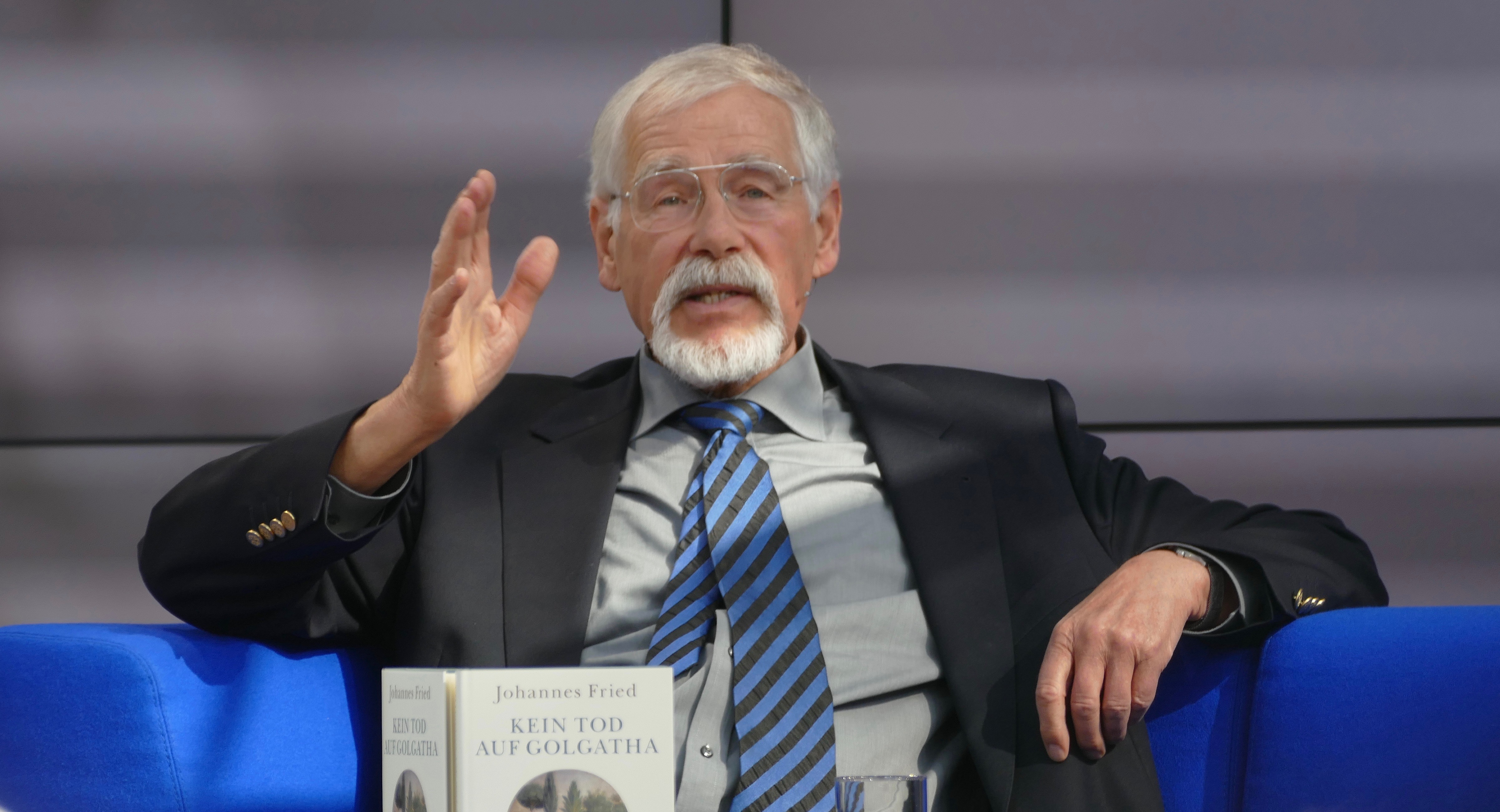
Johannes Fried

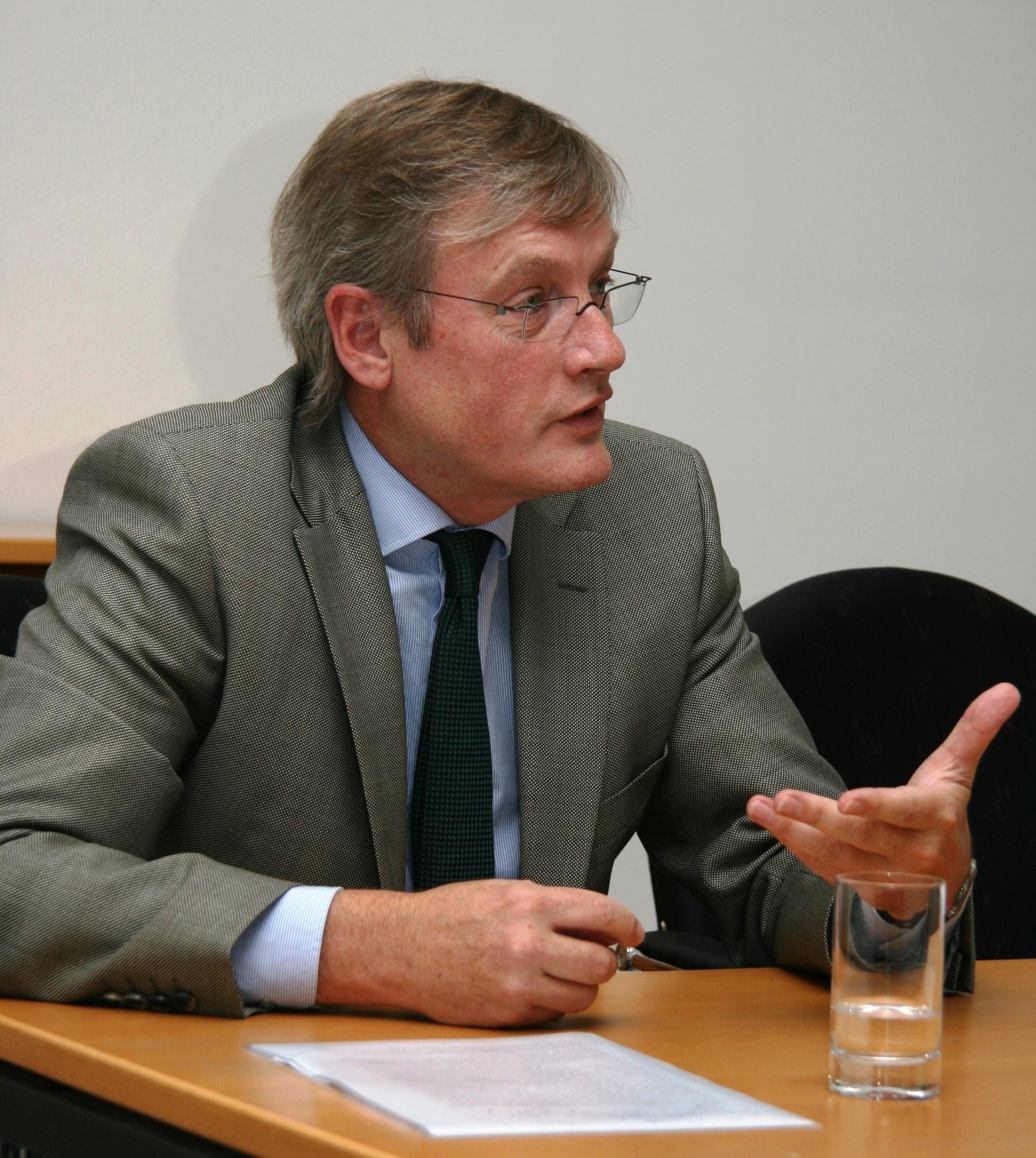
Werner Plumpe

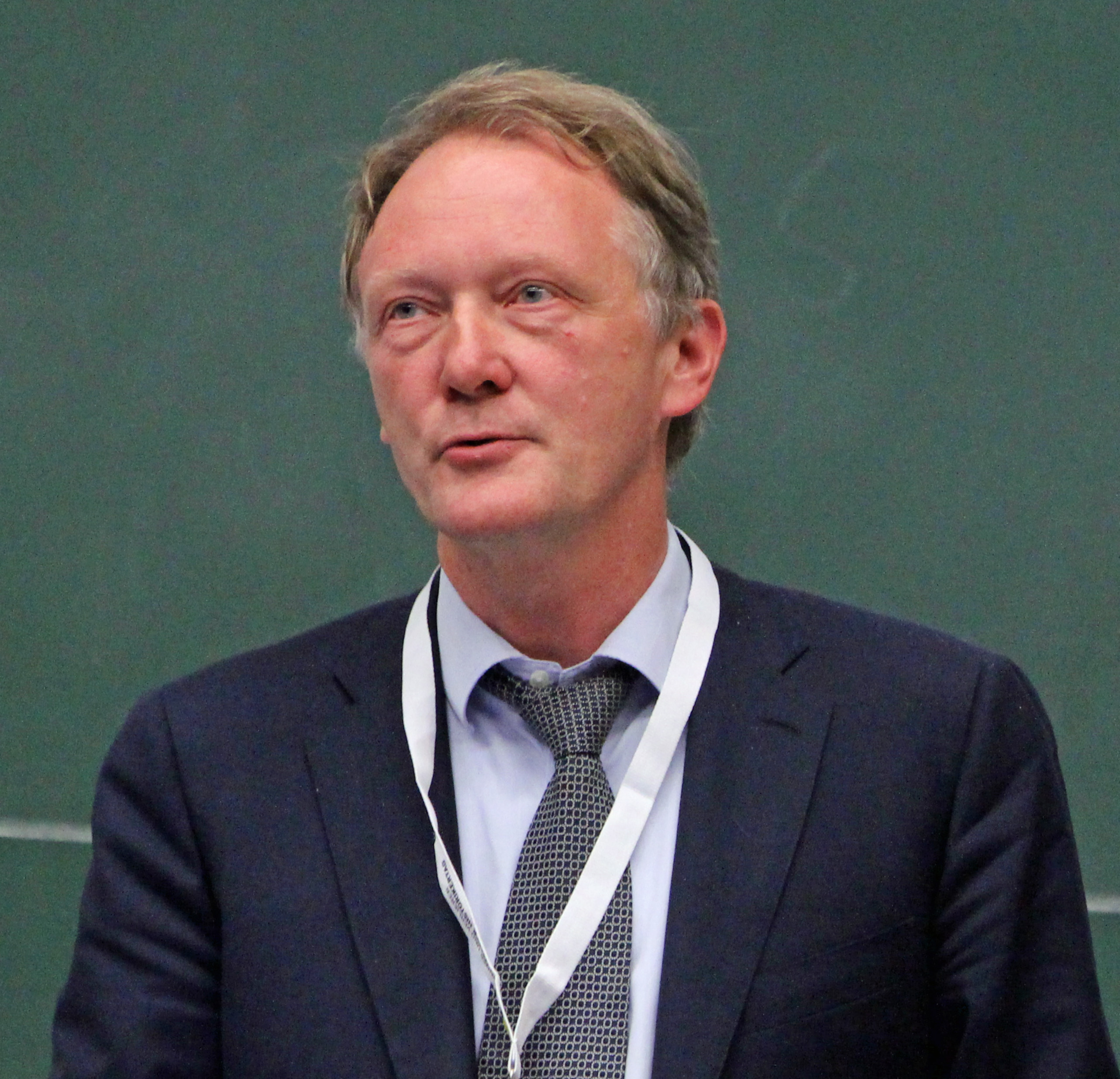
Martin Schulze Wessel

== Conference of Historical Studies ==
Every other year, the VHD holds the Tag der Geschichtswissenschaft ("Conference of Historical Studies") in cooperation with the Verband der Geschichtslehrerinnen und -lehrer Deutschlands e. V. ("Association of Germany's History Teachers"; VGD). The hosts are representatives of the subject of history at various German universities. With its more than 2,500 participants, this Historikertag is Germany's biggest professional conference and also one of Europe's biggest. Because of its size and importance for the field of history, the Historikertag regularly attracts great public interest. The keynote speech is often given by prominent politicians, such as the current Federal President or the Chancellor (Walter Scheel spoke in 1976, and Helmut Schmidt in 1978). Many specialist sections, panel discussions, working groups, and a place- and theme-specific supporting programme promote scientific exchange and networking among teaching and researching staff at universities, non-university research institutes, schools, and more. Within the framework of the academic congress, three prizes are awarded: the Hedwig-Hintze-Preis, the Carl-Erdmann-Preis, and the Peter-Haber-Preis.

== Awards ==
The VHD awards distinctions for outstanding research every other year on the occasion of the Conference of Historical Studies. The Hedwig-Hintze-Preis is awarded for the best dissertation in the general field of historical studies. The Carl-Erdmann-Preis is awarded for the best habilitation. The Peter-Haber-Preis, which is given jointly by the VHD along with the Deutsches Historisches Institut Paris and the AG Digitale Geschichtswissenschaft ("Digital Historical Studies Working Group"), is awarded for outstanding projects in the field of digital historical studies.

=== Hedwig-Hintze-Preis ===
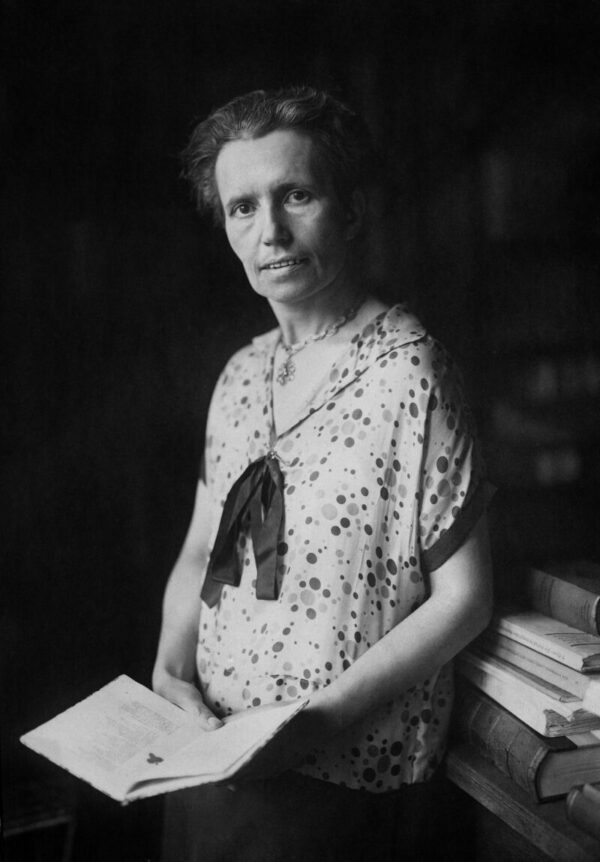
Hedwig Hintze

The Association has been awarding the Hedwig-Hintze-Preis for outstanding dissertations since 2004. The prize itself was named after the modern historian Hedwig Hintze, who, as a Jew, had to flee Germany in 1939, but then, under circumstances that are not altogether clear, died in exile in the Netherlands. The distinction is for outstanding dissertations in the general field of historical studies by recent graduates. The prize brings with it a sum of €7000. The following have been awarded this prize:

- 2025: Cosima Götz
- 2023: Johannes Czakai
- 2021: Anna Catharina Hofmann and Irina Saladin
- 2018: Katharina Kreuder-Sonnen
- 2016: Nadine Amsler Weber and Joseph Lemberg
- 2014: Eva Maria Gajek
- 2012: Jan Hennings and Julia Tischler
- 2010: Anne Sudrow
- 2008: Martin Lücke and Victor Walser
- 2006: Carola Dietze
- 2004: Astrid M. Eckert
- 2002: Stefan-Ludwig Hoffmann

=== Carl-Erdmann-Preis ===
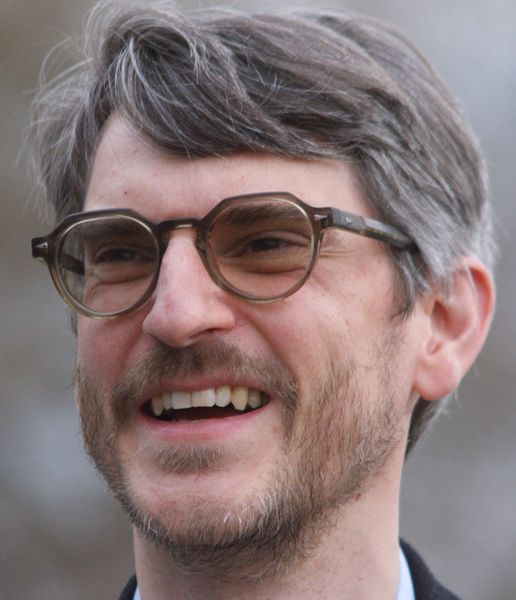
Romedio Schmitz-Esser

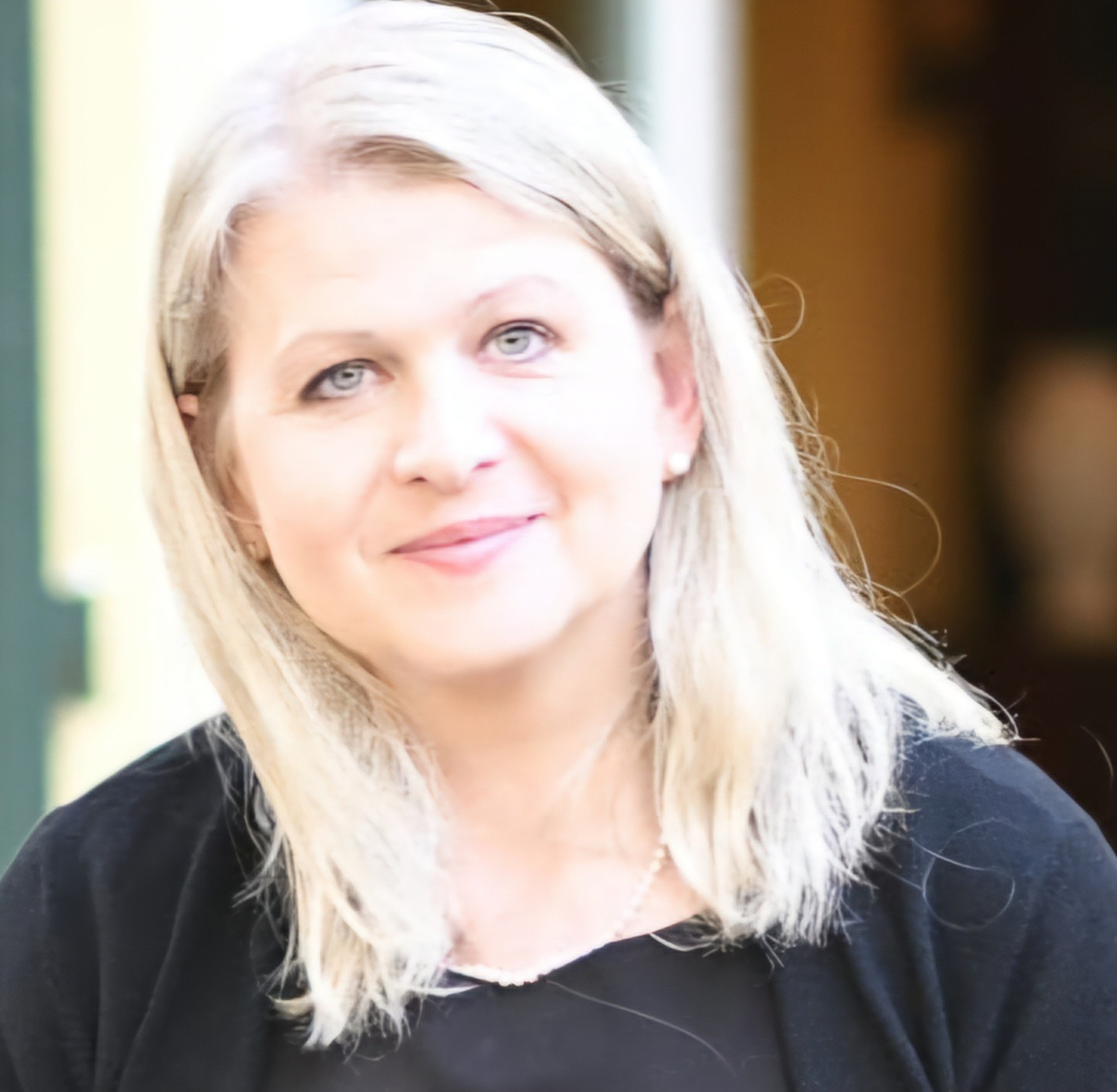
Elke Seefried

The VHD has also been awarding – likewise since 2004 – the Carl-Erdmann-Preis for outstanding habilitations in the general field of historical studies. This prize is named after the mediaevalist Carl Erdmann, a resolute opponent of National Socialism. It replaced the Preis des Verbandes der Historiker Deutschlands für herausragende Arbeiten des wissenschaftlichen Nachwuchses ("Association of Germany's Historians Prize for Outstanding Work by Young Academics"; 1990–2010). Distinguished every other year by this prize are outstanding habilitations in the general field of historical studies. The prize brings with it a sum of €8000.

The following have been awarded this prize:

- 2025: Susanne Schregel
- 2023: Felix Römer
- 2021 (postponed owing to COVID-19 pandemic): Marc Buggeln
- 2018: Rüdiger Bergien and Fabian Klose
- 2016: Simone Derix and Romedio Schmitz-Esser
- 2014: Elke Seefried and Lars Behrisch
- 2012: Ulrike Weckel

=== Peter-Haber-Preis ===
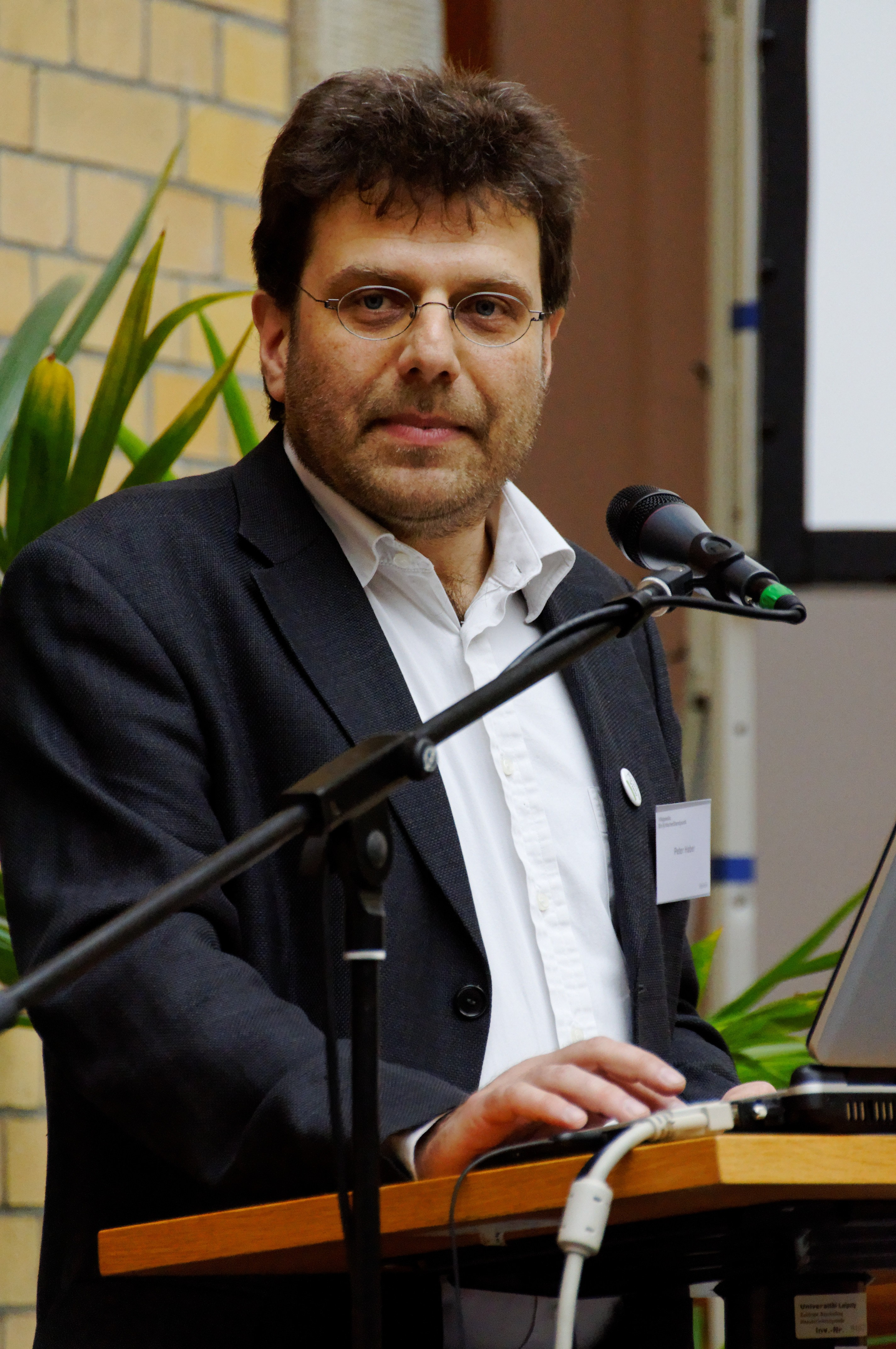
Peter Haber

Since 2021, the Peter-Haber-Preis has been awarded for digital historical studies. The distinction memorializes the Swiss historian Peter Haber. Awarded thus far have been the following:

- 2025: Ann Lauren Osthof, Jenny Gabel (first place), Fernanda Alvares Freire (second place), Philipp Scheinert (third place)
- 2023: Sarah Ondraszek (first place), Joëlle Weis (second place), Annika Merklein (third place)
- 2021: Jana Keck (first place), Tessa Gengnagel (second place), Justine Diemke, Werner Rieß (third place)

== See also ==
- Deutscher Historikertag

== VHD publications ==
The Historians' Association has published several volumes of reports on the Historians' Conferences. Further, informational booklets (VHD-Journal) appear irregularly for the Association's members.

- Stefan Weinfurter, Frank Martin Siefarth (publisher): Geschichte als Argument. 41. Deutscher Historikertag in München 17. bis 20. September 1996. Berichtsband., Munich 1997, ISBN 3-486-56327-0.
- Marie-Luise Recker (publisher): Intentionen – Wirklichkeiten. 42. Deutscher Historikertag in Frankfurt am Main 8. bis 11. September 1998. Berichtsband. Oldenbourg, Munich 1999, ISBN 3-486-56442-0.
- Max Kerner (publisher): Eine Welt – Eine Geschichte? 43. Deutscher Historikertag in Aachen 26. bis 29. September 2000. Berichtsband. Oldenbourg, Munich 2001, ISBN 3-486-56614-8.
- Andreas Ranft, Markus Meumann (publishers): Traditionen – Visionen. 44. Deutscher Historikertag in Halle an der Saale vom 10. bis 13. September 2002. Berichtsband. Oldenbourg, Munich 2004, ISBN 3-486-56769-1.
- Gerhard Fouquet, Arnd Reitemeier (publishers): Kommunikation und Raum. 45. Deutscher Historikertag in Kiel 14. bis 17. September 2004. Berichtsband. Wachholtz, Neumünster 2005, ISBN 3-529-02449-X.
- Clemens Wischermann et al. (publishers): GeschichtsBilder. 46. Deutscher Historikertag in Konstanz 2006. Berichtsband. UVK, Konstanz 2007.
- Martin Jehne et al. (publishers): Ungleichheiten. 47. Deutscher Historikertag in Dresden 2008. Berichtsband. Vandenhoeck & Ruprecht, Göttingen 2009.
- Gabriele Metzler, Michael Wildt (publishers): Über Grenzen. 48. Deutscher Historikertag in Berlin 2010. Berichtsband. Vandenhoeck & Ruprecht, Göttingen 2012.
