= Erich Keyser =

German historian (1893–1968)

Erich Keyser (12 October 1893 – 21 February 1968) was a Nazi activist and far-right nationalist historian connected with the anti-Polish ideology of Ostforschung and the racist Volkisch movement. He supported German expansion in Central and Eastern Europe and was involved with the planning of ethnic cleansing by the Third Reich during the Second World War. After 1945 he exploited the Cold War to promote the interests of German nationalism and chauvinism in his historical writing.

== Early life ==
Keyser studied history in Freiburg, Halle and Berlin. He published his doctoral thesis in 1918, which dealt with the earliest settlement and economic history of Danzig.

== Interwar years ==
Keyser publicly espoused nationalist theories and hatred towards Poles.

In 1926 he created the State Regional Museum of Danzig History in Danzig-Oliva which he led until 1945. It was responsible for pursuing studies on direct requests from SS Reichsfuhrer Heinrich Himmler.

Keyser also took part in writing the 1926 German Settlement Land in the East collection, which aimed to justify German claims to Eastern Europe and was part of "emotional" narrative writing that idealized the concept of Drang nach Osten.

Among Keyser's key views was the desire to classify the historical nature of the populations "according to physiological and psychological characteristics of racial make up of the population and its groups". In such works he included psychological study of national character traits which led him to support Rassenforschung (racial studies). He was especially interested in the "racial categorization of the current population of Germany and in the racial classification of psychological remains from the centuries of the past". He considered the Germans the only representatives of historical life in Prussia and supported the volkisch movement. Keyser imagined a racial and biological "essence" uniting Germans throughout history that supported irredentism of German nationalists. In his view the German "volk" needed to expand or perish. Like other historians from the volkisch movement he expressed overt racism and anti-semitism.

In 1933 Erich Keyser joined the NSDAP and soon became a virulent Nazi, active in supporting the Nuremberg racial laws.

In 1938, Keyser openly placed the history of the area along the Vistula river at the service of political ideology. With his concepts of so-called "Weichselland" he created a myth of a historical region that never existed. Additionally he tried to prove a continuous Germanic settlement of this region, using such ideas as Germanic "Norsemen" and "men of the Nordic race" which he claimed infused the region with a "unified characteristics".

Another basic principle of his work was the construction of social and racial opposition between Germans and the Jews supposedly dating back to the Middle Ages.

== Second World War ==
He was tasked with directing a research unit for regional and ethnic studies that was founded in 1939. This unit was linked to NOFG ( "Die Nord- und Ostdeutsche Forschungsgemeinschaft") headed by the Nazi Albert Brackmann and dedicated to the cause of ethnic reallocation of land in eastern territories. Alongside other Nazis he was responsible for the planning and implementation of re-population policies in territories occupied Nazi Germany and contemplated ways in which Poles unsuitable for Germanization could be efficiently removed in a quick manner.

Keyser was directly involved in Germanization attempts aimed at the Polish population in territories Nazi Germany annexed from Poland and formed in the so-called Danzig-West Prussia region. In autumn 1940 Keyser attended the conference on "History of Population" in Berlin, representing the Office of Regional Studies in Danzig, alongside other leading Nazi scholars such as Hermann Aubin and Theodor Schieder. Part of Keyser's report concerned a project regarding germanizing names in territories annexed from Poland which were formed into Reichsgau's, while another concerned the history of population along Vistula River with the purpose of assisting with future population policy measures. Keyser along with other Nazi researches worked on compiling the German National List (Deutsche Volksliste DVL), and calculated that approximately 30,000 Polish families should be Germanized.

Despite the war, Keyser continued to expand his studies, by increasing the number of pages in his book about population history and adding in second edition in 1941 such section headings as "What is the Nature of the German People" and "People and Population". A new section called "People and Race" was introduced in third edition of 1943, while section "Aliens in Germany" discussed "the first appearance of the Jews", "National Socialist population policy" and "the immortality of the German people".

In 1943, Keyser supported involvement of German historians and researchers in Nazi population policies and idea of connection between studies of "race" and demographics stating that "The will of the German people to cleanse itself of undesirable racial components" was the driving force behind such actions. In 1944 when Nazi Germany was losing the war, he praised Adolf Hitler in a Nazi magazine "Wille and Macht" ("Will and Power") stating that "The victory of the German troops of all Germanic tribes under the leadership of Adolf Hitler banished, in autumn 1939, the ghost of Versailles".

By April 1944 Keyser started working together with the Institute for Racial Studies of the Danzig Medical Academy where he carried out "ethnic and racial investigations" on German colonists located in camps near the city and started working on studies regarding Kashubians.

== Cold War ==
Like other racist and nationalist ideologues of the Nazi era, Keyser managed to enter the post-war academic scene in West Germany without serious obstacles, and like others he adopted his views from the Nazi period into a rhetoric fitting the Cold War. The traces and influence of volkisch thinking are still evident in his post-war work. He outlined new objectives of the German Ostforschung in 1952 in order to legitimize traditional German chauvinism by depicting Germans as bringers of order and development in Eastern Europe in concert with other European nations. This attempt had obvious connections to the past and tried to put Germans and Western community against an undefined "East".

He became responsible for the Herder Institute placing its work into the context of Ostforschung and openly declaring that its mission was to change the map of Europe and Germany, stating "Germany does not end at the Elbe, Oder or at the Vistula"; the Institute openly and proudly demonstrated its continuity with past research under Nazi regime. Only after his death did the Herder institute gradually begin to escape from ethnocentric study of history and started studying ethnic groups in the region on a more equal basis.

== See also ==
- Lebensraum
