= Baltische Historische Kommission =

Organization based in Germany

Baltic Historical Commission
- Baltische Historische Kommission
- Abbreviation: BHK
- Formation: 28 July 1982; 44 years ago
- Type: Registered association
- Headquarters: Göttingen
- Location: Lower Saxony
- Region served: Baltic
- Official language: German
- Chair: Karsten Brüggemann (2023-present)
- Funding: Federal Government of Germany
- Website: balt-hiko.de

Baltische Historische Kommission ('Baltic Historical Commission'; abbreviated BHK) is an organization which deals with history related to Baltic Germans/Germany and Baltic states. BHK is located in Göttingen, Germany. Since 2007, BHK's chairman is Matthias Thumser.

BHK was established in 1951 in Göttingen.

BHK publishes several publications.

BHK organizes Baltischen Historikertreffen ('Baltic Historians Meetings').

As of 2020, BHK has about 100 full and 30 corresponding members.
