= Collegium Carolinum =

Collegium Carolinum may refer to

- Karolinum the historic building of the Charles University in Prague
- Carolinum, Zürich, the predecessor of the University of Zurich
- Collegium Carolinum (Kassel), a former research and teaching institution in Kassel, operated 1709–1785
- TU Braunschweig in Germany was founded in 1745 as Collegium Carolinum
- The dissolved German Charles-Ferdinand University in Prague was continued in Munich as Collegium Carolinum (1956)

== See also ==
- Gymnasium Carolinum (Osnabrück)
