= Hermann Aubin =

German historian

- Born: 23 September 1885; Reichenberg, Austria-Hungary
- Died: 11 March 1969 (aged 83); Freiburg, Germany
- Awards: Grand Cross of the Order of Merit of the Federal Republic of Germany (1955)

Academic background
- Education: University of Freiburg

Academic work
- Discipline: History
- Institutions: University of Breslau; University of Hamburg; University of Freiburg

Hermann Aubin (23 September 1885 – 11 March 1969) was an Austrian-German historian.

== Biography ==
Hermann Aubin was born in Reichenberg, Austria on 23 December 1885. His father was a wealthy factory owner. The Aubin family were descended from French Huguenots who had settled in Frankfurt in the 16th century AD. Aubin graduated at the top of his class from the gymnasium at Reichenberg in July 1904, and subsequently volunteered for a year as a soldier in the Austro-Hungarian Army. From 1905, Aubin studied history and economics at the Ludwig-Maximilians-Universität München and the University of Freiburg. He obtained a PhD at the University of Freiburg in 1910 under the supervision of Georg von Below.

After obtaining his PhD, Aubin lectured on history at Düsseldorf University. During World War I, Aubin served as an officer in the Austro-Hungarian Army on a variety of fronts. He obtained his habilitation in 1916 under the supervision of Aloys Schulte. With the dismemberment of Austria-Hungary, Aubin became a German citizen. From 1920 onwards, Aubin taught history at the University of Bonn. Aubin was hit hard economically by the hyperinflation of the 1920s, and the poor economic situation in Germany prevented him from gaining a full professorship. During this time, Aubin contemplated leaving the history profession. In 1925, he was appointed a lecturer at the University of Giessen. In 1929, he was appointed a professor of history at the University of Breslau.

During the Third Reich era, Aubin was a supporter of German efforts for eastward expansion, particularly the invasion of Poland in 1939. Aubin was a leader in the German academic tradition of Ostforschung an area of research meant to provide intellectual justification for German expansion into its Eastern frontier. Aubin worked alongside historians such as Albert Brackmann in order to promote German resettlement in Poland. Aubin also worked in collaboration with the Generalgouvernment of Hans Frank in promoting German colonization.

At the end of World War II, Aubin was drafted into the Volksturm and fought in the Siege of Breslau. In 1946, Aubin was appointed Professor of Medieval and Modern History at the University of Hamburg. From 1955, he was an honorary professor of history at the University of Freiburg. After the war, Aubin founded and led a number of scholarly organizations. He was the editor of Zeitschrift für Ostmitteleuropa-Forschung from 1952 to 1966. Aubin played a leading role in shaping the field of history in West Germany. From 1953 to 1958, he was the chairman of the Verband der Historiker und Historikerinnen Deutschlands. On his 70th birthday in December 1955, Aubin received the Grand Cross of the Order of Merit of the Federal Republic of Germany. He died in Freiburg on 11 March 1969.

== Sources ==
- Eduard Mühle: Für Volk und deutschen Osten. Der Historiker Hermann Aubin und die deutsche Ostforschung (= Schriften des Bundesarchivs. Bd. 65). Droste, Düsseldorf 2005, ISBN 3-7700-1619-X.
- Axel Schildt: Aubin, Hermann. In: Franklin Kopitzsch, Dirk Brietzke (Hrsg.): Hamburgische Biografie. Band 6. Wallstein, Göttingen 2012, ISBN 978-3-8353-1025-4, S. 20–22.
- Hans-Erich Volkmann: Hermann Aubin. In: Michael Fahlbusch, Ingo Haar, Alexander Pinwinkler (Hrsg.): Handbuch der völkischen Wissenschaften. Akteure, Netzwerke, Forschungsprogramme. Unter Mitarbeit von David Hamann. 2. vollständig überarbeitete und erweiterte Auflage. Bd. 1, De Gruyter Oldenbourg, Berlin 2017, ISBN 978-3-11-042989-3, S. 55–59.
