= Volodymyr Potulnytskyi =

Ukrainian historian

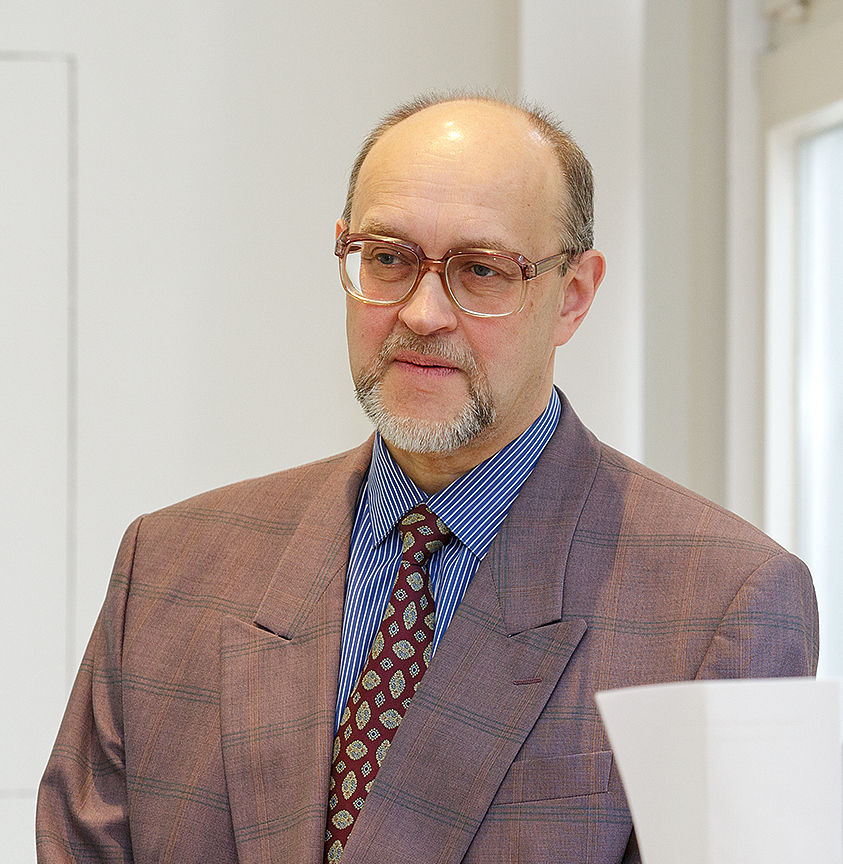
Volodymyr Potulnytskyi

Volodymyr Potulnytskyi (Ukrainian: Володимир Потульницький; birth July 6, 1958, Lviv) is a Ukrainian historian who specializes in European medieval history, Ukrainian political science, intellectual history, historiosophy and historiography of Eastern Europe.

== Education and teaching ==
Potulnytskyi studied at the historical faculty of Lviv University within the major Medieval European History and minors History of Early Modern Europe (1500—1815) from 1975 to 1980. In 1984, he presented at L'viv University his first thesis 'Political Culture of Creative Personality' and became candidate of science in philosophy. In 1989–1992, studied at the historical faculty of Kiev University within the major Modern Ukrainian History. In 1992, he defended his second thesis ‘The Concepts of Statehood in Ukrainian Historical and Political Science (1918—1939)’ and got a doctorate in ‘Ukrainian and Global History’.

From 1999 till 2002 was the professor of the Chair of Medieval Ukrainian History and Special Historical Disciples in the University of Lviv where he received the rank of full professor in 2002. From 1992 Potulnytskyi is working as Leading Research Fellow of the Department of Foreign Sources, M. Hruschevskyi Institute of Ukrainian Archeography and Source Studies, National Academy of Sciences of Ukraine.

== Career and Main Interests ==
Potulnytskyi's fields of research are Political theory, history of political thought, the history of ideologies, discourse history. He has published in Ukraine and abroad (Germany, Japan, Israel, Canada, Great Britain, Poland, Czech Republic), and in internationally leading journals, such as Jahrbücher für Geschichte Osteuropas, Zeitschrift für Ostmitteleuropa-Forschung, Acta Slavica Japonica, Journal of East- European Jewry Hebrew University of Jerusalem, Ukrains'kyi istorychnyj zurnal. He is also a founder of his own research school in historiosophy and intellectual history.

== Ukrainian Historian ==
Volodymyr Potulnytskyip has made contributions on the theoretical and historical aspects of the influences of the dominant nations (Germany, Russia, Poland) on the development of Ukrainian historical and political thought in the 18th-20th centuries. He was the first scholar in the post-soviet space to solve the problems of integrating country's own version of the past in global and European history with shedding a new light on the problems of Russo — Ukrainian, Polish — Ukrainian, German — Ukrainian and Jewish — Ukrainian Relations.

He has worked in the field of diplomatic history, and, incorporating in his last monograph the noval archival materials from Ukraine, Switzerland, USA, etc. was able to provide a concrete picture of diplomatic intercourse between former Het'man of Ukraine Pavlo Skoropadskyi, and German, Japanese, British military and political officials in the crucial years of 1926–1943.

== Research Awards ==
Potulnytskyi has been awarded National and International Fellowships of the Alexander von Humboldt Foundation, Fellowship of the Ministry of Education of Austria, Fellowship of the Ministry of Sciences of Japan, Jewish Memorial Foundation Fellowship in the United States of America, Research Fellowships of Harvard, Edmonton, Wien, Cologne, Hokkaido, Hebrew University of Jerusalem Universities and Herder Institute for Historical East and Central European Research in Marburg, Germany.

== Selected books and publications ==
=== Books ===
1. Історія української політології. Концепції державності в українській зарубіжній історико-політичній науці (History of Ukrainian Political Science: the Concepts of Statehood in Ukrainian Historical and Political Science Abroad) Київ «Либідь» 1992. 220 с.
2. Теорія української політології (Theory of Ukrainian Political Science) Київ «Либідь», 1993. 191 с.
3. Нариси з української політології (1819—1991) (Essays in Ukrainian Political Science 1819–1991) Київ: Либідь, 1994. 320 с.
4. Всесвітня історія і Україна: Iсторіософія світової і української історії 17-20 ст. (Global History and Ukraine: Historiosophy of Global and Ukrainian History in the Seventeenth — Twentieth Centuries. Київ: Либідь, 2002. 480 с.
5. Дипломатія Павла Скоропадського: Військово — дипломатичні стосунки гетьмана з острівними монархіями у 1926—1943 рр) (The Dyplomacy of Pavlo Skoropads'kyj: Military and Diplomatic Relations of Hetman with Great Britain and Japan in 1926–1943) — Харків, «Акта» 2014. — 312 c.
6. Корона і ціна. Історіософія династичної історії Центрально-Східної Європи в IX – XVIII ст. (The Crown and the Price. Historiosophy of the Dynastic History of East-Central Europe in the Ninth-Eighteenth Centuries). Львів: Видавничий дім «Наутілус», 2018. 328 с.

=== Major Articles ===
1. Наукова діяльність Михайла Грушевського в еміграції (1919—1924) (Research Activity of Mykhailo Hrushevs'kyi in Emigration (1919—1924) // Український історичний журнал. 1992. No..2. С.48-58.
2. Політична доктрина В'ячеслава Липинського (The Political Doctrine of Vjacheslav Lypyns'kyi) // Український історичний журнал. 1992. No..9. С.37-45.
3. Das ukrainische historische Denken im 19. und 20. Jahrhundert: Konzeptionen und Periodisierung //Jahrbücher für Geschichte Osteuropas. Stuttgart. No. 45 (1997) H.1, S. 2 — 30.
4. Deutsche Einflüsse auf die Entwicklung des historischen Denkens in der Ukraine im. 19 Jahrhundert // Zeitschrift für Ostmitteleuropa — Forschung. Marburg. 1997, No. 46 (4), S. 475—499.
5. The Image of Ukraine and Ukrainians in Russian Political Thought (1860—1945) // Acta Slavica Japonica, Tomus XVI. Sapporo. 1998. P. 1 — 29.
6. The Image of Russia and the Russians in Ukrainian Political Thought (1860—1945), in.: Quest for Models of Coexistence: National and Ethnic Dimensions of Changes in the Slavic Eurasian World. Ed. by K.Inoue and T.Uyama. Slavic Research Center, Hokkaido University. Sapporo, 1998. P. 163—195.
7. Українська та світова історична наука. Рефлексії на тему історичних перспектив домінуючих, споріднених і підкорених націй (російська, польська, німецька, турецька, єврейська та українська) в українському контексті) (Ukrainian and Global History. The Reflections about Historical Perspectives of the Dominant, Related and Subordinate Nations (Russian, Polish, German, Turkish, Jewish and Ukrainian) in Ukrainian Kontext) // Український історичний журнал 2000. №.1. С.3-20; №.2. С.27-47; №.3. С. 22-44; №.4. С.20-37.
8. Jews and Jewish Theme in Ukrainian Historical Thought, in.: Jews in Eastern Europe. Journal of the Centre For Research and Documentation of East European Jewry of the Hebrew University of Jerusalem. Givat — Ram, Jerusalem — Winter 2000 — No.3 (43). P. 5-36.
9. Інтелектуальні впливи Заходу на духовне життя української еліти в 17-18 століттях (The Intellectual Influences of the West on the Spiritual Life of Ukrainian Elite in the Seventeenth — Eighteenth Centuries) // Київська старовина 2001. №.1. С.3-14; №.2. С.3-16; №.3.С.3-9; №.4.С.3-12; №.5. С.3-10.
10. Хронологія історії України (Crnological Survey of Ukrainian History) // Світ науки. Львів, 2001.№.4. С.104-105; Львів 2002. №.5.С.104-105; №.6. С.104-105.
11. Політичні середовища міжвоєнної української політичної еміграції: організація, ідейні засади та моделі державотворення) (Political Milieus of Ukrainian Interwar Political Emigration: Organization, Ideological Principles and Models of State Building) // Політична історія України. ХХ століття. У шести томах — Київ 2004. Т.5. Українці за межами УРСР. Р.2. С. 93-281.
12. Інтеграція національної історії у світову в німецькій історіософії у першій половині 20 століття (Integration of National History into the Global history in German Historiosophy in the First Half of the Twentieth Century) // Український археографічний щорічник. Київ — Нью-Йорк 2004. Том 11/ 12. Нова серія. Вип. 8/9. С. 366—381.
13. Galician Identity in Ukrainian Historical and Political Thought // Galicia. A Multicultured Land. (Ed. by Chris Hann and Paul Robert Magocsi). Toronto — Buffalo — London 2005. pp. 83-103.
14. Історіософія Гердера як синтез раціоналізму і пієтизму та її вплив на українську і російську історіографію (The Historiosophical Vision of Johann Gottfried Herder as the Synthesis of Rationalism and Pietism and its Influences on the Ukrainian and Russian Historical Thought // Український археографічний щорічник. Київ 2006. Вип 10/11. С. 298–312.
15. Political Relations of Pavlo Skoropads'kyj with Japanese Military Imperial Authorities in 1928—1943 (on the Materials of the Personal Diary of Hetman) // Збірник матеріалів міжнародної конференції з локальної історії, проведеної Інститутом української археографії 29/30 вересня 2009 р. у м. Києві. Наукові записки Інституту археографії. Вип. 19. Книга II. Частина I. Київ 2009. pp. 371–376.
16. Історіософські ідеї античності (Греція) та середньовіччя (Іспанія) у творчості Михайла Драгоманова та В'ячеслава Липинського: порівняльний аналіз (Historiosophical Ideas of Antiquity (Ancient Greece) and Medieval Times (Late Medieval Spain) in Research Heritage of Ukrainian Historians and Political Thinkers Mychailo Drahomanov and Vjacheslav Lypyns'kyj: the Comparative Analysis) // Український археографічний щорічник. Київ 2012. Вип. 16 / 17. С. 256—268
17. Щодо дослідницьких пріоритетів у справі створення нового академічного синтезу української історії в контексті історії світової (About the Research Priorities in the Creation of New Academic Synthesis of Ukrainian History Case in the Global History Context) // Український історичний журнал. — 2014 — No..1 — С. 4-20.
18. Всесвітня історія: історичні та сучасні монархічні держави. Програма кандидатського іспиту з спеціальності 07.00.02 — «Всесвітня історія». Частини перша та друга. Національна Академія Наук України. Інститут української археографії та джерелознавства ім. М. С. Грушевського. (The Global History: Historical and Modern Monarchies. The Programme of Ph.D. Exams in Global History. Parts I, II. National Academy of Sciences of Ukraine. Institute of Ukrainian Archeography and Source Studies). Київ 2014. 165 с.
19. Toward the History of Political Relations of Ukrainian Monarchial Emigration with British Ruling Circles in 1930s // Ucraina Magna. Ukrainian Political Emigration in the Twentieth Century: the Experience of Cultural Self-Presenting and Self — Statement in the Western World. Published by M.S.Hruschevsky Institute of Ukrainian Archeography and Source Studies of the National Academy of Sciences of Ukraine. — Kyiv 2016. — pp. 238–249.
20. Створення Омеляном Пріцаком кафедри історіософії у Київському університеті у 1992—1994 роках та її значення (The Creation of the Chair of Historiosophy at the Kiev University in 1992—1994 by Omeljan Pritsak and its Significance) // Український археографічний щорічник Київ 2016. Т.22/23. Нова серія. Випуск 19/20. С.362-379.
21. Konservative Bewegung der galizischen westukrainischen traditionellen Eliten vor dem ersten Weltkrieg und im Laufe der ersten Weltkrieges // Славістична збірка. Інститут української археографії та джерелознавства НАН України. Вип. III. Київ 2017. – С.322-333.
22. Зарубіжні відрядження молодих науковців Київського університету святого Володимира у 1870-ті роки як засіб формування історика (Overseas Trips of Young Scientists of Kyiv Saint Volodymyr University in the 1870s as Means of Forming Historians // Ейдос. Альманах теорії та історії історичної науки. Національна Академія Наук України. Інститут історії України. Київ 2017. Вип. 9. С. 177–195.
