= Otto Hintze =

German historian

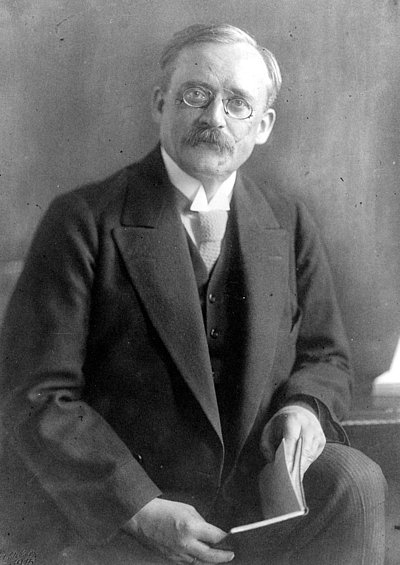
Otto Hintze

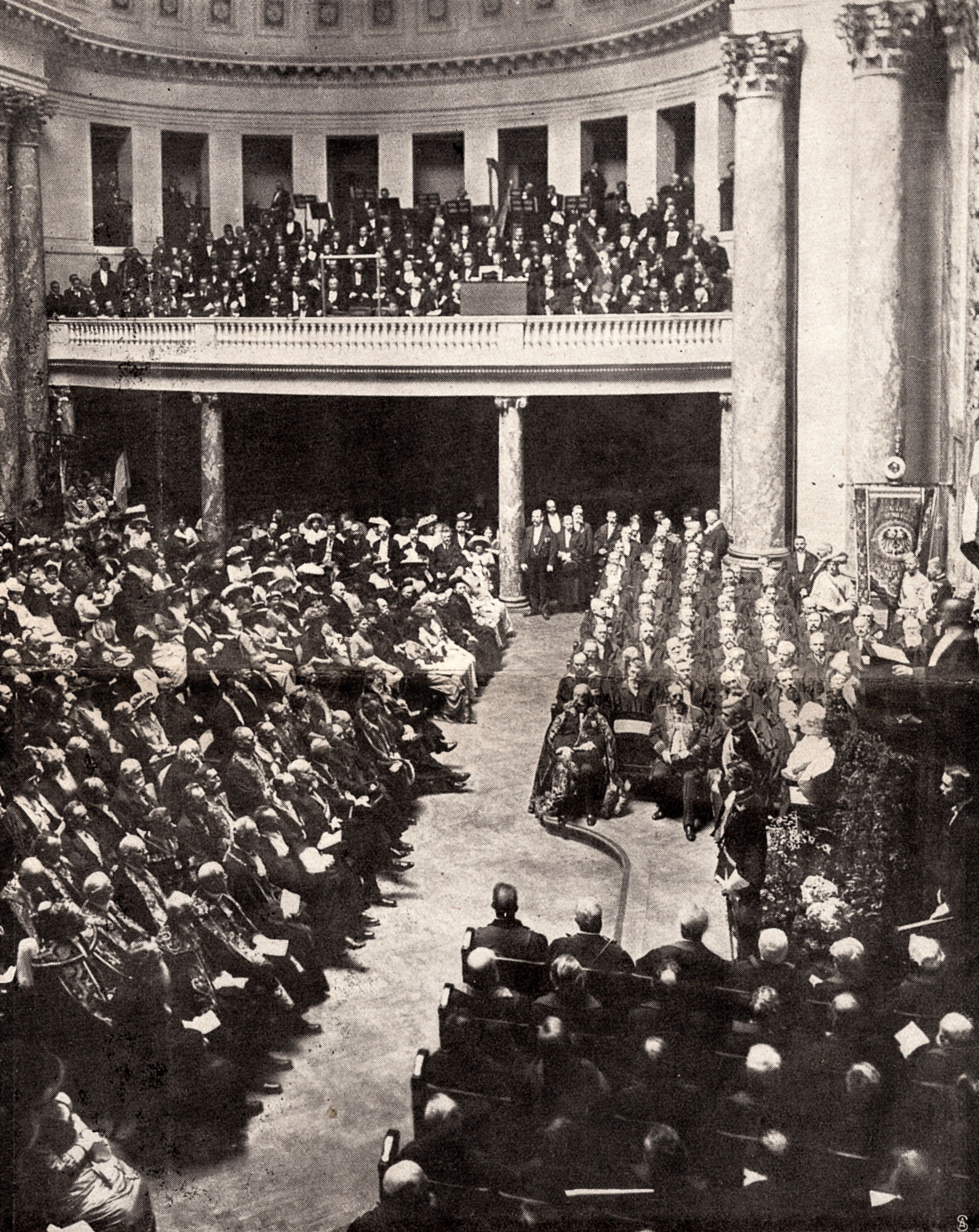
Otto Hintze speaks (Berlin, 1913)

Otto Hintze (August 27, 1861 – April 25, 1940) was a noted German historian. His focus was in the field of public administration. He taught at the University of Berlin. His role was Professor of Political, Constitutional, Administrative, and Economic History. Hintze's works explored how governments and societies grew. He studied their rules and economic systems.

Ernst Troeltsch and Max Weber greatly shaped Hintze's ideas. These thinkers influenced his views on institutions. Hintze stressed that Western groups developed in a logical way. He felt these groups had roots in the past. He saw a clear line from earlier times to modern systems. This was key to his view of history. Hintze argued against seeing change as random. He instead saw progress and reason within Western setups.

== Biography ==
Hintze was born in the small town of Pyritz (presently Pyrzyce in Poland), in the Province of Pomerania, and is the son of a civil servant. From 1878 to 1879, Hintze studied history, philosophy and philology in Greifswald. Here, he joined the fraternity Germania.

Hintze came to Berlin in 1880, and soon obtained a doctorate under Julius Weizsäcker with a dissertation on Medieval History, in 1884. He joined the project, ‘Acta Borussica’, an editing project of the Prussian Academy of Sciences under the directorship of Gustav Schmoller dealing with the Prussian administrative files of the 18th century. Seven volumes of sources on the economics and administrative organisation in Prussia, with detailed historical commentaries, were published by 1910. In 1895, his post-doctoral thesis to become a lecturer was accepted by Treitschke and Schmoller; in 1902, as Professor of the newly created Department of Political, Constitutional, Administrative and Economic History. In 1912, Hintze married his student Hedwig Guggenheimer. One of his key works, Die Hohenzollern und ihr Werk (The Hohenzollern and Their Legacy), is considered to be an important and solidly researched piece of scholarship, despite having been commissioned by the Prussian Hohenzollern dynasty for their ruling anniversary in 1915. Hintze was retired from the university in 1920, for health reasons.

Hintze ceased publishing after the Nazi Party came to power and, in 1933, he was the only member to speak against Albert Einstein's expulsion from the Prussian Academy of Sciences. In 1938, Hintze himself resigned from the Academy, which he had been a member of since 1914. His wife, Hedwig Hintze (born: Hedwig Guggenheimer), who was Germany's first woman to receive a doctorate in History and the University of Berlin's (Friedrich Wilhelm University) first woman History professor, because of her Jewish roots and leftist sympathies soon lost her position as lecturer at the Friedrich Wilhelm University, and eventually had to flee to the Netherlands in 1939. Otto Hintze only survived this separation for a few months. In 1942, his wife committed suicide rather than undergo deportation to a death camp by the Nazis.

== Legacy ==
Since the 1960s, there has been deeper research into Hintze's œuvre, as signified by Gerhard Oestreich’s detailed new work on him. The historians Jürgen Kocka and Felix Gilbert agree that, in their opinion, he could possibly be the most significant German historian of the German Empire and of the Weimar Republic.

Hintze is considered an influential figure in the state formation literature, particularly among advocates for "bellicist" state formation theories. Bellicist theories hold that war and preparation for war played a key causal role in the development of the modern European state.

=== Intellectual contribution ===
Hintze was a pioneer of the “bellicist” paradigm emphasizing that military success and victory are foundational to state-formation. He argued the state was originally a military organization, where army and state “were virtually identical”, and that all state organization grew out of war, violence and conquest.

He described the state as a product of constant war-tension, needing standing armies and efficient military and financial administration, and that even in peacetime internal tensions (rulers vs. the elites vs. bureaucracy) constrained the state. After World War I he criticized militarism, argued Germany should switch from expansion to stable power, and that the state is less about glory and more a coercive institution organized for survival, order and administration.

Hintze emphasised that political structures tend to solidify after war into enduring state institutions (administration, policing, military) coordinating through an executive, i.e., “the organizational residue of warfare”. He argued military and bureaucratic elites became the dominant ruling class after victory, and that victory increased state capacity, which in turn supported capitalist development through state-created markets, order and discipline.

== Works ==
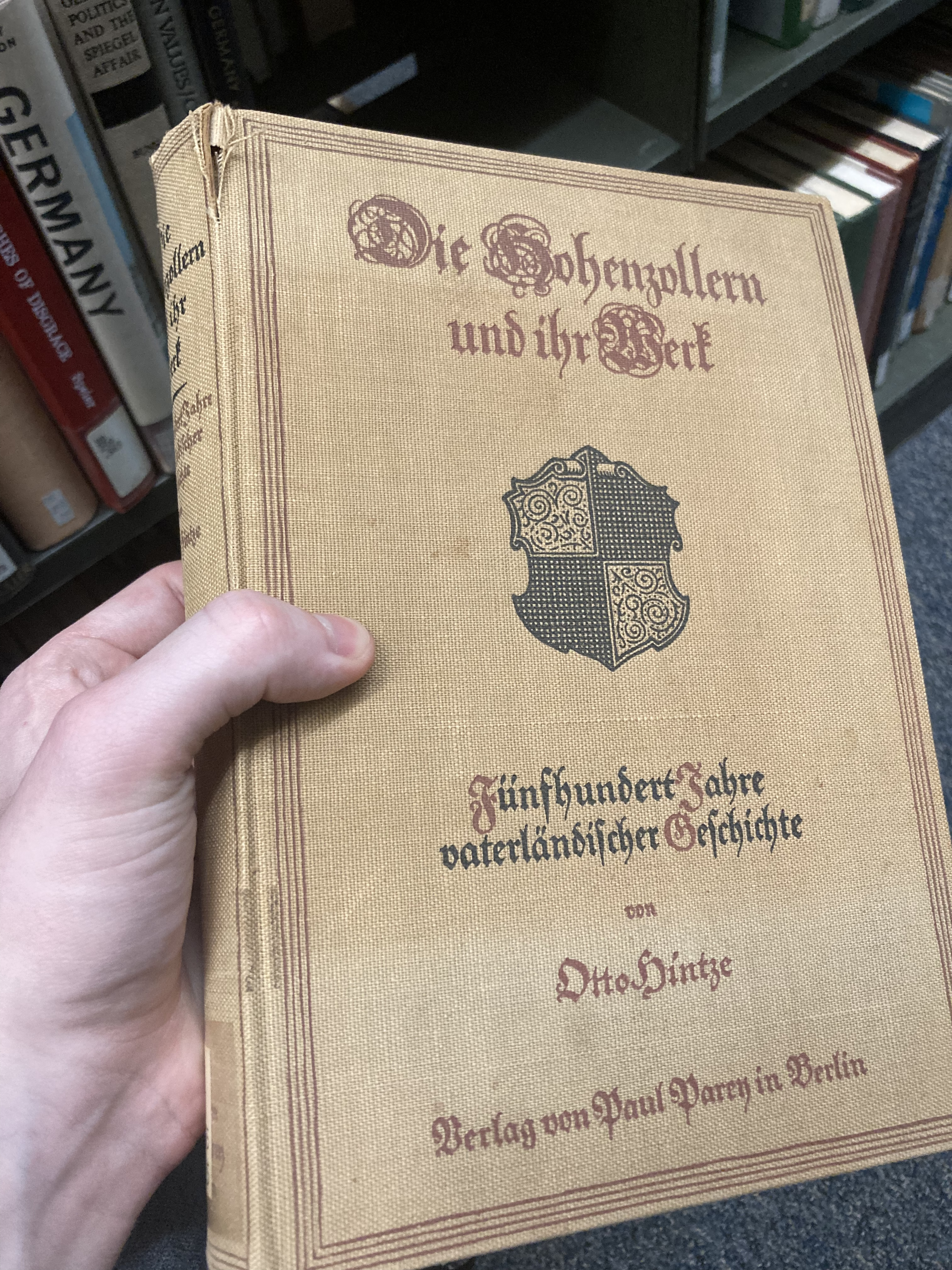
A person holding Otto Hintze's book Die Hohenzollern und ihr Werk

- Das Königtums Wilhelms von Holland, Leipzig 1885
- Die Preußische Seidenindustrie im 18. Jahrhundert und ihre Begründung durch Friedrich den Großen, 3 Volumes, Berlin 1892
- Einleitende Darstellung der Behördenorganisation und allgemeinen Verwaltung in Preußen beim Regierungsamt Friedrichs II., Berlin 1901
- Staatsverfassung und Heeresverfassung. Vortrag gehalten in der Gehe-Stiftung zu Dresden am 17. Februar 1906, Dresden 1906
- Historische und politische Aufsätze, 10 Volumes, Berlin 1908
- Monarchisches Prinzip und konstitutionelle Verfassung, in: Preußische Jahrbücher, Volume 144 (1911)
- Die englischen Weltherrschaftspläne und der gegenwärtige Krieg, Berlin 1914
- Die Hohenzollern und ihr Werk, Verlag: A. Steiger, Solingen 1915
- Deutschland und der Weltkrieg, 2 Volumes, Leipzig 1916
- Wesen und Verbreitung des Feudalismus, in: Sitzungsberichte der Preußischen Akademie der Wissenschaften (1929)

=== In English ===
- The Historical Essays of Otto Hintze, ed. Felix Gilbert. Oxford University Press, 1975, ISBN 0195018192.
