= Martin Schulze Wessel =

German historian

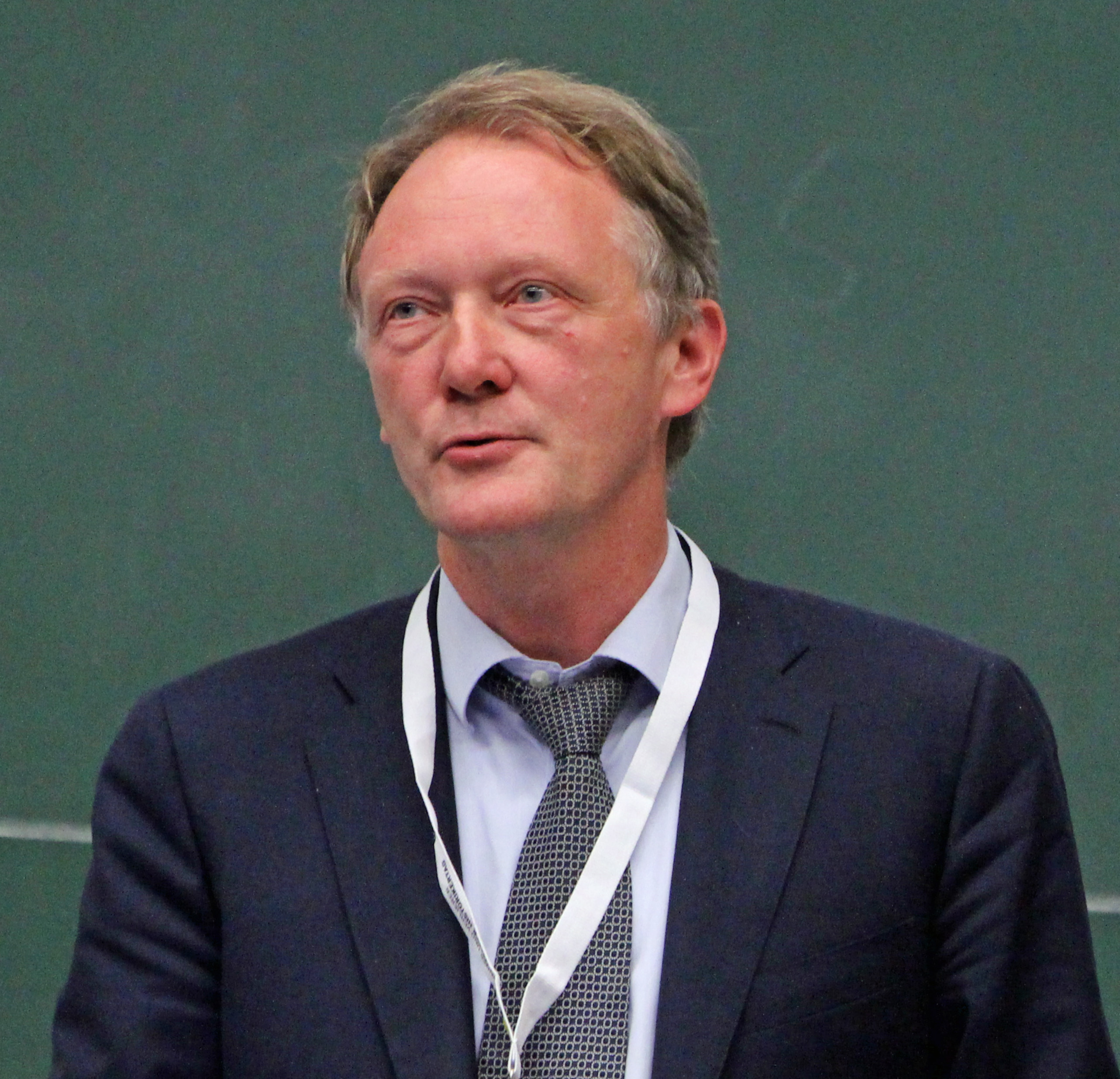
Martin Schulze Wessel at the German Historians' Congress 2014 in Göttingen

Martin Schulze Wessel (born 9 January 1962) is a German historian. He has been Professor of Eastern European History at LMU Munich since 2003.

== Life and work ==
Martin Schulze Wessel studied Modern and Eastern European History, and Slavic Studies at LMU Munich, Moscow State University, and the Free University of Berlin. From 1990 to 1995, he worked as a research assistant at the Friedrich Meinecke Institute of the Free University of Berlin. He received his doctorate in 1994 with a thesis on the reception of Prussia in Russia from the 18th to the 20th century. He completed his habilitation at the Martin Luther University Halle-Wittenberg with the thesis Revolution und religiöser Dissens. Der römisch-katholische und russisch-orthodoxe Klerus als Träger religiösen Wandels in den böhmischen Ländern und der Habsburgermonarchie bzw. in Russland 1848–1922 (Revolution and Religious Dissent. The Roman Catholic and Russian Orthodox Clergy as Promoters of Religious Change in the Bohemian Lands and the Habsburg Monarchy and in Russia 1848-1922). Since the 2003 summer semester, Schulze Wessel has held the Chair for History of Eastern and South-Eastern Europe at LMU Munich, succeeding Edgar Hösch. In the same year, he succeeded Ferdinand Seibt as director of the Collegium Carolinum.

The Bavarian Academy of Sciences and Humanities elected Schulze Wessel a full member of its Philosophical-Historical Class in 2008. Schulze Wessel was a visiting professor at Aarhus University (2014) and at the University of California, Berkeley (2018) as well as a Richard von Weizsäcker Fellow at St Antony's College, University of Oxford (2021/22).

Schulze Wessel is involved in a variety of international historical commissions. He is a member of the German-Czech and German-Slovak Historical Commissions, which he chaired from 2006 to 2012. Together with Yaroslav Hrytsak, Schulze Wessel founded the German-Ukrainian Historical Commission in 2014. He was co-spokesman of the commission until 2022. Under his chairmanship, the commission organised six international conferences and developed a portal on the history of German-Ukrainian relations in the 20th century.

As Chair for the History of Eastern and South-Eastern Europe, Schulze Wessel has created several research structures. From 2010 to 2019, he was spokesperson for the International Research Training Group “Religious Cultures in 19th and 20th Century Europe”, which is hosted by LMU Munich, Charles University in Prague, Adam Mickiewicz University in Poznań, and Masaryk University in Brno, and supported by the German Research Foundation (DFG) and the Czech national funding institution Grantová Agentura. Together with Ulf Brunnbauer, he is the spokesperson for the Graduate School for East and Southeast European Studies, which was established at LMU Munich and the University of Regensburg in December 2012 as part of the German federal and state governments’ Excellence Initiative and was funded by the DFG until 2019. Together with Andreas Wirsching and Kiran Klaus Patel, he founded the DFG-funded research group "Universalism and Particularism in Contemporary European History" in 2022, which regularly invites international researchers from the social sciences, cultural studies and history to LMU Munich. Together with Yaroslav Hrytsak and funded by the German Federal Ministry of Education and Research, he founded a core of excellence, an inter-university centre between LMU Munich and the Ukrainian Catholic University in Lviv for research into the history of Ukraine in the 20th century.

He is editor of the journals Bohemia and Jahrbücher für Geschichte Osteuropas, as well as co-editor of Geschichte und Gesellschaft.

From 2012 to 2016, he was Chairman of the Association of German Historians and thus responsible for organising the Historians’ Congresses in Göttingen (2014) and Hamburg (2016). From 2017 to 2019, he was Chairman of the Board of Trustees of the Historisches Kolleg in Munich. Since 2023, he has been Chairman of the Academic Advisory Board "Challenges and Opportunities of Academic Cooperation with Post-Soviet States" of the German Academic Exchange Service (DAAD), which formulates recommendations for the reorganisation of German academic relations with Eastern Europe and Central Asia.

His research and teaching focuses on the history of Russia and the Soviet Union, the history of Ukraine, Poland, the Czech Republic, and Slovakia. Special research interests include the religious history of Eastern Central and Eastern Europe, the history of empires, historical thought, and the contemporary history of Central and Eastern Europe since the 1960s.

== Positions ==
In 2010, Schulze Wessel was the initiator of the Konzeptuelle Überlegungen (Conceptual Considerations) for an exhibition on forced migration and displacement, which represented a counter-draft to the key points paper presented by Manfred Kittel of the “Flight, Expulsion, Reconciliation” Foundation. The "Conceptual Considerations" were supported by the German-Polish Textbook Commission and the German-Czech and German-Slovak Historical Commission, received wide media coverage, and became the subject of a H-Soz-Kult discussion forum.

As Chairman of the Historians’ Association in Germany, Schulze Wessel argued in 2015 in favour of a fundamental reform of the job structure at German universities and supported the Young Academy's reform proposal to reduce the average entry age of academics in permanent positions by ten years.

In 2017, Schulze Wessel organised an appeal to European governments and the European Commission to preserve the Central European University in Budapest, which was published by the Frankfurter Allgemeine Zeitung and signed by 20 renowned scientists, including the heads of German scientific organisations (DFG, Leibniz Association, etc.).

Schulze Wessel has made several statements about the Holodomor as genocide in the run-up to the corresponding Bundestag decision.

In 2023, together with Claudia Major and Norbert Röttgen, he initiated an appeal for resolute support for Ukraine, which was signed by 70 prominent figures from science and politics.

== Selected publications ==
Monographs

- Der Fluch des Imperiums. Die Ukraine, Polen und der Irrweg in der russischen Geschichte. Beck, Munich, 2023, ISBN 978-3-406-80049-8.
- Der Prager Frühling. Aufbruch in eine neue Welt. Reclam, Ditzingen 2018, ISBN 978-3-15-011159-8.
- Revolution und religiöser Dissens. Der römisch-katholische und russisch-orthodoxe Klerus als Träger religiösen Wandels in den böhmischen Ländern und in Russland 1848–1922 (= Veröffentlichungen des Collegium Carolinum. Bd. 123). Oldenbourg, Munich 2011, ISBN 3-486-70662-4.
- Russlands Blick auf Preußen. Die polnische Frage in der Diplomatie und der politischen Öffentlichkeit des Zarenreiches und des Sowjetstaates 1697–1947. Klett-Cotta, Stuttgart 1995, ISBN 3-608-91723-3.

Editorships

- with Franziska Davies and Michael Brenner: Jews and Muslims in the Russian Empire and the Soviet Union (= Religiöse Kulturen im Europa der Neuzeit. Bd. 6). Vandenhoeck & Ruprecht, Göttingen 2015, ISBN 978-3-525-31028-1
- with Irene Götz and Ekaterina Makhotina: Vilnius. Geschichte und Gedächtnis einer Stadt zwischen den Kulturen. Campus-Verlag, Frankfurt 2012, ISBN 978-3-593-39308-7.
- Nationalisierung der Religion und Sakralisierung der Nation im östlichen Europa, Stuttgart 2006, ISBN 3-515-08665-X.
- Loyalitäten in der Tschechoslowakischen Republik: 1918–1938 (= Veröffentlichungen des Collegium Carolinum. Bd. 101). Oldenbourg, Munich 2004, ISBN 3-486-57587-2.
- with Jörg Requate: Europäische Öffentlichkeit. Transnationale Kommunikation seit dem 18. Jahrhundert. Campus-Verlag, Frankfurt 2002, ISBN 3-593-37043-3.
