= Stieve =

Stieve is a surname. Notable people with the surname include:

- Felix Stieve (1845–1898), German historian
- Hermann Stieve (1886–1952), German physician, anatomist, and histologist
- Terry Stieve (born 1954), American football player

== See also ==
- Steve
