= Thomas Wünsch =

German historian

Thomas Wünsch (born 21 August 1962) is a German historian.

== Life ==
Born in Landshut, Wünsch studied history, philosophy and Slavic at the University of Regensburg from 1982 to 1988. After studying history, romance, philosophy and Slavic studies under Kurt Reindel and Horst Fuhrmann, he received his doctorate in 1991 with the thesis Spiritalis intellegentia. On the allegorical interpretation of the Bible by Petrus Damiani. From 1991 to 1994, he worked as a historian at the Foundation House of Upper Silesia. He then worked as a research assistant to Alexander Patschovsky at the University of Konstanz from 1994 to 1998. There, he completed his habilitation in 1997 with a thesis on Conciliarism and Poland. From 1998 to 2003, Wünsch was a university lecturer in general and East Central European history of the Middle Ages. Since 2003, Wünsch has taught Modern and Contemporary History of Eastern Europe and its Cultures at the University of Passau. He is a member of the Historical Commission for Silesia and since 2004 co-editor of the Zeitschrift für Ostmitteleuropa-Forschung. From 1993 to 1996, he edited the Upper Silesian Yearbook.

His research interests include parliamentary forms in church and state, religious sites of memory, the nobility in Silesia, humanism and the Renaissance in Eastern Europe, and Ruthenia.

== Publications ==
Monographs

- Deutsche und Slawen im Mittelalter: Beziehungen zu Tschechen, Polen, Südslawen und Russen. Oldenbourg, Munich 2008, ISBN 978-3-486-58707-4.
- Konziliarismus und Polen: Personen, Politik und Programme aus Polen zur Verfassungsfrage der Kirche in der Zeit der mittelalterlichen Reformkonzilien. Schöningh, Paderborn among others 1998, ISBN 3-506-74727-4 (in the same time Habilitations-Schrift for the Konstanz University 1997/98).
- Spiritalis intellegentia. Zur allegorischen Bibelinterpretation des Petrus Damiani (Theorie und Forschung. Vol. 190). Roderer, Regensburg 1991, ISBN 3-89073-578-9 (in the same time Dissertation at the Regensburg University, 1991).

Editorships

- Religion und Magie in Ostmitteleuropa: Spielräume theologischer Normierungsprozesse in Spätmittelalter und Früher Neuzeit (Religions- und Kulturgeschichte in Ostmittel- und Südosteuropa. Bd. 8). Lit-Verlag, Berlin 2006, ISBN 3-8258-9273-5.
- Stadtgeschichte Oberschlesiens: Studien zur städtischen Entwicklung und Kultur einer ostmitteleuropäischen Region vom Mittelalter bis zum Vorabend der Industrialisierung (Tagungsreihe der Stiftung Haus Oberschlesien. Vol. 5). Mann, Berlin 1995, ISBN 3-7861-1917-1.
- Reformation und Gegenreformation in Oberschlesien. Die Auswirkungen auf Politik, Kunst und Kultur im ostmitteleuropäischen Kontext (Tagungsreihe der Stiftung Haus Oberschlesien. Vol. 3). Gebr. Mann, Berlin 1994, ISBN 3-7861-1829-9.
