= Ostforschung =

20th century German studies of Eastern regions

Ostforschung (German: [ˈɔstˌfɔʁʃʊŋ]; "research on the east") is a German term, dating from the 18th century, for the study of the areas to the east of the core German-speaking region. It focused especially on the relationship between German migrants and the various peoples within eastern europe. At its core, Ostforschung postulated that Germans were responsible for bringing civilization to regions like the Baltic, and that Germans was superior to other groups like Poles. Concepts of German superiority, and Prussian stereotypes about various eastern european peoples, were core beliefs to this field of research.

== History ==
German scholars took a particular interest in Ostforschung after the signing of the Treaty of Versailles. Proponents of the field, with instutional support, looked to undermine the legitimacy of the new eastern nation states created Versailles, and reinforce German claims to dominance over the region. The idea underlying Ostforschung (as opposed to more standard academic fields studying eastern european) was that German colonists were the predominant source of civilization to places like the Baltic, and therefore they held a legitimate dominance over the regions. At the same time, the German settlers (according to Ostforschung scholars) also maintained a special connection with the rest of German Reich. Such historical conceptions contributed to Nazis plans for eastern europe, legitimizing wars of conquest as a "return" of the east's historical subordination to the Germans.

Major scholars worked within the Nazi government to establish Ostforschung as the main historical method for studying the areas east of the Elbe river, and thereby provide intellectual support for the Nazi's genocidal policies. A prominent example is Albert Brackmann, general director of the Prussian State archives. Brackmann and several other Nazi academics co-ordinated research on Eastern Europe, especially the Second Polish Republic, with the goals of the Third Reich. Their research in this field, as well as works done by groups like the Ahnenerbe, was instrumental for the planning of ethnic cleansing and genocide against non-German populations in Generalplan Ost.

==== Post-war ====
Traditional Ostforschung has fallen into disrepute with modern German historians, as it often reflected Western European prejudices of Eastern Europeans. The term Ostforschung itself remained in use in the names of some journals and institutes throughout the Cold War, but was replaced by more specific terms by the 1990s (e.g., the journal Zeitschrift für Ostforschung, established in 1952, was renamed Zeitschrift für Ostmitteleuropa-Forschung in 1994). Since the 1990s, Ostforschung itself has become a subject of historical research.

== See also ==
- Drang nach Osten
- Generalplan Ost
- Volksdeutsche

== Sources ==
- Burleigh, Michael. Germany Turns Eastwards: A Study of Ostforschung in the Third Reich.
- Auf den Spuren der Ostforschung; Eine Sammlung von Beiträgen der Arbeitsgemeinschaft zur Bekämpfung der westdeutschen "Ostforschung" beim Institut für Geschichte der europäischen Volksdemokratien. Leipzig. 1962.
- Józef Szłapczyński, Tadeusz Walichnowski, „Nauka w służbie ekspansji i rewizjonizmu (Ostforschung)”, Interpress, Warszawa 1969.
- Drożdżyński Aleksander, Zaborowski Jan, „Oberländer: Przez „Ostforschung”, wywiad i NSDAP do rządu NRF”, Warszawa 1960.
- „Organizacje przesiedleńców oraz tzw. Ostforschung – narzędzia rewizjonizmu”, „Ost-Mittel Europa” w programie odwetowym „Ostforschung” [w:] „Bezpieczeństwo Europy a groźba militaryzmu zachodnioniemieckiego; materiały międzynarodowej konferencji naukowej Praga 23-27 maja 1961”, Polski Instytut Spraw Międzynarodowych, Warszawa 1961.
- Wróblewski Seweryn Tadeusz, „Ewolucja „Ostforschung” w Republice Federalnej Niemiec”, 1969-1982 (Studium niemcoznawcze Instytutu Zachodniego), Instytut Zachodni, 1986 ISBN 83-85003-04-5.
- „Deutsche Ostforschung und polnische „, Wydawnictwo: Poznańskie Towarzystwo Przyjaciół Nauk Poznań 2002, ISBN 83-7063-313-7.
- Wacław Długoborski, „Śląsk w oczach zachodnioniemieckiej Ostforschung”, Milan Myška, „Ostforschung w NRF a dzieje Czechosłowacji”, Śląski Instytut Naukowy, Katowice 1962.
- German Scholars and Ethnic Cleansing, 1919-1945 by Michael Fahlbusch and Ingo Haar, Berghahn Books, 2005
