= Drang nach Osten =

Motto of the 19th-century German nationalist movement

Drang nach Osten (German: [ˈdʁaŋ naːx ˈʔɔstn̩]; lit. 'Drive to the East') was the name for two concepts in Pan-German policy in the 19th- and 20th centuries:

- Expansion of Germanic territory into Slavic territories of Central and Eastern Europe (Ostsiedlung), based on historical German settlement. The slogan was used with the idea of "superiority of German culture". Polish scholarship used the term for the 19th-century programs for the Germanization of Poland. The concept became a core element of Nazi ideology and Adolf Hitler deemed it to be an essential element of his reorganisation plans for Europe.
- Expansion of Germanic influence and control towards the Middle East and thereby economic, military and political superiority (as a superpower). This was manifested in the "Eastern Question", that is, the competition for power in the light of weakening of the Ottoman Empire. Germany and Austria-Hungary sought control of the Balkans and undermined Serbia, "holding the gate to the East" and being a champion of Pan-Slavism in the region (South Slavic unification).

== Terminology ==
The German term Drang nach Osten is translated as Drive to the East; Push Eastward, Desire to Push East, etc. The first known use of Drang nach Osten was by the Polish journalist Julian Klaczko in 1849, yet it is debatable whether he invented the term as he used it in form of a citation. Because the term is used almost exclusively in its German form in English, Polish, Russian, Czech and other languages, it has been concluded that the term is of German origin, and it is treated as a loanword from German.

== Ostsiedlung and Germanization ==
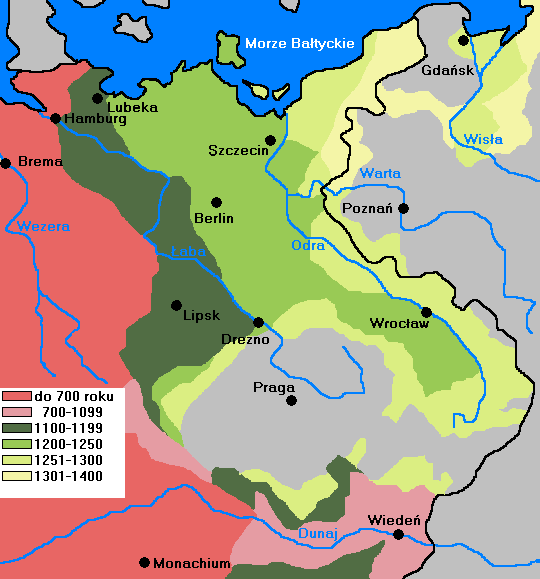
Phases of German eastward expansion, 700–1400.

In the 19th and the early 20th century Drang nach Osten was associated with the medieval German Ostsiedlung, the High Medieval migration period of ethnic Germans to Eastern Europe, inhabited by Slavs, Balts, and Finno-Ugrics. This movement caused legal, cultural, linguistic, religious and economic changes, that had a profound influence on the history of Eastern Europe between the Baltic Sea and the Carpathians.

Massive population increase during the High Middle Ages left increasing numbers of commoners like peasants, craftsmen and artisans displaced, who were joined by nobility not entitled to land inheritance, stimulating the movement of settlers from territories of the Holy Roman Empire, such as the Rhineland, Flanders and Saxony into the sparsely populated East. These movements were supported by the Slavic kings and dukes and the Church.

The future state of Prussia, named for the conquered Old Prussians, had its roots largely in these movements. As the Middle Ages came to a close, the Teutonic Knights, who had been invited to northern Poland by Konrad of Masovia, had assimilated and forcibly converted much of the southern Baltic coastlands. After the Partitions of Poland by the Kingdom of Prussia, Austria, and the Russian Empire in the late 18th century, Prussia gained much of western Poland. The Prussians, and later the Germans, engaged in a policy of Germanization in Polish territories. Russia and Sweden eventually conquered the lands taken by the Teutonic Knights in Estonia and Livonia.

Drang nach Osten was the name for a 19th-century German nationalist intent to expand Germany and Austria-Hungary into Slavic territories of Central and Eastern Europe. It became the centerpiece of the program of the Pan-German League: "The old Drang nach Osten must be revived" (Der alte Drang nach dem Osten soll wiederbelebt werden, 1891).

Polish scholarship used the term for the programs for the Germanization of Poland.

== Eastern Question and the Balkans ==
The German Empire and Austria-Hungary attempted to expand their power eastward; Germany by gaining influence in the declining Ottoman Empire (the Eastern Question) and Austria-Hungary through the acquisition of territory in the Balkans (such as Bosnia and Herzegovina) and diminishing Serbia.

In the second half of the 19th century, Germany sought to become a world leader dictating international politics. The solid resistance by the French and British in the last quarter made the Pan-Germans opt for the "Berlin–Baghdad" plan, the idea of an German-allied network stretching to the Persian Gulf. The German construction of Ottoman railways (the Berlin–Baghdad railway) would complete its control of economy and military in that part of Asia Minor, resulting in German domination in both economy and naval power. The chain of German-allied states stretched Germany–Austria-Hungary–Bulgaria–Turkey. This line was blocked by the little country of Serbia in the Central Balkans, "holding the gate to the East", which was a nuisance to Germany.

After 1903, Serbia tried to rid itself of dependency on Austria in the economical and political sphere; Austria-Hungary led the Drang nach Osten in the Balkans, and its main obstacle was Serbia, due to its geographic location and national-liberation movements which also gathered other South Slav peoples. Austria-Hungary unilaterally annexed Bosnia and Herzegovina in 1908, which led to a political crisis (and Serbian outrage), and fiercely opposed the rise of Serbia and an unified South Slavic movement (which threatened Austria-Hungary as it had Slavic minorities). With Serbian victory in the First Balkan War, Germany began preparing for military action against Serbia as it feared it would block the Drang nach Osten (control of the East). By the time of World War I, Serbia was the only obstacle to the (southward) Drang nach Osten of Germanic culture.

== World War I ==
At the March 1917 Berlin conference, German leaders proposed the removal (expulsion) of significant Slavic and Baltic populations as a prerequisite for colonizing the Baltic regions already under the control of the Reich's armies.

== Nazi Germany ==
Adolf Hitler, dictator of Nazi Germany from 1933–1945, advocated for a Drang nach Osten to acquire territory for German colonists at the expense of central and eastern European nations (Lebensraum). The term, by then, had gained enough currency to appear in foreign newspapers without explanation. The concept became a core element of Nazi ideology. In Mein Kampf (1925–1926), Adolf Hitler declares the idea to be an essential element of his reorganisation plans for Europe. He states: "It is eastwards, only and always eastwards, that the veins of our race must expand. It is the direction which nature herself has decreed for the expansion of the German peoples." Nazi propaganda depicted Eastern Europe as historically Germanic territories, promoting the myth that these regions were stolen from Aryan races by Hunnic and Avar tribes. Drang nach Osten combined historical German settlement in Central and Eastern Europe, medieval (12th to 13th century) military expeditions such as those of the Teutonic Knights (the Northern Crusades), and Germanisation policies and warfare of modern German states into Nazism's concept of Lebensraum. Hitler viewed Slavs as primitive subhumans and for this reason detested the German empire's alliance with Austria-Hungary during World War I. In his works such as Mein Kampf and Zweites Buch, Hitler viewed the Slavs as lacking the capability to form a state. Academics in the field of Ostforschung worked with the Nazi regime to create a historical basis for such claims, arguing that all civilizational developments in Eastern Europe came from German settlers to the region.

Anti-Slavism was a core doctrine of Nazi ideology, which considered Slavs to be racially inferior Untermensch. Through the Generalplan Ost ("General Plan for the East"), Nazi Germany sought the total domination by Germanic peoples of Eastern Europe by conducting a genocide of Slavic inhabitants and forcibly deporting rest of the population beyond the Urals. After Nazi Germany's initiation of Operation Barbarossa, the propaganda of Axis powers described the military campaign as a "European crusade against Bolshevism" to foreign powers. Meanwhile, Nazi Germany's domestic propaganda depicted the war as a racial struggle of Aryans against "Jewish and Slavic Untermenschen" to annihilate "Judeo-Bolshevism". The Reich Security Main Office, under Heinrich Himmler, played an active role in distributing racist propaganda pamphlets on these topics across German-occupied territories.

In 1938, Adolf Hitler was given a report on 175 German eastern campaigns conducted during 789–1157, a third of which were successful, quarter were semi-successful, and the rest were a failure. Twenty of these eastern campaigns ended in military disaster for Germany. Nazi Germany employed the slogan in calling the Czechs a "Slav bulwark against the Drang nach Osten" in the 1938 occupation of the Sudetenland. Nazi Germany's eastern campaigns during World War II were initially successful with the conquests of Poland, the Baltic countries, Belarus, Ukraine and much of European Russia by the Wehrmacht; Generalplan Ost was implemented by Nazi forces to eliminate the native Slavic peoples from these lands and replace them with Germans. The Wehrbauer, or soldier-peasants, would settle in a fortified line to prevent civilization arising beyond and threatening Germany.

This was greatly hindered by the lack of German people who desired to settle in the east, let alone act as Teutonic Knights there. Settlements established during the war did not receive colonists from the Altreich, but in the main part East European Germans resettled from Soviet "spheres of interest" according to the Molotov–Ribbentrop Pact, and such Poles as deemed Germanizable by Nazis. However, the Soviet Union began to reverse the German conquests by 1943. Nazi Germany was defeated by the Allies in 1945 and the expulsion of Germans after World War II followed.

== Legacy ==
=== Russia and Serbia ===
Russia and Serbia were both part of the Allies in both World wars.

=== Drang nach Westen ===
In the years after World War I the idea of a Drang nach Westen ('drive to the west'), an alleged Polish drive westward—an analogy of Drang nach Osten—circulated among German authors in reaction to the loss of eastern territories and the Polish Corridor. German nationalists called for a new Drang nach Osten to oppose what they conceived as a Polish Drang nach Westen ('thrust toward the West'). The Polish paper Wprost used both Drang nach Osten and Drang nach Westen in August 2002 to title stories about the German company RWE taking over the Polish STOEN and Polish migration into eastern Germany, respectively.

Drang nach Westen is also the ironic title of a chapter in Eric Joseph Goldberg's book Struggle for Empire, used to point out the "missing" eastward ambitions of Louis the German who instead expanded his kingdom to the West.

== See also ==
- Lebensraum
- Ostsiedlung
- Ostforschung
- New Order (Nazism)
- Manifest destiny
- Anti-Slavic sentiment
