= Deutscher Historikertag =

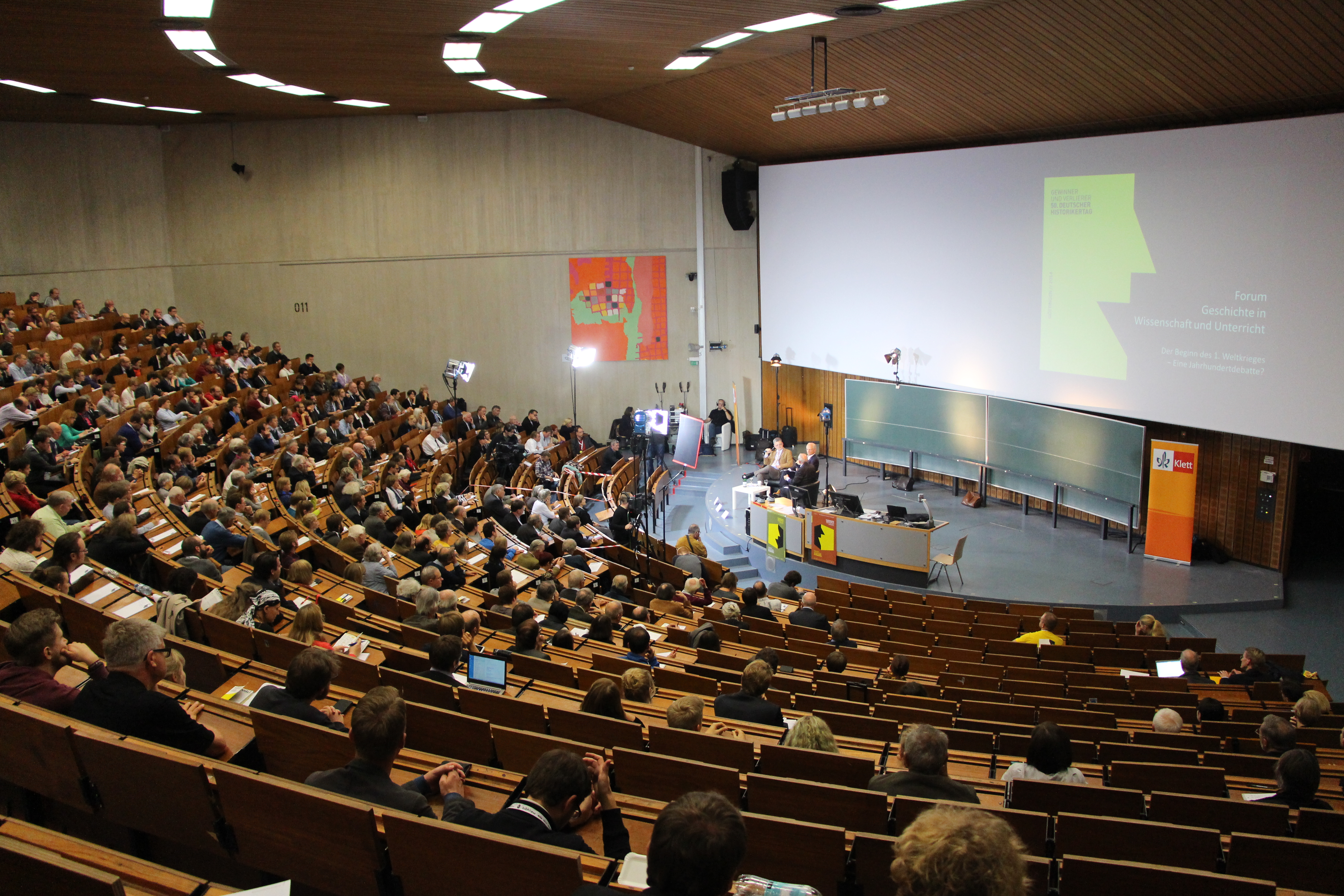
50th German Historians' Convention in 2014 in Göttingen, here with a discussion between Christopher Clark and Gerd Krumeich about the origins of the First World War

The Deutscher Historikertag (or, usually, just Historikertag; German Historians Conference) is one of the largest conventions of the humanities in Europe. It is organised by the German Association of Historians and the Association for History Teachers. The convention took place for the first time in 1893. The event is organised every second year in a German university town, and gathers c. 3000 historians mostly from the German-speaking countries. Speaker at the opening is usually a high-ranking German politician such as the President or the Chancellor of Germany.
