= Collegium Carolinum (1956) =

Research institute in Germany

Collegium Carolinum is a research institute in Germany, which is focused primarily on the history and culture of the Czech Republic and Slovakia. The main period studied by the institute is the 19th and 20th century.

Collegium Carolinum was established by the Bavarian State Government in 1956 as a result of the expulsion of Germans from Czechoslovakia at the end of World War II, when the remains of the German-speaking Charles-Ferdinand University were expelled from Czechoslovakia. Between 1980–2003 it was managed by Ferdinand Seibt. From 2003 it is managed by Martin Schulze Wessel.
