= Karsten Brüggemann =

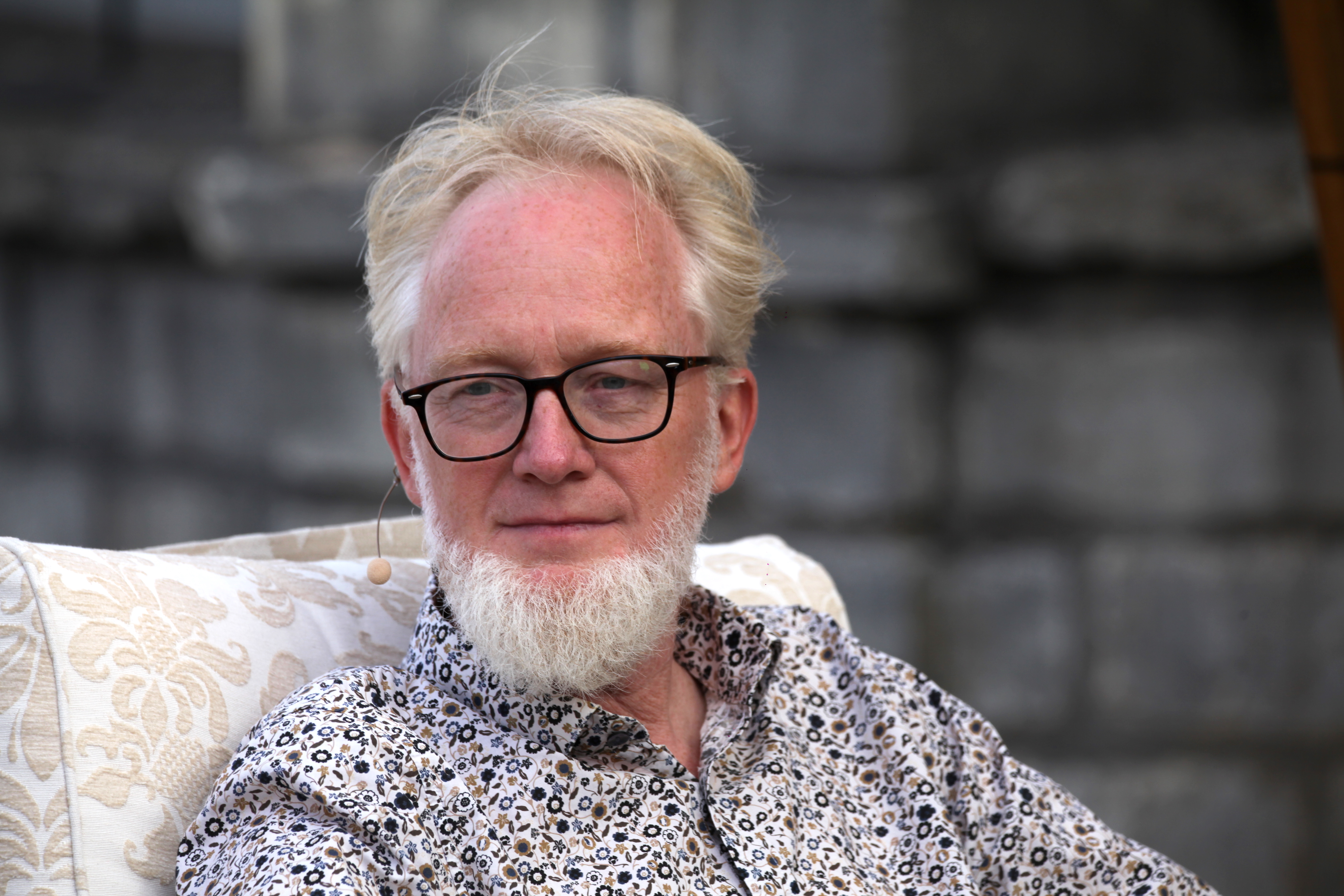
- Brüggemann at the Arvamusfestival, 2022
- Born: 1965 (age 60–61)
- Board member of: Zeitschrift für Ostmitteleuropa-Forschung

Academic background
- Education: University of Hamburg
- Thesis: Die Gründung der Republik Estland und das Ende des "Einen und Unteilbaren Russland" (1999)

Academic work
- Discipline: History
- Sub-discipline: Cultural and social history
- Main interests: Stalinism, sport and tourism, memory studies
- Website: Karsten Brüggemann publications on Academia.edu

Karsten Brüggemann (born 1965) is a German historian. Since 2024 he has been professor at Tallinn University, School of Humanities. His research interests include history, culture and society.

Topics of his publications include Baltic and Russian/Soviet common history, nationalism(s) in empires, Stalinist culture, the history of sport and tourism, and memory conflicts between the Baltic states and the Russia.

== Education ==
- 2012–2013: University of Giessen, Giessen Center for Eastern European Studies, habilitation with the study a study on the perception of the Baltic provinces in Russian imperial culture published in 2018 under the title Licht und Luft des Imperiums. Legimitations- und Repräsentationsstrategien russischer Herrschaft in den Ostseeprovinzen im 19. und frühen 20. Jahrhundert
- 1994–1999: University of Hamburg, Faculty of Philosophy, History Department, PhD (summa cum laude) with Die Gründung der Republik Estland und das Ende des "Einen und Unteilbaren Russland". Die Petrograder Front des Russischen Bürgerkriegs 1918-1920 (published as monograph in 2002)
- 1986–1993: University of Hamburg, Faculty of Philosophy, MA in History and Slavic literature

== Awards ==
- 2022: Estonian State Award in Humanities
- 2012: Special prize for best monograph "Tallinn Eine kleine Geschichte" (co-authored with Ralph Tuchtenhagen) by Tallinn University
