= Hedwig Hintze =

- Born: 6 February 1884
- Died: 19 July 1942 (aged 58)

Academic work
- Discipline: history
- Main interests: French Revolution

Hedwig Hintze (née Guggenheimer; 6 February 1884 – 19 July 1942) was a German modernist historian. Her research focused particularly on the history of the French Revolution.

== Biography ==
Born into a family of assimilated Jewish bankers, she earned her diploma as a professor of French at the age of 17 from the state of Bavarian.In 1910, she moved to Berlin, where she began studying history at the university. That same year, she was admitted to Otto Hintze’s seminar on the “comparative history of institutions.” She married him in 1913,[1] despite a 23-year age difference between them.

When the First World War broke out, she volunteered for the Red Cross until 1915, the year her husband, suffering from a severe eye disease, had to leave his university post. For years he depended on her. In 1928 she defended her thesis: Staatseinheit und Föderalismus im alten Frankreich und in der Revolution (« Unité de l'État et fédéralisme sous l'Ancien Régime et la Révolution »). She taught at the university of Berlin until 1933.

== Persecution under the Nazis ==
When the Nazis come to power, Hintze was persecuted due to her Jewish heritage. She was forced out of the university by anti-Jewish racial laws, which made it illegal for Jews to work there. She was fired from the Historische Zeitschrift, Germany’s most important historical journal, and in response, her husband resigned from his position as the journal’s co-editor.

She received a scholarhip from the Rockefeller Foundation to work near Paris as a researcher at the Centre de documentation international contemporaine in Vincennes. In 1936 she returned to Berlin to join her husband. In August 1939 she fled to the Netherlands. She attempted to flee to the United States but was unsuccessful.

Her husband Otto Hintze died on 25 April 1940, just before the invasion of the Netherlands by Nazi Germany. Destitute, unable to work because of anti-semitic laws, in the spring of 1942, she attempted once again to flee, but she was unable to get to Switzerland.

She died in 1942 in a clinic in Utrecht, but it is not clear whether she committed suicide or her heart gave out.

== Legacy ==
After her death, her work was forgotten until 1989, when her thesis Staatseinheit und Föderalismus im alten Frankreich und in der Revolution was republished in Germany for the bicentenial of the French Revolution.

An "Institut Hadwig-Hintze" was created in Bremen in 1996.

The Department of History and Cultural Studies at the Freie Universität Berlin awards a Hedwig Hintze Prize for the Advancement of Women, for an exceptional thesis in history.

== Works ==
- "Der moderne französische Regionalismus und seine Wurzeln". Preussische Jahrbücher (in German). 181. 1921.
- "Ökonomische Probleme des französischen Revolution". Zeitschrift für Politik (in German). 23. 1923.
- "Hugo Preuss. Eine historisch-politisch Charakteristik". Die Justiz Monatsschrift für Erneuerung des deutschen Rechtswesens, zugleich Organ des Republikanischen Richterbundes (in German). 2. 1927.
- "Des deutsche Einheitsstaat und die Geschichte". Die Justiz Monatsschrift für Erneuerung des deutschen Rechtswesens, zugleich Organ des Republikanischen Richterbundes (in German). 3. 1927.
- Staatseinheit und Föderalismus im alten Frankreich und in der Revolution (in German). Berlin: DVA. 1928.
  réédité avec une préface de Rolf Reichardt, Francfort-sur-le-Main, Suhrkamp Verlag, 1989.
- "Das heutige Frankreich". Zeitschrift für die gesamte Staatswissenschaft (in German). 92. 1932.
- "Goethe und die französische Revolution". Die Justiz Monatsschrift für Erneuerung des deutschen Rechtswesens, zugleich Organ des Republikanischen Richterbundes (in German). 7. 1932.
  traduit en français par Henri Sée sous le titre « Goethe et la Révolution française » dans les Annales historiques de la Révolution française, vol. 9, 1932
- "Nation und Humanität. Von einer deutschen Frau". Politische Rundschau. Revue politique. Rivista politica (in German). 12. 1933.
  traduit en français par Francis Leray sous le titre « Nation et humanité dans la pensée des temps modernes » dans Revue d’histoire moderne, vol. 8, 1933.
- "Jean Jaurès und die materialistische Geschichtestheorie". Archiv für Sozialwissenschaft und Sozialpolitik (in German). 68. 1933.
- "Jean Jaurès und Karl Marx". Tijdschrift voor Geschiedenis (in German). 51. 1936. (écrit sous pseudonyme)
- "Nachruf auf Albert Mathiez (1874-1932)". Tijdschrift voor Geschiedenis (in German). 55. 1940.
