= Treitschke =

Treitschke (ennobled: von Treitschke) is a German surname, most famously borne by a family from Saxony. Notable people with the surname include:

- Curt Erwin Franz Gustav Treitschke^{de:} (1872–1946), military officer and cartographer
- Eduard Heinrich von Treitschke^{de:} (1796–1867), military officer
- Georg Carl Treitschke^{de:} (1783–1855), jurist and author
- Georg Friedrich Treitschke (1776–1842), artist and scientist
- Heinrich Gotthard von Treitschke (1834–1896), German historian and nationalist
- Heinrich Leo von Treitschke^{de:} (1840–1927), military officer
