= Felix Stieve =

German historian (1845–1898)

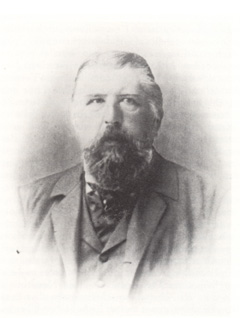
Felix Stieve

Felix Stieve (9 March 1845, in Münster – 10 June 1898, in Munich) was a German historian. He was the father of anatomist Hermann Stieve (1886–1952).

He studied history at the University of Breslau, the Friedrich Wilhelm University of Berlin, the University of Innsbruck, and the Ludwig-Maximilians-Universität München, obtaining his habilitation at the latter institution in 1874. In 1878, he became a member of the Bavarian Academy of Sciences, and from 1886, taught classes as a professor at the Technische Hochschule München.

== Selected works ==
- Der Kampf um Donauwörth im Zusammenhang der Reichsgeschichte (1875) – The Battle of Donauwörth in the context of the history of the Reich.
- Das kirchliche Polizeiregiment in Baiern unter Maximilian I, 1595-1651 (1876) – The ecclesiastical police regiment in Bavaria under Maximilian I.
- Der Kalenderstreit des sechzehnten Jahrhunderts in Deutschland (1880) – Calendar of the sixteenth century in Germany.
- Der oberösterreichische Bauernaufstand des Jahres 1626 (1891) – The Upper Austrian peasant uprising of 1626.
- Abhandlungen, Vorträge und Reden (1900) – Essays, lectures and speeches.

He was the author of numerous biographies in the Allgemeine Deutsche Biographie, and published articles on Wilhelm von Giesebrecht and Ignaz von Döllinger in the Deutsche Zeitschrift für Geschichtswissenschaft. He also made significant contributions to the journal Zeitschrift des Historischen Vereins für Schwaben und Neuburg ("Journal of the Historical Association for Swabia and Neuburg").
