= Zeitschrift für Ostmitteleuropa-Forschung =

- Discipline: History and culture of Eastern Europe
- Language: German, English
- Edited by: Hans-Jürgen Bömelburg, Karsten Brüggemann, John Connelly, Peter Haslinger, Heidi Hein-Kircher, Kerstin S. Jobst, Jerzy Kochanowski, Claudia Kraft, Christian Lübke, Małgorzata Mazurek, Eduard Mühle, Alvydas Nikžentaitis, Ralph Tuchtenhagen Anna Veronika Wendland, Thomas Wünsch

Publication details
- Former name: Zeitschrift für Ostforschung
- History: 1952-present
- Publisher: Herder-Institute (Germany)
- Frequency: Quarterly
- Open access: Yes
- License: CC-BY-NC-ND

Standard abbreviations
- ISO 4: Z. Ostmitteleur.-Forsch.

Indexing
- ISSN: 0948-8294
- LCCN: 96652111
- OCLC no.: 455907993

Links
- Journal homepage

The Zeitschrift für Ostmitteleuropa-Forschung (Journal of East Central European Studies) is a quarterly peer-reviewed academic journal covering the history and culture of Eastern Europe. It is published by the Herder-Institut für historische Ostmitteleuropaforschung (English: "Herder Institute for Historical Research on East Central Europe"; Marburg).

== History ==
The journal was established in 1952 under the title Zeitschrift für Ostforschung (Journal for Research on the East) with Hermann Aubin, Herbert Schlenger, and Erich Keyser as editors. Until 1969, the journal was published by Elwert Verlag, but moved in 1994 to the Herder-Institut, obtaining its current name. Since 2017, the journal is also published with its English parallel title.

== Scope ==
The journal covers research on the history and culture of Poland, Slovakia, Belarus, Lithuania, Latvia, Estonia, Ukraine, the Czech Republic, Hungary, and the Russian enclave Kaliningrad. Besides scientific essays and miscellanea it also contains reviews and research reports. Furthermore, up to two of the four annual issues are guest-edited special issues. Reviews are available online for free.
