= Alexander Cartellieri =

German historian and medievalist (1867–1955)

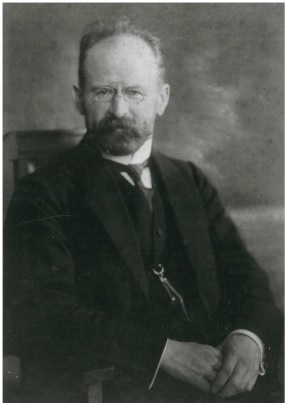
- Cartellieri in 1913
- Born: 19 June 1867; Odessa, Novorossiya, Russia
- Died: 16 January 1955; Jena, German Democratic Republic (East Germany)
- Education: University of Tübingen; Leipzig University; Friedrich Wilhelm University of Berlin
- Occupations: Archivist (de:Kommission für geschichtliche Landeskunde in Baden-Württemberg in Karlsruhe); Historian (medievalist); Writer; University professor and prorector (University of Jena)
- Spouse: Margarete Ornold (1870–1931)
- Children: Ilse Cartellieri/Prange (1896–1949); Walther Cartellieri (1897–1945); Wolfgang Cartellieri (1901–1969) and two others
- Parent(s): Leopold Cartellieri (1828–1903); German consul Cölestine Manger (1831–1918)

Alexander Cartellieri (19 June 1867 – 16 January 1955) was a German historian, principally of the High Middle Ages. Between 1904 and 1934 he held a full professorship for Medieval and Modern History at the University of Jena. After his retirement in 1934, he continued to live in Jena through the National Socialist years, the war, Soviet occupation and the early years of German partition.

A committed monarchist and, until the First World War, well networked internationally with fellow medievalists, his personal diaries, which have been extensively researched and analysed posthumously, provide insights which are enlightening about the times through which he lived, and quite possibly constitute a more important contribution to European historiography than any of his published articles and books on the Medieval centuries. The war led him to break off his international contacts, most importantly with French and Belgian medieval scholars. He was never reconciled to the post-imperial "Weimar Republic" (as Adolf Hitler scathingly termed the democratic regime that operated in Germany between 1919 and 1933, thereby popularising a term that was quickly adopted by historians during the 1930s). Cartellieri campaigned against the "burdensome and humiliating" Versailles peace treaty, even though – unlike many German historians of the time – he never retreated into a narrowly nationalist historical vision. After 1933, the foreign policy successes of the Hitler government impressed him, but he resisted or ignored any pressures to become a propagandist for a National Socialist government strategy that was more and more obviously based on violence, both domestically and on the world stage.

== Life ==
=== Provenance and early years ===
Alexander Maximilian Georg Cartellieri was born on 19 June 1867 in Odessa, a cosmopolitan and commercially vibrant Black Sea port which had been part of the Russian Empire since 1789. He was the third of his parents' five recorded children. Leopold Cartellieri (1828–1903), his father, was a businessman who at the time of Alexander's birth was serving as German consul in the city. On his father's side the family could trace their ancestry back to Eighteenth century Milan, where a number of Cartellieris had been professional musicians. Alexander Cartellieri's great grandfather Antonio Cartellieri (1772–1807), a composer of church music who made his career Germany, had himself been the son of two opera singers, respectively from Milan and Riga, who were also living and working, at the time of his birth, in northern Germany. Antonio Cartellieri had in 1786 been relocated with his mother to Königsberg in East Prussia, following his parents' divorce. Alexander Cartellieri's more recent Cartellieri ancestors had made their way in life not as musicians but as businessmen. His grandfather, Julius Friedrich Leopold Cartellieri (1795–1873), was a city councillor and at one stage the treasurer in the port city of Pillau (which after 1945 became part of the Soviet Union and was renamed Baltiysk/Балтийск). Alexander Cartellieri's mother, born Cölestine Manger (1831–1918), was the daughter of a mine owner, originally from Kassel. In 1872 the Cartellieris relocated from Odessa to Paris where the children grew up. The move was undertaken in connection with Leopold Cartellieri's work for the international "Ephrussi & Co." bank. Alexander Cartellieri was unusual among German university history professors in having been born and grown up abroad. A few months before they moved to Paris the Franco-Prussian War had ended in French defeat. The traumatic Siege of Paris, the emperor's proclamation of 18 January 1871 in the Palace of Versailles and the loss of Alsace-Lorraine were all fresh and raw in the minds of Parisians. The family's social contacts were accordingly restricted to the very small number of German families living in the city.

Cartellieri's father was a huge admirer of Chancellor Bismarck and an enthusiastic backer of unification. The father's linguistic talents and his patriotism influenced the son. Cartellieri was baptised as a Protestant. It was also important for his father that his birth be registered in the Imperial Register in 1867. While he was still young his parents arranged for tutors to come to the house to teach him French. He quickly became fascinated by the antiquar, lined up alongside the left bank of the Seine. An entry in his diary dated June 1882 recalls his decision "gradually to assemble [his] own collection of the most important classics, especially those that dealt with [his particular passion, which was already the study of] ... history". He was particularly fascinated by Leopold von Ranke, for many twentieth century historians an iconic figure, who had done much to redefine the study of History in Europe and North America. Cartellieri would much later describe Ranke as "the greatest historian of all peoples and times" (Note: ... der "größte Geschichtsschreiber aller Völker und Zeiten".) Another early focus of his historical passions, triggered by frequent walks in the Tuileries and to the royal tombs at Saint-Denis, involved the French monarchy.

In April 1883 Cartellieri was removed to the provincial German town of Gütersloh (between Dortmund and Hanover), which at that time had a population of fewer than 10,000. His father was keen that he should spend his later school years at a Gymnasium (secondary school) in Germany in order that he might complete the German school curriculum and gain admission to a German university. His father's longer-term ambition for him was that he should be able to enter government service in the new Germany. In addition to preparing him for university admission, three years in Gütersloh was an irresistible book-buying opportunity. He expanded his collection to above 400 volumes. These included von Ranke's already six volume "World History" series. His reading of the books inspired his decision, noted in his diary in November 1886, to become a university history professor. In February 1887 he passed his "Abitur" (school final exams), obtaining the highest marks in that year's cohort of candidates. He was quickly retired from completing his voluntary period of military service on account of the extent of his short-sightedness.

=== Student years in Tübingen, Leipzig and Berlin ===
At the start of the 1887, summer term Cartellieri enrolled at the University of Tübingen, where he studied History with Bernhard von Kugler. Away from the lectures and tutorials, during his time at Tübingen the nearby castle of the Hohenzollerns and the remaining ruins of Hohenstaufen Castle made a lasting impression on him. Subjects that particularly interested him at university, in addition to History, were Philosophy, Archaeology and Literature. He also continued to expand his personal collection of books, which by the time of his graduation had grown to become a personal history library. His parents were providing him with a generous 1,500 Mark annual allowance, and he shunned the dissolute life-style sometimes associated with well-funded students of the period, which left him with substantial funds for buying books. An important early acquisition was a book by the influential historian (and one-time home tutor to Felix Mendelssohn) Johann Gustav Droysen. After a year at Tübingen, armed with a letter of recommendation from his tutor, Bernhard von Kugler, Cartellieri transferred to Leipzig University. At Leipzig University, it was the Medievalist palaeographer Wilhelm Arndt who awakened Cartellieri's interest in Philip II of France. He became a regular presence at Wilhelm Maurenbrecher's lectures on eighteenth century history. In another part of the university, he was also able to attend, as a student, Wilhelm Wundt's "Laboratory of Popular and Experimental Psychology". In 1889 Cartellieri transferred again, this time to the Friedrich Wilhelm University of Berlin. His principal tutor here was Paul Scheffer-Boichorst, a man known for the rigour of his methodology in respect of historical sources. Having studied with Scheffer-Boichorst during the 1880s and 1890s would confer valuable professional cachet throughout the careers of those, such as Cartellieri, who went on to become university professors themselves. The lectures of Heinrich von Treitschke covering the principal topical themes of the day, such as the "Jewish question", the church-state rivalries known collectively to historians as the "Kulturkampf" and education reform, also made a lasting impression on him. It was, according to his own diaries, from von Treitschke that he acquired his defining "belief in the German nation and in the Prussian state". Alongside Heinrich von Treitschke, Otto von Bismarck was always a defining figure in German and world history, from Cartellieri's perspective.

At the end of 1890, Cartellieri completed his doctoral dissertation on the early life of King Philippe Auguste of France. It was published in Revue historique in 1893.

It was also in 1890 that Alexander Cartellieri met Margarete Ornold (1870–1931), the daughter of a Berlin lawyer. They married on 23 July 1894. Had he anticipated the posthumous publication of his diaries, he might or might not have confided to their pages his explanation that marriage seemed to him to be "still the best way to satisfy certain feelings .... [and] to get hold of a good cook, house keeper and carer" (Note: "Die Ehe ist immer noch das anständigste Mittel, gewisse Gefühle zu befriedigen ... gute Köchin, Haushälterin und Pflegerin [zu] bekommen".) According to at least one source, Cartellieri was able to benefit from "material support" from his Margarete's father for the rest of his life. The couple's five children included the jurist-historian Wolfgang Cartellieri, whose own children include the bank director Ulrich Cartellieri. Margarete Cartellieri did indeed look after the household, but she also helped him with his work, proof reading and correcting his books ahead of publication.

=== Archivist in Karlsruhe ===
After receiving his doctorate, with the backing of Scheffer-Boichorst, Cartellieri obtained a research post at the Baden Commission for Historical Studies, based in Karlsruhe. There, in 1892, the focus of his work became the "Regesta" (manuscript archives) of the Bishop of Konstanz ("Regesta episcoporum Constantiensium"). Some sort of basic indexing was already in place, but he was called upon to come up with descriptive entries in order to make the index more usable for researchers. This principally involved parchment records from the fourteenth and fifteenth centuries. He also had frequent recourse to source records not held in Karlsruhe, and there were regular "archive trips" south, to Lucerne, Konstanz, Bregenz, Lindau and Freiburg. He also visited the Vatican Archive to view source material on the Bishops of Konstanz between 1351 and 1383. While in Karlsruhe he was also preparing for the government teaching exams. In the end he seems to have suffered some sort of fainting attack, caused by overwork, and was instructed to take a four-week break.

He found it impossible to become very inspired by the "Regesta": "The wines extracted from the files and records are sleeping potions", he complained in his diary in September 1895. By simply combing through the archival source records, he was not acquiring any sort of contextual overview or understanding of the place of these documents in world history in respect of the period from which they came. On 6 April 1895 he passed his exams for qualification as an "Archivassessor" ("senior archivist"). Later, looking back, he would nevertheless recall his processing of the old "Regesta" as "exploitation" ("Ausbeutung") and "dull" ("stumpfsinnig"). (Despite Alexander Cartellieri's increasingly negative perception of the work, Otto Cartellieri, his younger brother who had also studied at Berlin under Paul Scheffer-Boichorst, and who would never be offered a full university professorship, would make archive work his life-long career, achieving a significant level of academic notability in the process.) Underwhelmed by the "Regesta" work he turned, when he could, to questions involving historical theory and historical philosophy, and preoccupied himself with the structure and classifications of world history. He became interested in Marx's ideas on "Historical materialism", Arthur de Gobineau's work on "Race" and Darwin's endlessly current "Theories of Evolution".

During his Karlsruhe years, Cartellieri authored many reviews of new French publications and established a network of contacts with colleagues, both in Germany and abroad. His more notable contacts included Léopold Victor Delisle, Director of the French National Library, and the medievalist historians Denis Jean Achille Luchaire and Charles Petit-Dutaillis. In 1894, he attended the Deutscher Historikertag (historians' convention) in Leipzig. Here he met Henri Pirenne, which was the start of a lasting professional and personal friendship between the two men.

He also engaged energetically in networking closer to home, participating in city life socially and becoming a member of a number of civic associations in Karlsruhe. He learned how to swim and to ride a bicycle in the Upper Rhine countryside. These activities, along with hiking and reading, became his favourite leisure pursuits as a young man.

=== Tutor at Heidelberg ===
In January 1898, Cartellieri left Karlsruhe. It is not clear whether his absence was intended as a brief sabbatical, or a permanent move, but as matters turned out he never returned to the "Regesta" cataloguing work. He pursued, with enhanced depth, his researches on King Philippe Auguste. The French king had already provided him with material for a doctorate, and he was encouraged in his further researches by Bernhard Erdmannsdörffer and Dietrich Schäfer who at this time were both employed as professors at nearby Heidelberg. There was agreement that the subject offered scope for a habilitation (higher academic degree) using, at least in part, research notes that Cartellieri had already accumulated while researching Philippe Auguste for no openly defined goal beyond his own pleasure and satisfaction. During 1898 he moved to Heidelberg where he started work as a research assistant with Dietrich Schäfer. He produced his habilitation dissertation, which was unambiguously a sequel to his 1891 doctoral dissertation, and in August 1899 received the degree. During the summer term, still at Heidelberg, he conducted his first tutorials on Latin Palaeography and delivered a lecture on France in the Middle Ages.

He continued to sustain close contacts with academic colleagues who, like him, had closer connections to foreign cultures than was typical for university history tutors in Germany. These included the Romanistics historian Karl Vossler who had a particular interest in contemporary philosophy and was a great admirer of Benedetto Croce. Another scholar to whom he was particularly close was the professor of ancient history, Alfred von Domaszewski, whose ancestors were mainly Polish and French rather than German. There were also frequent stimulating exchanges of ideas with the art historian Carl Neumann and the polymath-jurist Georg Jellinek. Neumann brought him closer to the work of Jacob Burckhardt, while Jellinek was able to guide him in respect of the differing constitutional structures of different foreign countries. Cartellieri would retain fond memories of his years Heidelberg for the rest of his life, later describing the period as "the conclusion to a wonderful adolescence".

=== Jena (1904–1935) ===
==== The young professor (1904–1913) ====
In 1902, Cartellieri was appointed to an administrative associate professorship for Medieval and Modern History at the University of Jena. At the start of the winter term 1904 to 1905, he succeeded Ottokar Lorenz, who had died that May, as Professor for History at the University of Jena. He had already established a name as a knowledgeable practitioner of French Medieval History. But he did not feel at home in Jena as he had in Heidelberg. He confided to his diary on 24 August 1913 that he still found the place cold and unfriendly (...ein "Popel-Nest"). From the same source it is clear that in 1904, he had intended the Jena appointment to his first full professorship as a stepping stone. But the hoped for offer of a full professorship at Heidelberg University, the Ludwig-Maximilians-Universität München or the Friedrich Wilhelm University of Berlin never materialised. When a suitable vacancy arose at Heidelberg University the post was offered to Karl Hampe: Hampe accepted. For Cartellieri this was a source of "piercing hurt". Three years later, when he actually met the man who had been his rival for the job, he was so stressed by the encounter that he had great difficulty in "speaking clearly and slowly".

The house which Cartellieri and his wife rented (and later purchased outright for 50,000 Marks) was one of the first in a new development of so-called "noble houses" ("executive homes") on the western side of Jena. It remained his home till his death in 1955. As a university professor in a still small city where industrialisation had arrived relatively late, and economic prosperity remained heavily dependent on the University of Jena, he occupied a privileged social position. The Cartellieri household included children's nannies, a cook and a parlour maid.

His full professorship having been confirmed, Cartellieri delivered his inaugural lecture (subsequently published as a 32-page booklet) on 12 November 1904. He took as his subject "the essence and structure of the study of history". Between 1904 and 1945 he supervised 144 doctoral dissertations and four habilitation dissertations. No fewer than fifty-five of those dissertations incorporated a strong focus on regional history, an academic discipline virtually never touched upon by scholars in more centralised states such as England and France. Among Cartellieri's more noteworthy students were the historians Ulrich Crämer, Willy Flach, Friedrich Schneider and Hans Tümmler. There were, however, only two – Friedrich Schneider and Helmut Tiedemann – who were supervised both for their doctorates and for their habilitations by Cartellieri.

Among colleagues at the University of Jena, Cartellieri was viewed as one who sided with the moderniser-reformers. As early as 1903, while sill only an associate professor, he put pen to paper in order to complain to the University Curator about the poorly equipped seminar rooms. He asked for more funding, especially for the library. Later, despite privately deploring the opening up of university facilities to female students in his diary, he was generally seen to be supportive of female students at Jena. By 1919 no fewer than ten of his doctoral students had been women, which in the context of the times was a remarkably high number. Several of his female doctoral students indeed received from his a coveted "cum laude" commendation for their dissertation. Käthe Nikolai was a doctoral student who received her degree from him in 1921, and thereafter became his long-standing research assistant. As his influence with the university administrators increased he was able to secure improvements both with respect to the seminar facilities and with regard to the books in the library, by stipulating a clear set of rules.

Cartellieri was the only History Professor at Jena whose lectures and examinations covered the entire chronological spectrum from late antiquity to contemporary history. He delivered a series of lectures on the French Revolution and Napoleonic era every year till his retirement in 1935, basing them on French sources and francophone historiography. Several times a week he also managed to take time out for strenuous walks in the nearby forest with fellow scholars, which became an integral feature of academic culture among colleagues.

==== War years ====
In common with many historians, Cartellieri's underlying beliefs were much affected by the First World War. By the start of 1914 his career was clearly on an upward trajectory. He had received the (probably largely honorary) title Hofrat in 1913. During Easter 1914 he accepted an appointment as university prorector which conferred certain administrative responsibilities and considerable status. He sustained more international contacts than ever, representing the University of Jena abroad. During 1913, he had also addressed a historians' congress in London at the start of the year and another in Vienna towards its ends. On both occasions his theme concerned his further researches on the French king, Philippe Auguste. He was also part of the new working group coming together to create a new Cambridge Medieval History series. His international networking may have been seen as excessive among one or two colleagues in Germany, however. Among university historians of the period he was on occasion identified simply as "the Frenchman".

On 28 June 1914, as Crown Prince Franz Ferdinand and his wife were being assassinated at Sarajevo, Cartellieri was on an international train, en route to a conference of university rectors in Groningen, at which he would represent the University of Jena. Cartellieri enjoyed international conferences, and garbled newspaper reports of a killing at the other end of the Austrian empire found little resonance either with the conference delegates or in the Dutch press. Of greater importance, as it seemed at the time, was the message he received that permission had finally been granted to start work on building an extension to the University Library in Jena later that year. The building work had been a constantly postponed item on the university's agenda for more than twenty years, and the library extension would provide researchers with access to an additional 250,000 books. Even after the details of the assassination became known and the international crisis began to accelerate towards the precipice of war, he was not conscious of any reluctance on the part of foreign academic colleagues to engage with the Germans. He was not unaffected, however: completion of the fourth and final volume of his great work on King Philippe Auguste was delayed, both by his prorectoral appointment and by the war. Cartellieri had been following a strictly chronological approach to his exposition, and had reached 1214 and the Battle of Bouvines just before the war broke out. Now, however, he faced the likelihood that his work would lose all its readers. Among Germans, the outbreak of war transformed King Philippe Auguste into a totem of French nationalism, and as such a wholly inappropriate research topic for a conventionally patriotic German historian. As Cartellieri's diaries reveal, the inopportune timing of a magnum opus dealing with the (French) King Philippe Auguste's victory over the (German) Emperor Otto IV at Bovines was only made worse by the battle's seven hundredth anniversary, in May 1914. In October 1914 he complained in his diary that, because of this, he "bore the suffering of that year of warfare like few other colleagues!" (Note: ... als "Leidtragender des Kriegsjahres wie wenig andere Kollegen!") Despite doubts about the topic and the prospect of much diminished readership among scholars in Germany, he nevertheless continued his research for his lengthy study of the French king, the final volume of which was eventually published in 1922.

In the end the First World War lasted for more than four years. During that time "war journalism" became a major media growth sector in Germany. It was a sector to which, in the judgement of one twenty-first century historian, roughly half of Germany's Medievalist professors contributed. Alexander Cartellieri was one of those historians whose underlying attitudes were transformed permanently by First World War and by the crisis-strewn early years of the republican government which followed. According to Matthias Steinbach, Cartellieri underwent an "interior change into an embittered nationalist, content to squander intellectual and heuristic energies in the fight against the enemy and, later, against the Versailles peace treaty". Steinbach also highlights a hardening and militarization of the diary entries during the first months of the war. Each reported victory by German troops is celebrated in the diaries. Cartellieri seems to be dreaming of a return to the pre-1806 Holy Roman Empire. Steinbach finds that this contrasts starkly with a speech Cartellieri had delivered in June 1914 in his capacity as university prorector, in which he had characterised France and Germany as "siblings at odds over an inheritance" and urged students to "recognise no frontier-posts in the intellectual struggle, but to set out boldly in order to conquer the non-destructive realm of knowledge". He had stressed back in 1914 that it had "never been the German way [to] transfer harsh political differences into the spiritual and personal spheres". That approach had changed by October 1914, when in an address to a student audience he asserted that military and economic armaments were not sufficient: intellectual Germany must also work for victory: "The victory of German arms shall open up new paths for the triumph of German ideas". Even though he had steeped himself in French culture for decades, in November 1916 he was writing of "France's thirst for revenge [over 1871]" which the neighbouring superpower wanted to quench at Germany's expense.

Using the pseudonym "Konrad", Cartellieri contributed, during 1914/15 to Eugen Diederichs's monthly magazine Die Tat, a publication produced in Jena which was devoted to the arts and politics, and which during the war became strikingly nationalistic. He used his "Konrad" pieces to try and recreate medieval imperialism for the twentieth century and, as he expressed it, "to preach and speak of emperor and empire". He presented medieval German kings and emperors as precursors for a powerful monarchy, of the kind that Germany should hope for in her present situation. It is unclear why Cartellieri ended his contributions to Die Tat in 1915: possibly he was uncomfortable with an editorial line that repeatedly stressed the contrast between German culture and the culture of western Europe more broadly. Apart from those "Konrad" articles, Cartellieri kept away from "war journalism". He wrote that he had no wish to "try and unveil the secrets of the General Staff, or to give them marks out of ten, using a few cards and newspaper headlines". On the other hand, he also did not engage politically, as might have been expected, in Dietrich Schäfer's "Non-aligned Committee for a German Peace" ("Unabhängige Ausschuss für einen deutschen Frieden") or in the ultra-conservative "Fatherland Party" ("Deutsche Vaterlandspartei").

Although university professors were relatively well remunerated during the first decades of the twentieth century, even for prosperous families such as the Cartellieris, the war years involved significant privation. Cartellieri was obliged to survive without a housekeeper and without a gardener, and was no longer to take the regular trips to the south of Europe to which he had become accustomed before 1914. He tried to keep in touch with those of his former students who had been sent to fight on the frontline, sending letters, sweets/candies and short papers. In 1915 his eldest son, Walther and his younger brother, Otto went off to join in the fighting. Between 1915 and 1918 Alexander Cartellieri increasingly withdrew from the present, and immersed himself in the Medieval world of knights and tales of the orient.

Following the German invasion of Belgium in August 1914, and in the context of the ensuing military occupation, Cartellieri's, the distinguished Wallon medievalist Henri Pirenne was questioned by the military authorities and then taken into custody, held successively in Krefeld, a hut in the camp on the edge of Holzminden, Jena (1916) and Creuzburg (from 1917 till the war ended). Shortly after his arrival in Jena, in August 1916 Pirenne met up with Cartellieri. The two men were at this time professional and personal friends of longstanding, but their views on the invasion of Belgium and the impact on each of them of subsequent events were understandably very different. Although Pirenne was detained, far from his family and against his will, the German authorities had recently relaxed the conditions of his detention. He was now required to report to the authorities only twice per week, and was otherwise left at large in Jena, though there is no mention in German-language sources of any relaxation of the condition imposed – according to French-language sources – in 1914, whereby he was prohibited from accessing any books. He devoted much of his time to authorship (from memory) and also took the opportunity to master the Russian language through oral instruction received from fellow detainees. While he was detained in Jena, Alexander Cartellieri was the only person whose company Pirenne sought out. After a long walk that the two men took together in January 1917, Cartellieri confided to his diary that he thought Pirenne "an exceptionally clever man, unfailingly obliging in discussion, but of course subject to the limitations to be expected of any Frenchman". (Note: "... ein ausnehmend kluger und in der Erörterung verbindlicher Mann, freilich in den Grenzen, die einem Franzosen Gesteck".) At the end of 1917 Pirenne was moved again, this time to Creuzburg, a small town with a large fortress, nestling in the countryside to the west of Erfurt. It quickly became clear that the former friendship between the two eminent scholars had cooled. They no longer met up or exchanged letters. In 1920 Henri Pirenne published a memoire of his German captivity covering the period from March 1916 till November 1918. He characterised Alexander Cartellieri as one of those German professors, hooked on conquest, who shared in the blame for the World War.

Right up till the end of September 1918, Cartellieri continued to believe that the war might deliver a happy outcome for Germany. As a result of the Russian Revolution, the country had been "liberated for ever from the dangerous threat in the east". To the west, he continued to hope for an Anglo-American falling out. He held on to his "belief in Germany" throughout the war. On 8 November 1918 he noted, that "the firm belief in the German real, in the fatherland, cannot be shaken".

By the end of the war Cartellieri had built his library beyond 18,000 volumes: he would never own more books. According to Matthias Steinbach, who has made a study of the matter, there were only three other men in Germany with comparable book collections: the sociologist Werner Sombart, the international economist Joseph Schumpeter and the polymath-sociologist Max Weber. Abroad there were, at the time, perhaps two other men with comparable private book collections: the philosophers Benedetto Croce in Naples and Henri Bergson in Paris.

==== Peace and the republic ====
The rolling revolutions of 1918/19 came as a great shock to Cartellieri. The tone of his diary entries sharpens. The Abdication of Wilhelm II on 9 November 1918 created a "day of irreversible shame for Germany": that shame could "only be washed away by blood". The armistice terms imposed on 11 November 1918 were "terrible". On 13 November he wrote, "Who could be so dumb as to believe in the League of Nations, if we permanently lose Elsaß-Lothringen? Wolf [his son] says at once 'we'll take it back!' Bravo, that's how the young people have to think, and I look forward to experiencing that retribution." Cartellieri wanted to use his speeches on the creation of the empire and his lectures on supposed "war guilt" to support an enhanced sense of nationhood. His lectures nevertheless tended to avoid an overtly political commitment. He insisted that he did not wish "to pour anger into the past". (Note: "... keinen Zorn in die Vergangenheit hineinzugiessen.")

Like many of those who had been appalled by the emperor's enforced abdication, Cartellieri completely rejected the republican regime which during the 1930s became known (in a term originated by Adolf Hitler in a speech of snarling contempt) as the Weimar Republic. Cartellieri had no great respect for "parliamentary principles", and adhered uncompromisingly to the view that no legitimate state authority can be based on a lot of slips of paper (i.e. ballot papers). The general election held on 19 January 1919 was Germany's first general election to use Proportional representation. It was the first time women were permitted to vote. The minimum voting age was reduced from 25 to 20. Despite Cartellieri's loathing of the rapidly emerging post-imperial constitutional arrangements, he and his entire family turned out and voted with more than 30 Million others. (In the previous general election, held in 1912, a little over 12 million people had voted.) Unanimously (it was recorded by Cartellieri), they "voted nationalist", "mainly to bring Clemens von Delbrück in [and] create some dams against the storm surge of democratic ideas". Cartellieri would continue conscientiously to record every election in his diary right up till the Adenauer years. He despised social democracy and distanced himself from the Labour movement. He took a close interest in political developments in Italy and the 1922 Fascist take-over. For Cartellieri, the March on Rome represented "the first significant anti-socialist movement since the French Revolution". When the Catholic centrist politician Matthias Erzberger was murdered by right-wing terrorists in August 1921, Cartellieri's diary entry was lacking in human empathy: it characterised the late Erzberger as one of the "fatherland's worst pests". In view of his antiparliamentary stance in post-imperial Germany, Cartellieri cannot be identified as one of the so-called "Vernunftrepublikaner" (loosely, "republicans by pragmatism"): yet he conducted himself with unremarkable "constitutional loyalty". The biographer Matthias Steinbach places him closer to those who acknowledged the Weimar constitution from a sense of what was reasonable under the circumstances than to the die-hard "national-conservative" professors such as Dietrich Schäfer, Johannes Haller and Max Lenz. The unity of the state was his top priority, and he accordingly put up with the new republican state structure. He might have seen his university lectures as an opportunity to speak out against the government, but he did not. In this and other respects, he was not untypical of the people who supported the "National People's Party" ("Deutschnationale Volkspartei" / DNVP). During the later 1920s and early 1930s, which was a period of intensifying political gridlock in the parliament ("Reichstag") and polarisation on the streets, Cartellieri generally voted for the DNVP or, latterly, for the conservative-liberal "People's Party" ("Deutsche Volkspartei" / DVP).

Throughout the years of the republic, Alexander Cartellieri was one of many for whom the consequences of punitive terms imposed at Versailles continued to rankle. He rejected the "war guilt" hypothesis. He stressed, instead, "the love of peace and self-restraint ... which Germany [had demonstrated] under all sorts of circumstances before the war". The need to repudiate the "war guilt" hypothesis led him to engage actively with the working groups and committees of the "Vereinigte Vaterländische Verbände Deutschlands" (loosely, "United German Patriotic Associations") and to join in defending the "war guilt lie" hypothesis. Cartellieri was also a propagator of the (subsequently) infamous Stab-in-the-back legend. It is evident from his diaries that he longed for a Hohenzollern restoration. In 1922, writing that he could now track his diary entries all the way back to 1915, he noted with wonder in 1922, the mood of optimistic pride and good cheer that had still prevailed back then.

The next year Ilse Cartellieri, daughter of Alexander Cartellieri, married the Eutin geographer Max Prange (1891–1979). The marriage was followed by the births of their three recorded children. These included the historian Wolfgang Prange (1932–2018).

The hyperinflation of 1922/23 took its toll on university salaries, and after 1922 the Cartellieris were no longer able to enjoy the standard of living that they would have taken for granted before 1914. Alexander Cartellieri sold part of his library in order to be able to buy groceries, and magazine subscriptions were cancelled. Although university salaries were increased with increasing frequency in order to try and match price rises, for much of the time Cartellieri's salary was virtually worthless. After currency stabilisation began to take effect, he was earning an annual salary of 3,500 Marks, which was approximately twice that of an unskilled worker.

The diaries contain several indications that during the 1920s Cartellieri became frustrated over the extent of his professional achievements. As early as 21 December 1921 he wrote in his diary, "My passionate yearning somehow to influence my times and the future, will perhaps never be fulfilled ... I would have loved to have been able to be of service to great men, I would have served them loyally in the old German manner, [but] the opportunity never came: I was unloved!". (Note: "Mein heißes Verlangen, irgendwie einzuwirken auf meine Zeit, auf eine spätere Zeit, wird vielleicht nie erfüllt werden [...] Gerne hätte ich großen Männern gedient, ich wäre ihnen nach altgermanischer Art treu gewesen, es fand sich dazu keine Gelegenheit, geliebt hat mich auch keiner".) That mood was with him on 28 November 1928 when he wrote, "What will be left of me? A cold obituary in the HZ?" (Note: "Was wird von mir bleiben? Ein frostiger Nekrolog in der HZ?")

Alongside his work at the University of Jena, Cartellieri served as deputy chair of the "Association for Thuringian History and Antiquity". He sat on the advisory board of the "Society of Friends of the University" and was also a member of the exclusive inner-circle at the Weimar-based German Dante Society. In February 1933, a few weeks after the Hitler government took power in Berlin, Alexander Cartellieri was accepted as a member of the Saxon Academy of Sciences and Humanities.

During the crisis years that directly preceded the toppling of republican democracy, Cartellieri's diaries become increasingly preoccupied with his private life. His younger brother, Otto Cartellieri, died suddenly and unexpectedly while vacationing in Switzerland in April 1930. Tragedy came even closer to home with the death of his wife in March 1931. Plunged into deep personal crisis, for the next couple of years Cartellieri found little space in his diaries for current events. After Margarete died, he tried several times to form new partnerships, hoping to marry again, but that never happened.

==== Germany under Hitler ====
In March 1932 Cartellieri read "Hitlers Weg" (loosely, "Hitler's Path") by the commentator and liberal politician Theodor Heuss. Heuss was no fan of National Socialism: his critical study of Hitler's politics would run to eight editions and be translated into three additional languages. But with millions unemployed, street politics polarised and parliament deadlocked by the mutual hatreds of extremism, a few weeks later Alexander Cartellieri used the 1932 presidential election to vote for Adolf Hitler. (Note: The other candidates were the incumbent Paul von Hindenburg, by now aged 82, and the Communist candidate, Ernst Thälmann.) It is apparent from his diary entries of the time that despite having voting for the "least bad" presidential option, he retained severe misgivings about Hitler. Visceral backing for revision of the Treaty of Versailles, widely seen in Germany as punitive, his robust rejection of the messy party based politics of democratic government in action and the hunger which he shared for national revival came together to persuade Cartellieri to back Hitler's promises with his vote. Cartellieri also shared the National Socialists' strong anti-communism. On 28 March 1938 he would write in his diary, "'Without [the Battle of] Jena, no [Battle of] Sedan, as Bismarck said [after his retirement in 1892, while on a visit to] Jena' .... in the future people will have to say 'without Versailles, no National Socialism'". Steinbach characterises Cartellieri's attitude to National Socialism as that of "the approving sceptic". After reading the leader's autobiographical manifesto Mein Kampf in May 1933, Cartellieri shared his doubts with his diary: "What does he actually want in the east? He doesn't say. Launch an attack on Russia and settle Germans there? Is there really a space for us?"

By 1933 Cartellieri had passed his sixty-fifth birthday, and no longer felt a necessity to advance his career at the University of Jena. According to one commentator, he now felt able to observe developments after that point with "a mixture of national loyalty and aristocratic distance. He was not a party member, never engaged actively on behalf of the party and never spoke out in support of it in public.

In March 1933, a couple of weeks after the Reichstag fire, Cartellieri's diary entries disclose a heartfelt optimism, with regard to the new régime, "... that our so-called revolution in 1918, this dumb, criminal, and above all unnecessary revolution will be undone". His initial assumption was that the Hitler government was simply a transitional arrangement: "You have to go along with [Hitler]", he wrote in his diary on 1 May 1933, "because of its failure would deliver only collapse and Bolshevism. Perhaps he'll come to grief in Russia ... so long as we hold on to the current government. That would be for the best". For many people the so-called Röhm-Putsch ("Night of the long knives") on the night of 30 June/1 July 1934 came as an unwelcome eye-opener. In effect, it amounted to the murder, on the orders of Adolf Hitler, of the entire leadership of the Sturmabteilung, a Nazi paramilitary organisation that might constitute a future threat to the government. The killings had been performed without any judicial sentencing or other court involvement. Even though it constituted what subsequent generations would identify as a terrorist act by the government, Cartellieri's diary entries show no appreciation of the gravity of what had been done: he welcomed the "decision" and hoped that the outcome would be "a major improvement in general conditions".

Matthias Steinbach has concluded from his exhaustive analyses that Cartellieri's diaries do contain occasional antisemitic echoes. The historian Karel Hruza has found frequent negative references in the diaries to Jewish academic colleagues, such as Hermann Bloch, Hedwig Hintze and Ernst Kantorowicz. But Cartellieri held firmly to the Humboldt Educational Principal and resolutely protested against all attempts to politicise the university. As early as 1930, he spoke out against the appointment to the University of Jena's newly created "teaching chair for the study of ‘Race Science’" of the pseudoscientist and racism populariser, Hans F. K. Günther. The appointment was made through the direct intervention – in itself controversial – of Wilhelm Frick, the Thuringian state Minister for Internal Affairs, Education and the Arts. (Frick had already acquired political notability in 1929 as the first National Socialist politician to be achieve ministerial appointment in a state/regional government anywhere in Germany.) Cartellieri was shaken by the enforced resignation of the medical historian Theodor Meyer-Steineg, following the implementation of the government's so-called Law for the Restoration of the Professional Civil Service, and he later recorded in his diaries his shock at the anti-Jewish laws that came in the wake of the short but savage nationwide pogrom of November 1938. In order to try and reconcile his admiration for Adolf Hitler with his horror at the race-based persecution practiced by the government, Cartellieri returned to Philippe Auguste. In 1182 the French king had ordered the expulsion of all Jews from the royal demesne and the destruction of homes in the Jewish quarter of Paris, in order to make space for a vast new food market. He had then "recalled them" or "readmitted them" in 1198, albeit on terms more restricted than before the expulsion. Despite the dislike of government antisemitism evident in his diaries, for some years Cartellieri kept his misgivings to himself. But by the time he published the fourth volume of the "World History" ("Weltgeschichte als Machtgeschichte") series in 1941, something had changed. He included a bold judgement which, in view of the populist antisemitic position that had become mainstream among younger faculty colleagues, stands out as remarkable. In discussing the antisemitic arracks and massacres which erupted in the Rhineland at the end of the eleventh century as part of the build-up to the First Crusade, he shared with readers the assessment that those actions had brought "ruin to many who participated in them and, of course, to many innocent people .... and attracted great disapproval from contemporaries".

It is not entirely clear who Cartellieri thought would be reading his diaries: it is entirely possible that he was aware of the possibility or risk that they might somehow fall into the hands of some government agency. In January 1935 he writes, "I must take frightful care to control myself, so as not to say something dumb". The next sentence offers a further clue as to what might have been on his mind: "I am endlessly positive about National Socialism, not just at present, but already since a long time". (Note: "Ich muss mich furchtbar zusammennehmen, um nicht auch etwas Dummes zu sagen. Dabei bejahe ich unendlich viel vom Nationalsozialismus und nicht erst heute, sondern lange vorher.") It could nevertheless be hard to keep up with the latest requirements. In 1935 the newly installed rector received a complaint against Cartellieri and his colleague Georg Mentz from an eager young (probably government appointed) university administrator: they had failed to join in with a rendition of the Horst Wessel song, and they had also failed to raise their arms high enough when giving the "Hitler Greeting".

=== Retirement ===
After retiring in 1935 Cartellieri concentrated on his multi-volume project "Weltgeschichte als Machtgeschichte" ("The History of the World as a History of Power") which would eventually extend to five volumes and cover the years from 382 till 1190, though only the first four volumes would be published during his lifetime. The fifth volume, covering the age of Frederick Barbarossa, would be published only in 1972, seventeen years after the author's death.

The historians Matthias Steinbach and Herbert Gottwald conclude that he retained an emotionally fuelled "Nibelungentreue" faith in Hitler to the end, irrespective of the doubts that sometimes surface in the diary entries. He was, in particular, inspired by Hitler's foreign policy successes. In 1938 he confided to his diary, "I believe I have understood the genius of Hitler. I recognise that a man of the people had to rise up, just as the Maid of Orléans did after Agincourt and Troyes; but quite a lot of what gets done in Hitler's name makes me deeply uncomfortable". (Note: "Ich glaube Verständnis für Hitlers Genialität zu haben, erkenne an, dass ein Mann aus dem Volke aufstehen musste, wie nach Azincourt und Troyes die Jungfrau von Orléans, aber gar manches, was in Hitlers Namen getan wird, will mir gar nicht behagen.") For Cartellieri, the idea of the "Fatherland" stood above any leadership principal or cult. On 12 November 1939 he wrote, "The leader may fall, and the banner of the fatherland can be carried forward by others. .... Hitler has already taken care of that: Göring, Rudolf Hess. It is to be hoped that [Hitler] will live a long time." (Note: "Der Führer kann fallen, die Fahnen des Vaterlandes können von anderen weitergetragen werden. […] Hitler hat ja schon vorgesorgt: Göring, Rudolf Hess. Hoffentlich lebt er lange.") He followed events in Austria with particular interest, greeting the annexation in March 1938 with enthusiasm: "through this, Austria will not sink into the Slavic deluge". He identified four classes of enemy in Austria: Catholics, [Hapsburg] legitimists, Socialists-Communists and Jews. One francophone reviewer identifies this "indeed troubling" line as the principal piece of evidence that the diaries contain of Cartellieri's antisemitism, but goes on to insist that plenty of other passages demonstrate convincingly that Cartellieri was not an anti-Semite. A little more than two years later, as France fell, Cartellieri records his wish that the armistice of June 1940 would be endorsed by a permanent treaty signed at the Palace of Versailles, in order to expunge the hated treaty of 29 June 1919, and renew the Imperial Proclamation of 18 January 1871. Even under National Socialism, for Alexander Cartellieri the old imperial government structure remained the proper government structure for Germany ("...die für Deutschland gegebene Lebensform"). And despite holding the former emperor Wilhelm II in deep contempt, it is clear from his diaries that he continued to believe that a Hohenzollern must be the emperor.

October 1941 found Cartellieri complaining in his diary about emigrants, whom he characterised as Germany's "worst enemies" ("die schlimmsten Feinde"). Christian Amalvi, a twenty-first century commentator infers that he was thinking, in particular, of Germany's leading intellectuals, such as Berthold Brecht and Thomas Mann (both of whom are recalled by subsequent generations as high-profile anti-nazis who did indeed escape to the America, respectively in 1933 and 1939). In July 1944 he recorded the assassination attempt against the leader with indignation, condemning the perpetrators; but he also noted with relief (having presumably taken his information from the press reports of the time) that "the leader [had] suffered no serious injuries". After 1942 the possibility that Germany might lose a second "world war" was, for many observers, no longer unthinkable. Even after being told by a recently returned officer just how dire the military situation on the Russian front had become, Cartellieri refused to admit – apparently even to himself – the possibility of defeat. During the final weeks of the war news came through that Walter, his eldest son, had been killed in the fighting in Northern Italy. In his diary entry of 25 March 1945 Cartellieri was still expressing confidence that the tide of the war could be turned through rapid deployment of the new V-2 rockets. In a diary entry on 13 April 1945 he recorded the hope that the recent death of President Roosevelt might foreshadow a miracle equivalent to that resulting from the death of Russia's Empress Elizabeth in 1761, news of which came through in January 1762, and was widely credited with having preserved Prussia from seemingly certain destruction at the end of the "Seven Years' War". Elsewhere, especially during the final months of the war, his diaries compare Hitler to "great men" from the past such as Frederick the Great, Napoleon and Bismarck.

In 1942, the National Socialists marked his seventy-fifth birthday by dedicating a lengthy article to Alexander Cartellieri in Nationalsozialistische Monatshefte, a monthly magazine produced by the party in Munich. He received a personal letter of congratulations from the "Führer und Reichskanzler" ("Leader and national chancellor"). Karl Astel, the war-time university rector of the University of Jena, congratulated him personally. He also received the Goethe Medal for Arts, Humanities and Sciences in recognition of his contribution to Historical Scholarship. Matthias Steinbach believes that the sudden outburst of interest in Cartellieri from the National Socialists was based on two things. It enabled them to present a supposedly impartial version of history, free from ideology and dogma. Also, Cartellieri's tendency to see all history as the history of great men resonated strongly with the National Socialist vision of how the world worked, or at least of how it should work.

=== Final years ===
War ended in May 1945. Very soon it became impossible not to be aware of the Holocaust. By now in his late 70s, there is no sign of self-criticism in Cartellieri's diaries. He did not believe that the nation's university professors had been complicit in the rising National Socialist tide that had swept away democracy and imposed fascism in the 1930s and 1940s: "Most of the people knew absolutely nothing about the atrocities in the concentration camps". The historical interpretation which he now advocated identified Hitler not as a specifically German problem but as a European problem. Without the fall of the empire and the Treaty of Versailles, Hitler could never have taken power. Just as he always had, Cartellieri continued to believe that "empire" had provided Germany with the "best" form of government. On 22 September 1946 he wrote in his diary: "No person of understanding can possibly doubt that if the 'Sozzen' (socialists), with their republican psychosis, had not driven the emperor away, the NSDAP could never have come to power". (Note: Kein Verständiger kann bezweifeln, dass wenn die Sozzen nicht in ihrer Republikpsychose den Kaiser verjagt hätten, die NSDAP nie zur Macht gelangt wäre.)

Jena was badly damaged during the final months of the war by U.S. bombing, but Cartellieri's house was largely spared. War and its aftermath had nevertheless torn his family apart. His eldest son had been killed in Northern Italy during the final days of the fighting. Jena and the surrounding region had ended up administered as part of the post-war Soviet occupation zone. In February 1949 Ilse Prange, his daughter, died. His surviving children, with hundreds of thousands of others, seem to have taken the opportunity presented by the still relatively porous condition of the border between the occupation zones into which Germany had been divided to flee to the British and American occupation zones in the west. Alexander Cartellieri became increasingly cut off from the rest of his family. Many colleagues and friends had also perished in the war or else started new loves in the west. Cartellieri felt he could not leave his home in Jena because it would have meant leaving behind the substantial book collection which he had been able to build up after the traumatic experience of having to sell off many of his most valuable volumes during the economic collapse of the early 1920s in order to be able to feed himself and his family, and his final years were, at least on the domestic front, lonely. In September 1949, the rector Otto Schwarz of the University of Jena (who had been a party member since the formation of The Party in 1946) informed him that his allowance of so-called "intelligence cards" was to be withdrawn. "Intelligence cards" were supplementary ration coupons with which privileged comrades – apparently including retired university professors – were able to obtain discounts and / or a wider choice in respect of the food ration than the mass of comrades. The rector helpfully explained that his mistake had been to criticise the (party-backed) People's Congress movement. It had also been noted that he had spoken critically about the political situation in the Soviet occupation zone (relaunched, in October 1949, as the Soviet sponsored German Democratic Republic). For the second time in his life, he now found himself obliged to start selling off or swapping some of his precious books in order to buy food. An appreciative American took a copy of "Ex Guidonis de Bazochiis cronosgraphie libro septimo" in exchange for honey from Moscow in Idaho. In 1951, Josef Hämel took over as rector of the University of Jena and Cartellieri's entitlement to "intelligence cards" was restored.

Inspired by the increased interest in and awareness of technical progress which the war had stimulated, during his final years Cartellieri was drawn to new areas of interest, on the frontiers between history and science, such as the change in the speed at which people travelled as the Middle Ages progressed, and the way in which plagues were caused and spread during the Staufer period. He continued working away at the fifth volume of his "World History" ("Weltgeschichte als Machtgeschichte"). He continued taking his regular walks even in extreme old age, and evidently remained socially networked within the university community. He received congratulations on the occasion of his eighty-fifth birthday from the mayor at a public ceremony which, as matters turned out, was his final public appearance. The rector and prorector passed on birthday wishes from the party at the same time. From Freiburg, beyond the Inner German border to the west, there came a more barbed plaudit from another longstanding monarchist history professor, Gerhard Ritter: "Absolutely no one will argue with your status as the leading historian of the German Democratic Republic". (Note: "Ihnen ... wird wohl niemand den Rang als führender Historiker der DDR streitig machen".)

It was also, as far as can be determined from surviving sources, in 1953 that Cartellieri stopped keeping his diaries. He died alone at Jena, a couples of years later, on 16 January 1955.

== Works ==
Between 1890 and 1952 Cartellieri produced more than 200 publications, with which he advanced the Rankean historiographical tradition. Context came from his wish to present and conserve the idea of a historical unity between the "German and Roman civilisations". He preferred "big picture history" to detailed study. His early publications were regional historical studies of the clergy in the Prince-Bishopric of Konstanz. After that he turned his focus to France, principally working on the 24 years between the Third Crusade and the Battle of Bouvines. From there he moved on to his universal historical study. His two most substantial works were his four volume biography of King Philippe Auguste (1165–1223), published between 1899 and 1922, and the five volumes on "Weltgeschichte als Machtgeschichte" ("The History of the World as a History of Power"), published between 1927 and 1972, of which the fifth appeared only posthumously. Among academics these works were highly regarded, especially in France and Belgium. For many colleagues in the German academic establishment, during a period of traditionalist, and later stridently populist nationalism, they nevertheless placed Cartellieri "outside the club", as something of an unpatriotic outsider. There was nevertheless something of the traditionalist Anglo-German approach in his historical appreciation that all "great men" in history must, by definition, permanently reshape the future. Cartellieri evidently had little time for specialist academic journals, dismissing such "magazines" on at least one occasion as "the beer cellars and coffee shops of scholarship". (Note: "Zeitschriften sind die Bierstuben und Kaffeehäuser der Wissenschaft.") When it came to producing reviews of the work of other colleagues, Cartellieri does not adopt the scathing bombastic tone familiar from his diaries: his published reviews almost all employ a careful matter-of-fact approach.

=== Revolutions and the growth in state power ===
Much of Cartellieri's early published work deals with the growth in the external power of the state. Directly after the war ended he turned to presenting an overview of domestic power struggles in r3cent centuries. That was followed in 1921 by a characteristically panoramic work on the "History of modern revolutions: From English Puritanism to the Paris Commune (1642–1871)". The work drew on his long-standing interest in the topics covered, but also reflected the author's own far more recent experiences of revolution in Germany following the destruction and military defeat of the "World War". According to the Cartellieri scholar Matthias Steinbach the book is in essence a simple factual presentation: Cartellieri wanted to clarify the different views in ways that would enable his reader to form his or her own judgements. Respecting the tradition of Ranke, Cartellieri accepts as axiomatic both the conditionality and the mutual interdependence of events and conditions in France and in Germany in the period between 1789 and 1871. He always seeks to construe the shifts between reform, revolution and reaction in their full European dimension.

=== Biography of Philippe Auguste ===
Cartellieri was one of only a very few German historians whose principal focus was on the history of France. Only the medievalists Robert Holtzmann and Fritz Kern dealt with French medieval history with comparable levels of intensity. In 1913 the francophone Belgian Henri Pirenne described Cartellieri as "the most knowledgeable [historian] today on west European history in the twelfth century". Over the course of three decades Cartellieri researched the life and times of France's King Philip II ("Philippe Auguste"). His underlying thesis was that, under Philippe Auguste, France acquired "great power" status, engaging with significant effect in European power politics. Even in the king's early actions, Cartellieri detected "the early maturing and essentially political direction of his spirit and character". He attributed Philippe Auguste's hatred of England to "the impressions that the bright boy had taken in, at least in part unknowingly, when he saw how his father's entire being and legacy had been consumed in defending himself against this overmighty enemy". In contrast to what was, the assessment traditional among German historians at the time, he saw the epoch-defining 1214 Battle of Bouvines (in which an allied army including a small force of English soldiers was soundly defeated by a smaller but more disciplined army commanded by King Philip), "not [as a crowning] anti-German policy, but as the event that sealed the destruction of the Angevin Empire". (Note: "...nicht eine deutsch-feindliche Politik des französischen Königs, sondern besiegelte den Zusammenbruch des angevinischen Reiches".) The context in which the war of 1213/1214 was fought was not one in which King Philip was the enemy of "Germany". The background to the conflict between the French and the Anglo-Normans was rather, at least primarily, one of dynastic rivalries between the Houses of the Plantagenets and of the Capétiens.

=== Cartellieri's universal historiography ===
Cartellieri's "Grundzüge der Weltgeschichte 382–1914" ("Underlying principles of world history ...") was published in 1919, directly following the First World War. Already, he was presenting the history of the world as the history of power. Between 1923 and 1947 he was working on a multi-volume "Weltgeschichte" ("World History"). It was a political history of the origins and early phases, during the Middle Ages of the western world, and of its frequently overlapping or interlocking relationship with Islamic civilisation. He was keen to having the scope of the work defined by far more than simply the history of nations and states: instead he sought, in the first instance, to summarize world history in terms of the roles played by the leading personalities from each generation, whose achievements in their respective fields had stood the test of time. He followed the sources closely, seeking to give his own presentation and enduring timeless quality. "It is only right and proper", he wrote in the foreword to his first volume, "to raise world history to the level of a deserving subject for academic study, by not permitting it to say anything that cannot be proven: that is directly or indirectly traced back to the sources". He did not subdivide the period under discussion into conventionally "manageable" chronologically arranged chunks. He did not want to discuss or differentiate between the defining characteristics of antiquity and the middle ages, and he certainly did not want to write about the generality of "medieval people". He was concerned, he confided to readers of his diary, not to "clarify" contentious details, but rather to "hold fast to the essentials". Cartellieri understood world history as the history of power, an approach which he explained as "political history with particular regard to relations between states". The guiding principal for Cartellieri he described as the "eternally unchanging general human experience of power-play, always concealed within new wrappings". (Note: "... ewig unveränderliche, sich unter immer neuen Hüllen verbergende Machttrieb gemäß der allgemein menschlichen Erfahrung") His presentation starts with the Roman Empire, "...the prerequisite for everything that has happened in the Romano-German world ever since". (Note: "...das die Voraussetzung für alles bildet, was in der romanisch-germanischen Welt seitdem geschehen ist".) The more precise starting point which he takes for his multi-volume "Underlying principles of world history" is the final treaty concluded by Emperor Theodosius on 3 October 382 with the advancing Western Goths (Thervingi), an event chosen by Cartellieri because it marks with particular clarity a critical moment in the diminution of what would later become known as the "western empire". By emphasizing the power-hunger of individual communities and their overlords, he implicitly downplayed sociological and economic factors. The first volume, published in 1927, covered the emergence and founding of new empires and the years between 382 and 911. The final volume, "The age of Barbarossa (1150–1190)" appeared only posthumously, in 1972. He had completed the manuscript during the later 1940s, but it was eventually prepared for publication by the wife of his grandson, Ulrich Cartellieri.

=== Diary ===
Cartellieri kept a diary between 1 January 1878 and Autumn 1954. For 25 years he added to it almost every day. After 1903, the updating of it became a weekly exercise. The final entry, dated 1 November 1954, ends with an unanswered question, "How much longer do I have to keep on sacrificing myself?" Cartellieri himself reckoned that the diaries were of interest "less because [he had] experienced much of importance, than because of the completeness of the entries, right back to [his] childhood". In writing the diaries, he addressed them to what he hoped would be "uncorrupted future generations", who might be more appreciative than contemporaries.

The 12,000 pages show precisely how Cartellieri experienced successively the Wilhelmine empire, the German republic, twelve years of Hitler and nearly a decade of the divided Germany. He also, as the project progressed, wished to provide future generations with "a detailed portrait of the university". Over time the diary became, in addition, a work-diary in which "the author" recorded extensive notes about work plans and university matters. In terms of their extent and the way they evolved over a succession of epochs in Cartellieri's life, they bear comparison with the diaries of Victor Klemperer and Harry Graf Kessler. Today Cartellieri's diaries are part of his literary estate, held at the Jena University Library.

== In retrospect ==
Cartellieri's two volume biographical study of Philip II remains a standard work of German historiography a century after it was first published. The enduring value of the work lies in the author's methodological precision, his disciplined application of a clear and reliable chronology and his well considered and presented judgments of the French king and his actions. Writing in 1996, the medievalist Joachim Ehlers insisted that the work was "still indispensable" ("noch ... unentbehrlich") because of the way in which it is scrupulously based on identified sources. Irrespective of its underlying merits, Cartellieri's work on Philippe Auguste was not sufficiently persuasive to shift the mainstream assessment the Battle of Bouvines. During the nineteenth century, with nationalism a powerful force in European historiography, the battle came to be seen as symbolic of French strength and German weakness. It was not till the 1970s that new avenues of research introduced a more nuanced set of understandings of the battle and its significance.

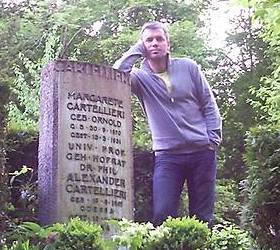
Cartellieri scholar Dr. Matthias Steinbach leaning on the grave memorial of Alexander Cartellieri in the "Nordfriedhof" (cemetery) in Jena 2012

Even among his contemporaries, there were none who would have picked out Alexander Cartellieri as one of the leading medievalists of his generation. In the Soviet occupation zone and the German Democratic Republic, in which he lived out the final decade of his retirement, history quickly came to be dominated by the Marxist world vision. There was no room for Cartellieri in that. After his death, Cartellieri's 16,000 volume library was purchased by the University of Jena: for more than three decades the collection was left to fester, largely undisturbed. During 1989, a first-year history student at the University of Jena, Matthias Steinbach, undertook his first visit to the Manuscripts Department of the University Library and noticed the 16,000 volume collection. He was unable to avoid wondering who might have collected so many volumes – many of them not even in German, but in French or in Italian – in Jena. (Neither France nor Italy was among the small number of countries that most East Germans were permitted to visit between 1949 and 1989.) Steinbach's curiosity was the starting point for several years of study that culminated, nine years later, and after first obtaining his first degree and his national teaching qualifications, in Steinbach's doctoral dissertation about Alexander Cartellieri. The doctorate was awarded in 1998 and the dissertation appeared in an expanded and adapted form as a book in 2001. Cartellieri has been at the heart of Steinbach's work as a historian since that time. Even for Steinbach, however, Cartellieri was "not [to be included among] the leading figures in German cultural and academic life during the fifteen years between the German Empire and the National Socialist dictatorship". His teaching and research work on the History of Revolutions nevertheless provided a jumping off point for a rich and lively strand of scholarship from subsequent generations of the University of Jena historians. Steinbach's examples include Karl Griewank, Siegfried Schmidt, Werner Greiling and Hans-Werner Hahn. Steinbach believes that Cartellieri's personal perspective combines an underlying commitment to the conservative-monarchist tradition with Rankean methodology and a certain international awareness unusual in second tier historians. Steinbach teamed up with Uwe Dathe to prepare for publication an edited selection of Cartellieri's diary entries covering the period between 1899 and 1953. The result of their work was a stout "critically commentated" volume of 980 pages, published at the end of 2013. The publishers presented Cartellieri's diaries as "representative" testimony, providing an insight into the "Mindset of senior German educators" (... die "Mentalität des deutschen Bildungsbürgertums"). Diary entries covering Cartellieri's time working, between 1892 and 1898, with the State Archives Service in Karlsruhe, had been separately published already, also by Matthias Steinbach, two years earlier.

In 2014 the western journalist-historian Tillmann Bendikowski produced his popular book "Sommer 1914", in which he tried to show, through the eyes of five very different contemporary witnesses, how Germans experienced the outbreak of the First World War. He selected Alexander Cartellieri to represent the nation's "haute-bourgeoisie".
