= Building of the Yugoslavian legation in Berlin =

Historic building in Berlin, Germany

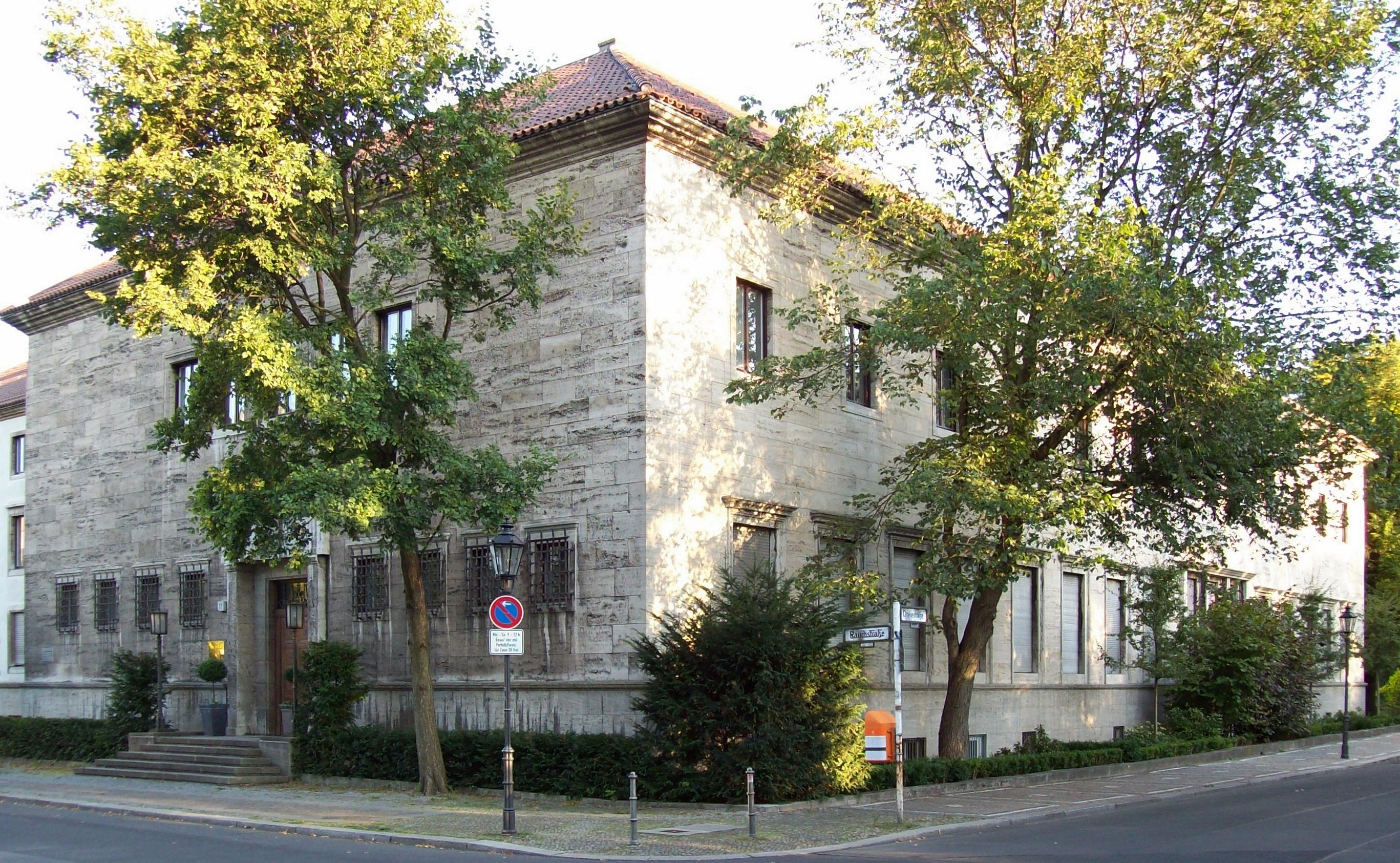
Building of the Yugoslavian legation in Berlin, corner Rauchstraße / Drakestraße, residence wing

The Building of the Yugoslavian Legation in Berlin was constructed from 1938 to 1940 for the diplomatic representation of the Kingdom of Yugoslavia in the German Empire (see legation). The building designed by Werner March is located at Rauchstraße 17–18 in the embassy district of the Tiergarten district and is a listed building.

There were two historical buildings on the site. Villa Kabrun was built in 1865–1867 by the architects Ende & Böckmann on behalf of the manufacturer and manor owner August Kabrun (1807–1877) and his wife Flora Luise Henriette Nicolovius (1811–1879), a grandniece of Johann Wolfgang Goethe. Kabrun's grandson, Ulrich Graf Brockdorff-Rantzau, became the first Foreign Minister of the Weimar Republic. Kabrun's daughters, Cäcilie von Brockdorff and her sister Cornelia von Stralendorff, sold the villa to the merchant Martin Levy, who lived there until 1911. The later banker Arthur Salomonsohn, who was related to Martin Levy through his mother Ernestine Levy, also lived there as a child. The heirs, including the professor of economics Hermann Levy, transferred the property in 1925 to the chemist and industrialist Paul Mendelssohn Bartholdy, who had the Villa Mendelssohn Bartholdy built on it.

In 1938, the Mendelssohn Bartholdy family, which was persecuted as Jewish, was expropriated by the Reich authorities through expropriation and had to emigrate. A new building for the Royal Yugoslavian Legation was erected on the site because Albert Speer's plans for a World Capital Germania at the old seat of the legation included the total demolition in favor of the new headquarters of the High Command of the Army (OKH) at the old headquarters. The Yugoslavian legation moved into the building in October 1940, but only used it for six months. With the Wehrmacht attack on Yugoslavia in April 1941, the Yugoslav state was destroyed and there was no longer any need for a diplomatic mission. After an interim use by Alfred Rosenberg as Reich Minister for the Occupied Eastern Territories, Werner March began converting it into a guest house of the Großdeutsches Reich in 1942. After the end of the Second World War in 1945, the People's Republic of Yugoslavia used the building as the seat of its military mission. In 1953, the Allied Commandant's Office established the Supreme Restitution Court for Berlin (ORG). The ORG was the court of last resort for lawsuits for restitution of assets to racially and politically persecuted persons. The Mendelssohn Bartholdy family also filed an action for Restitution of their assets, including the property of the ORG, which thus had to decide on the rightful owner of the house they had used themselves, and upheld the action. The ORG existed until the end of the Four Power Status through Reunification in 1990. Since 1999, the German Council on Foreign Relations (DGAP) has been using the building.

== History and situation ==
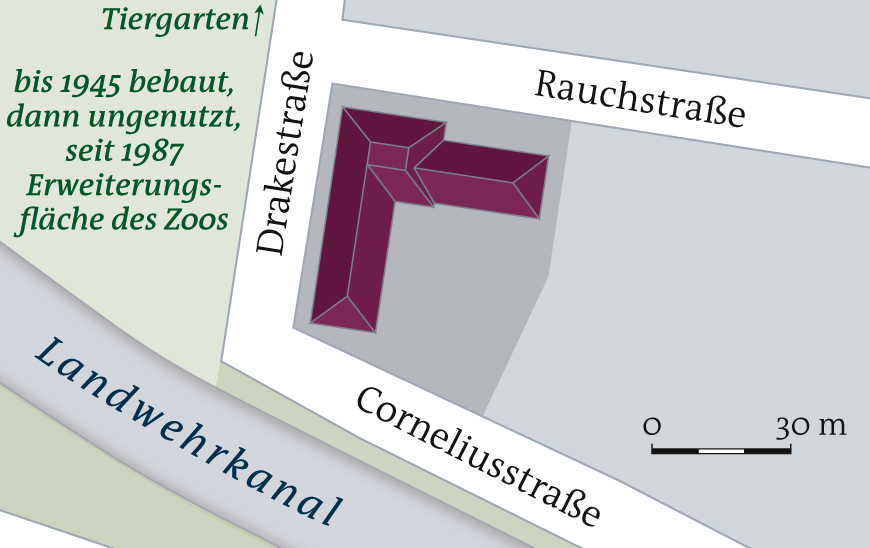
Building (red) and property (dark gray) of the Yugoslavian legation

=== Location ===
The building of the Yugoslavian Legation is located at the western end of Rauchstraße on a slightly trapezoidal corner plot, which is bordered to the north by Rauchstrasse, to the west by Drakestrasse and to the south by Corneliusstrasse. Corneliusstraße is named after the historical painter Peter von Cornelius, Rauchstraße after the sculptor Christian Daniel Rauch and Drakestraße after his pupil Friedrich Drake. The latter created the statue of Victoria on the Siegessäule not far from the property.

=== The villa district in Tiergarten and the Villa Kabrun (1865–1924) ===
The area of today's embassy district lies outside the former Berlin customs and excise wall and was only incorporated into Berlin in 1861. From 1884, the new district bore the name Tiergarten. The property on the north side of the Landwehrgraben (from the opening of the canal in 1850, today's Landwehrkanal) between today's Klingelhöferstraße and Lichtensteinallee was named Albrechtshof after the landowner, a widow Albrecht, from 1835. The northern riverside road along the Landwehr Canal was accordingly called Albrechtshof-Ufer from 1849, before it was given the name Corneliusstraße in 1867, which is still in use today.

=== Villa Mendelssohn Bartholdy (1925–1933) ===
In 1925/26 the 46-year-old Paul Mendelssohn Bartholdy d. J. took over the corner property at Rauchstraße 17 from Levy's heirs, Hermann Levy and his sister Julie Reissert, in Erbpacht. He was the son of the chemist and Agfa founder Paul Mendelssohn Bartholdy and the grandson of the composer Felix Mendelssohn Bartholdy. Like his father, Paul Mendelssohn Bartholdy d. J. had a doctorate in chemistry and was director of Agfa for many years. In 1925, Agfa was merged into I.G. Farben. Together with Camerawerk München and a factory for photographic paper in Leverkusen (both formerly Bayer AG), Agfa formed Division III (Photochemistry) of I. G. Farben, which had its headquarters in Berlin SO 36 (Kreuzberg) and was headed by Mendelssohn Bartholdy as I. G. Farben director. The Berlin address book of 1926 lists building sites at Rauchstraße 17–18. The section of Drakestraße between Corneliusstraße and Rauchstraße (the western boundary of the site of the later legation) did not yet have a house number, but there was also a building site there in 1926. In 1927, Paul Mendelssohn Bartholdy d. J. and his wife Johanna, a British citizen, moved into the newly built Villa Mendelssohn Bartholdy. The couple was still childless at this time. Under the address, next to "Dr. P. Mendelssohn Bartholdy" as the owner and head of the household, only a porter named Zander was registered – as another head of the household and thus possibly living there with his family.

=== Expropriation and emigration (1933–1938) ===
As a prominent member of the Mendelssohn family of Jewish descent, Paul Mendelssohn Bartholdy was persecuted by the National Socialists as a so-called "money Jew". His widely ramified family could be considered a prime example of successful assimilation. Most branches of the family had converted to the Protestant faith by the middle of the 19th century at the latest, were successful, acquired wealth and a high social position. Paul's eldest brother Otto was ennobled in 1907.

In October 1937, Mendelssohn Bartholdy's property was encumbered with a security mortgage in the amount of 60,000 RM from "Reich Flight Tax for the German Reich". The Reich Flight Tax amounted to 25% of the taxable assets and was due upon abandonment of the domestic residence. The family was forced to sell the villa and property in 1938 on the basis of the Reichsgesetz über die Neugestaltung Deutscher Städte.

== Building history and architecture ==
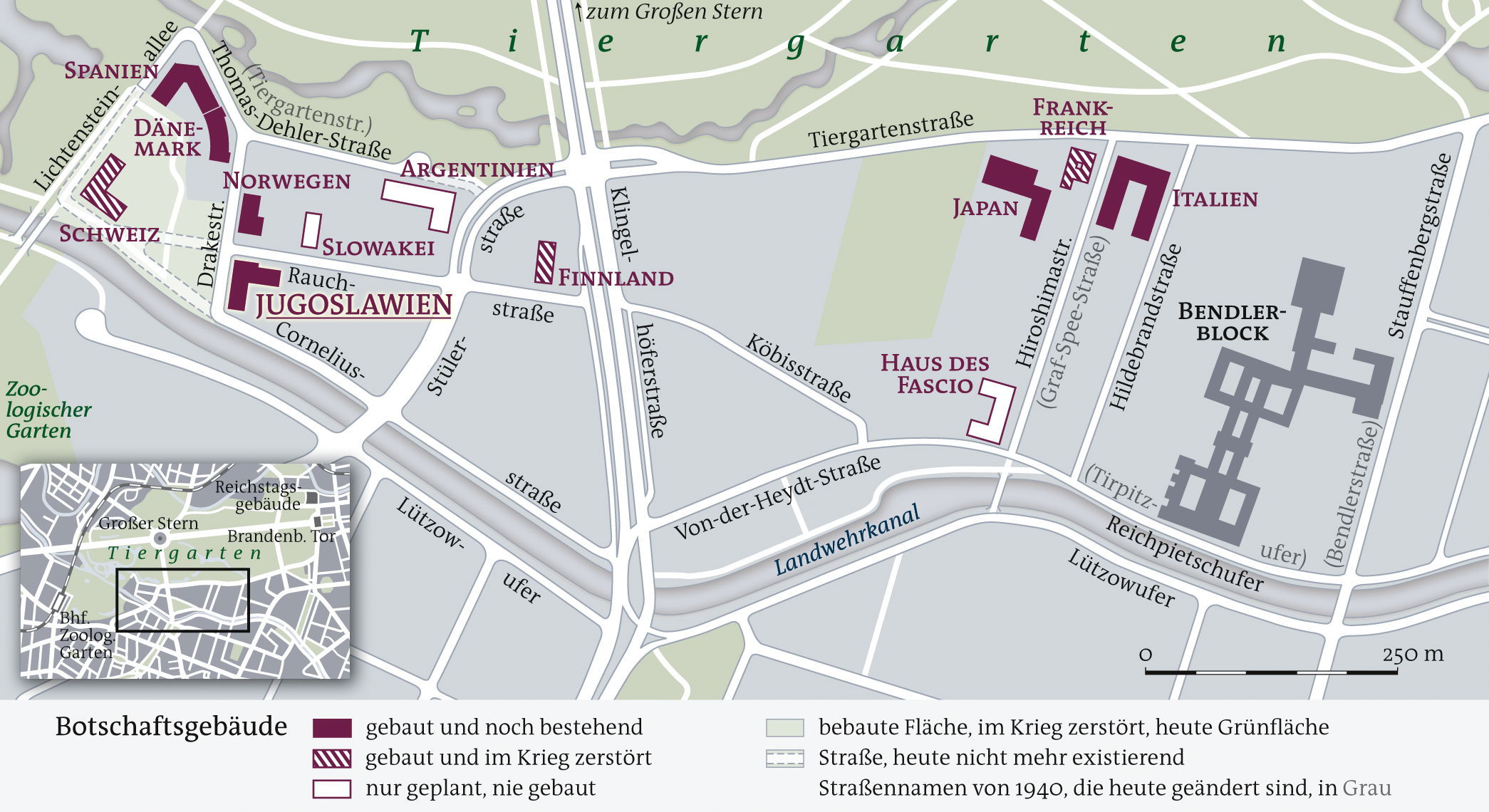
Map of the 12 planned buildings in the embassy district

=== Germania and the embassy district ===
As part of the Development Plan of the National Socialist chief architect Albert Speer as General Building Inspector for the Reich Capital (GBI) for the construction of the world capital Germania The area known today as the Embassy Quarter at the southern Tiergarten was declared a diplomatic quarter. Twelve embassy buildings were to be erected in order to create space in the Government Quarter near the Brandenburg Gate for the implementation of Speer's plans, which were to exceed all previously known urban planning standards. For the realization of his plans, residential buildings in Berlin were demolished in 1938–1939, the tenants to be relocated were given replacement apartments, which became available at Speer's instigation through the eviction and deportation of Jews. In order to make room for the "Royal Yugoslavian Legation", three plots of land were expropriated and merged: Rauchstraße 17 and 18 and Drakestraße 4.

Before the move, the Yugoslavian legation was located together with the legation chancellery at Regentenstraße 17, renamed Großadmiral-Prinz-Heinrich-Straße 17 in 1935, of today's Hitzigallee, at the south-eastern corner with Sigismundstraße about 800 m west of Potsdamer Platzes. This meant that the legation was in the way of the plan for the "North-South Axis", which envisaged a new building for the Army High Command on the western side of the planned 120 m wide boulevard at the intersection with the southern edge of the Tiergarten. (OKH) was planned. The planned two-winged OKH building had a length of about 360 m in the north-south direction and a width of about 280 m in the east-west direction in the last version of the general building inspection from 1942, but was never built. Today, the former site of the Yugoslav Legation is occupied by residential buildings erected before the move as part of the Internationale Bauausstellung 1987.

=== Planning and construction history ===
Werner March, the architect of the legation building, is best known for designing the Berlin Olympiastadion and other buildings within the Reichssportfeld built for the Olympic Summer Games, for whose overall planning he was also responsible. March designed the building in 1938 with an angular ground plan in an austere and closed architectural style, which, however, in comparison to the neoclassicist embassy buildings in the surrounding area (for example the Spanish or Italian Embassy). The building was completed in the years 1938–1940 under the construction management of Willy Kreuer, who was employed in the March office. Construction was originally scheduled to take 8 months, but on 31 August 1939, on the eve of World War II, the GBI canceled all implementation work on the redesign of Berlin. After the Victory over France in the summer of 1940, limited construction work was resumed. On October 7, 1940, the Yugoslavian legation moved into the building, and on November 29, 1940, the official handover and inauguration took place, at which the Foreign Minister Joachim von Ribbentrop was represented by a state secretary.

=== Architecture – exterior design ===
At the north-western corner of the property (intersection of Rauchstrasse and Drakestrasse) is a two-storey head building clad in sharpened Thüringer Travertin clad with Thuringian travertine, in whose center axis the main portal opens onto Rauchstraße. Following the streets, two wings are attached to it, thus forming an L. Together with the travertine-clad section on Drakestrasse, the building is completed to form a two-storey residence wing. In addition to the official reception rooms on the first floor, it contained the representative living quarters for the ambassador on the upper floor. The building front of the residence wing facing Drakestraße is about 47 m wide and thus protrudes at the southern end with a corner by about 4 m over the building line of Corneliusstraße, for which a special permit was granted in 1938. On the inner side of the L, the residence wing opens onto the garden.

The Kanzleitrakt, located on Rauchstraße, is set back 4 m from the building line. This part of the building, which houses the offices for administrative operations, is plastered, with cornices and window reveals being executed in travertine, as in the residence wing. The Kanzleitrakt has lower storey heights than the Residenztrakt, so that it has three storeys with the same eaves height. The plastered façade of the Kanzleitrakt facing Rauchstraße is around 23 m wide; together with the head section of the Residenztrakt, the entire façade facing Rauchstraße is 44 m wide. On the eastern flank of the Kanzleitrakt is a garage for a single car, set back about 3 m from the façade and directly adjacent to the neighboring property. Both the Residenz and Kanzleitrakt have an approximately 1 m high plinth made of carved Kirchheimer Muschelkalk, which is seamless and without Bossen, and ends at the top of the façade with a narrow plinth cornice. The tiled roof is executed in a Mediterranean-style monk-nun roofing.

Above the main portal was a relief by the sculptor Arno Breker with the Yugoslavian coat of arms, which was removed during the conversion of the building. However, the design of the representative balcony in front of the ballroom with another Breker sculpture, which shows a woman's head above the balcony windows, and the wrought-iron balcony balustrade by the sculptor Ludwig Gies have been preserved. Fifteen years later, Gies created the Federal Eagle on the front of the Bundestag, which became the symbol of the Bonn Republic. The recessed part of the chancellery wing contains another entrance, above which there was a "standing stone coat of arms" made of Gauinger travertine by the Yugoslavian artist Vilma Lehrmann, which has not survived. The portal jambs are also made of this natural stone.

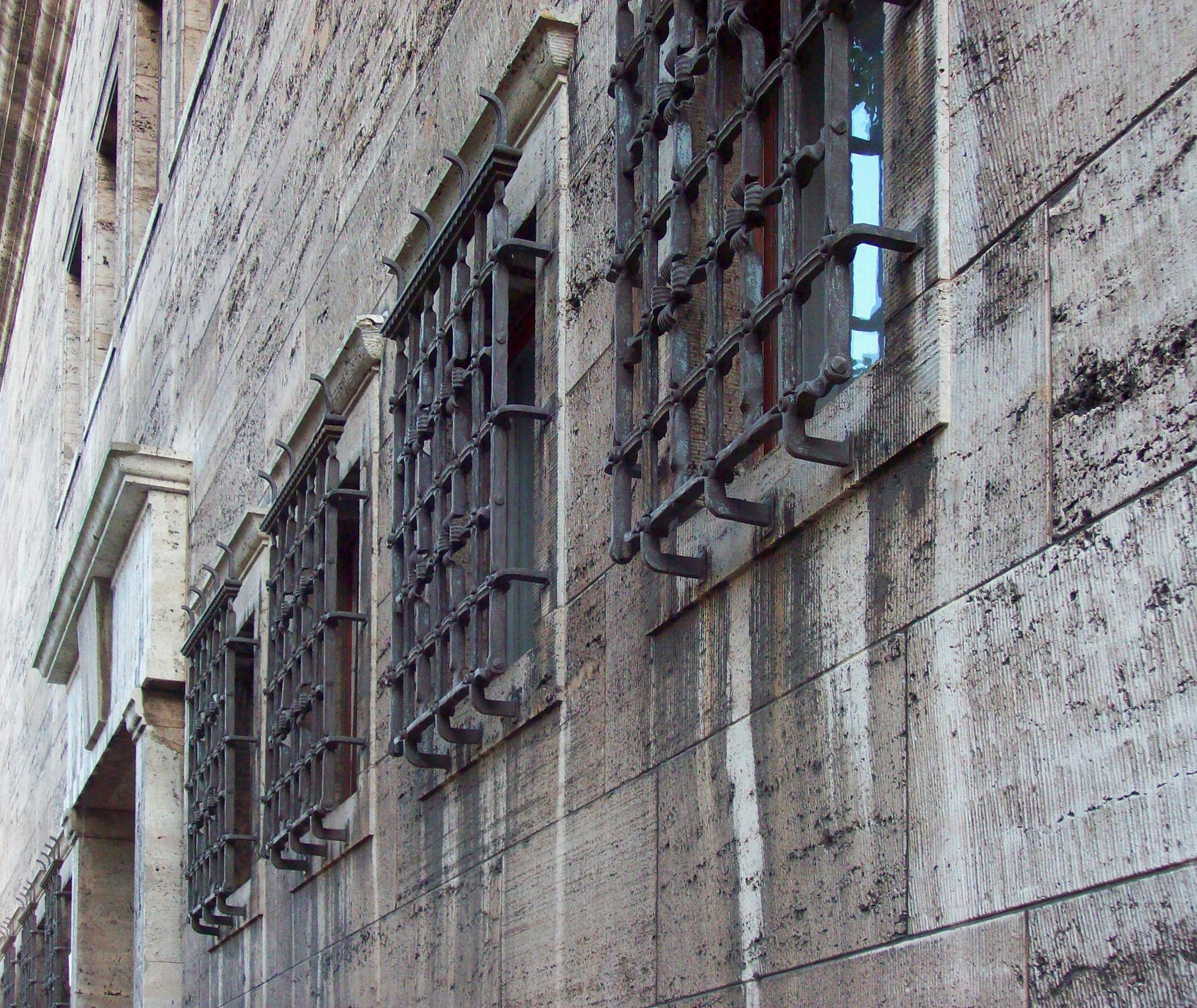
Window reveal and ironwork

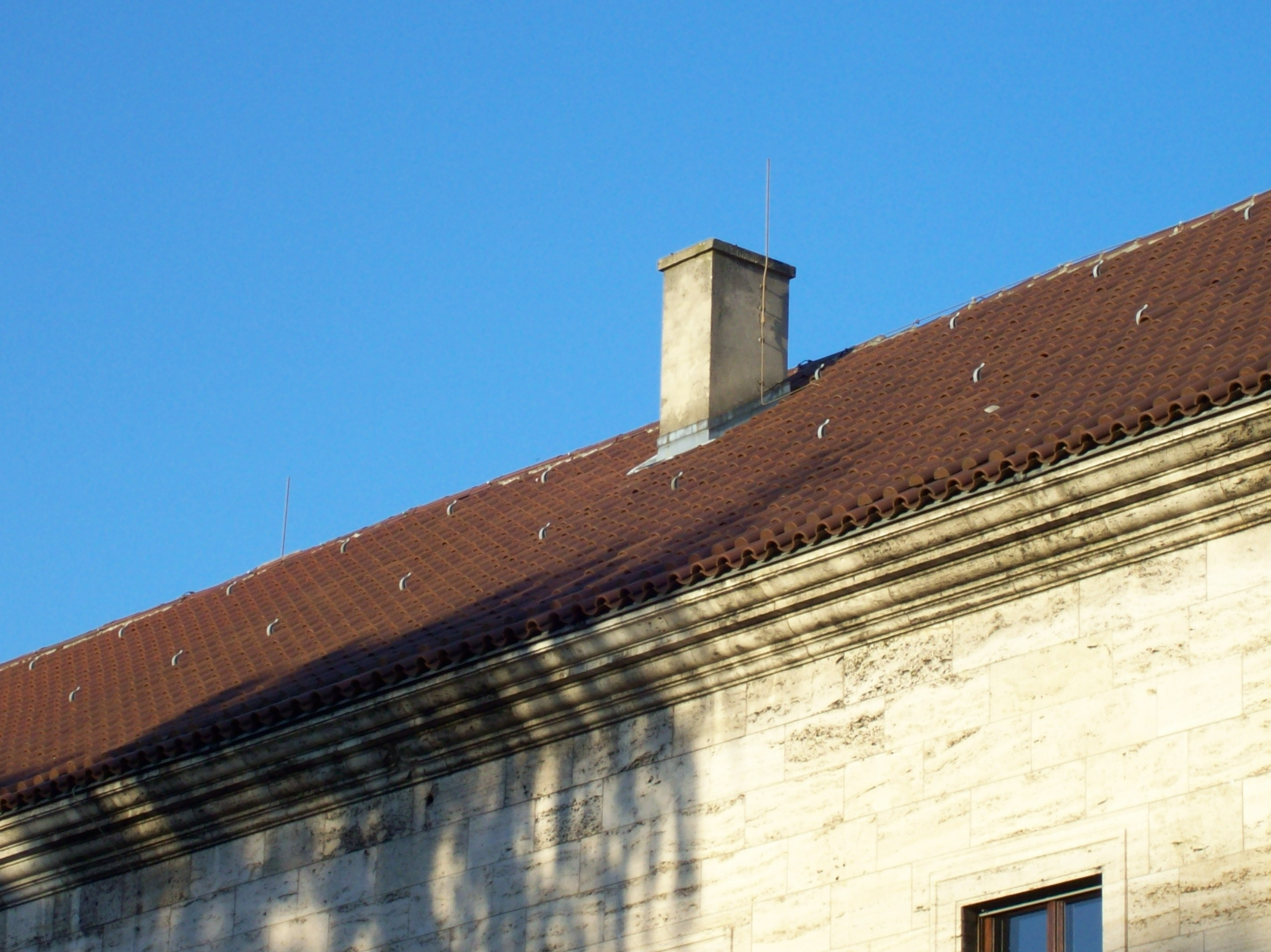
Façade detail on the residence wing

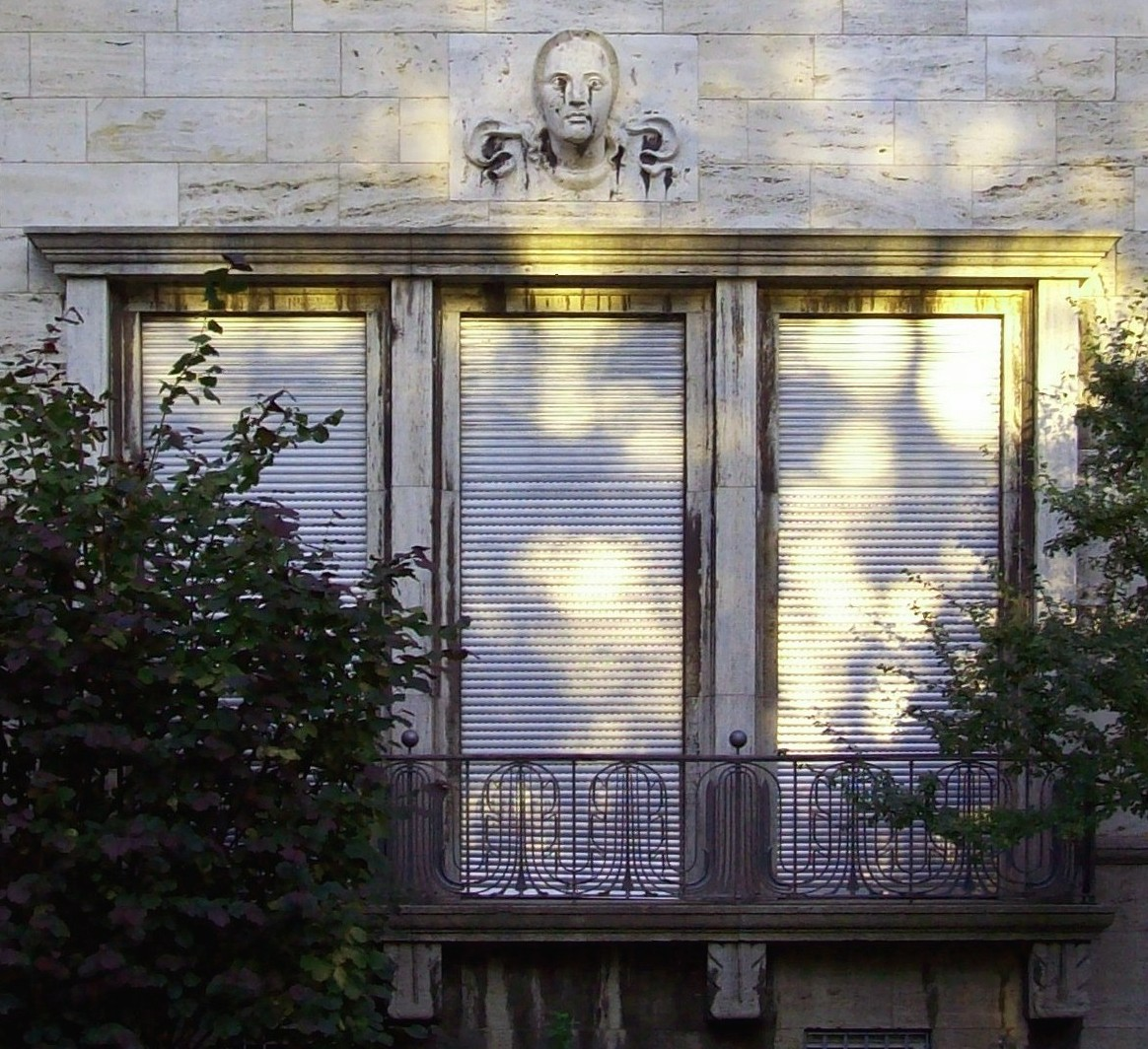
Balcony window of the ballroom

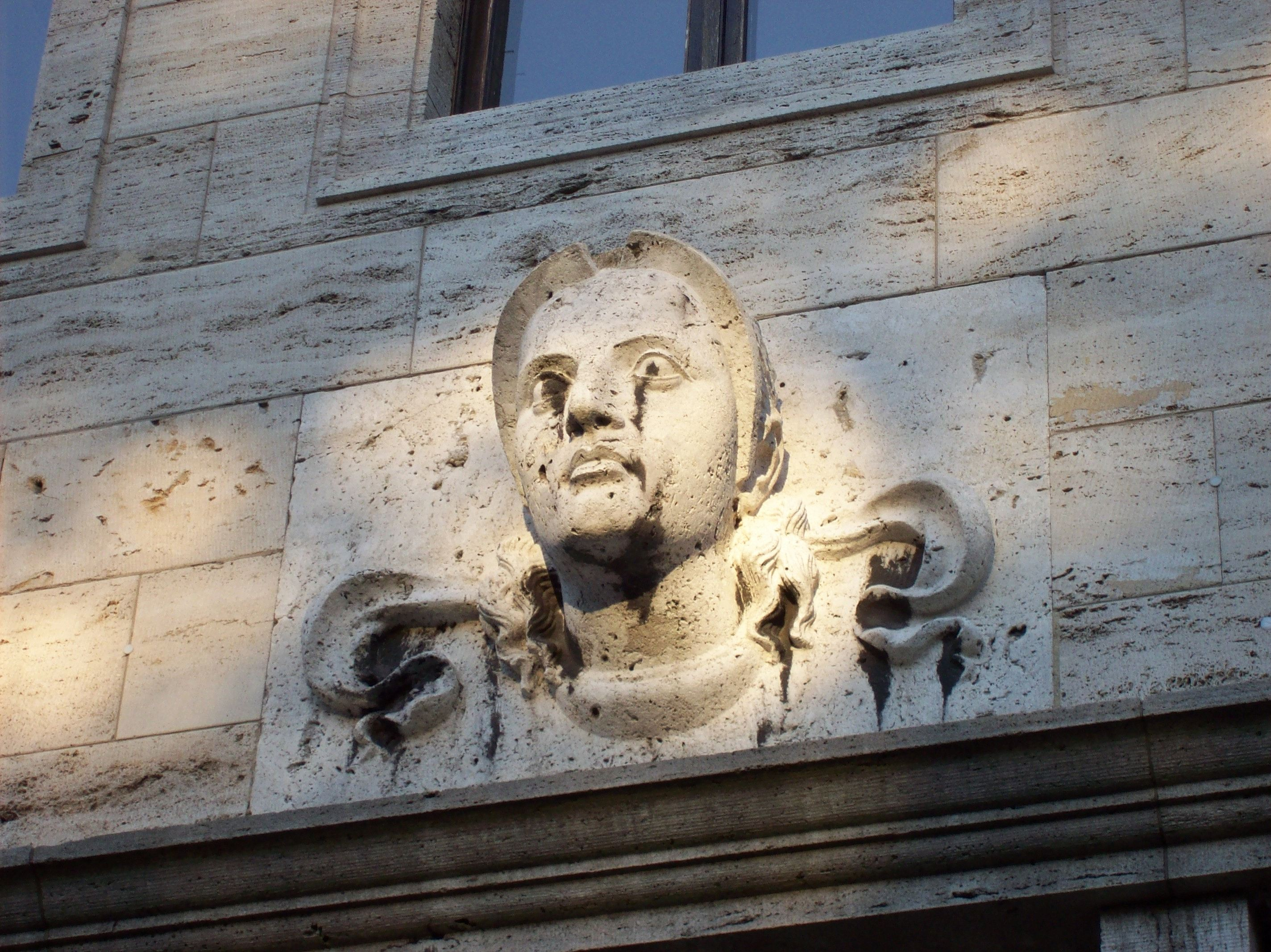
Breker sculpture above balcony windows

The garden behind the two wings of the building extends as far as Corneliusstraße and provides an unobstructed view over the Landwehr Canal. The exterior and gardens around the building were designed in August 1939 by the garden planner Georg Potente in collaboration with the leading architect Werner March and the planning office Kühn & Solbrig (Berlin-Wannsee) and were completed by September 1942. Potente owed his reputation above all to his work as garden inspector of Sanssouci, where he worked from 1902 to 1938. Potente also developed the exterior and gardens for the new Waterway Directorate building in Potsdam (1940–1942), another March design.

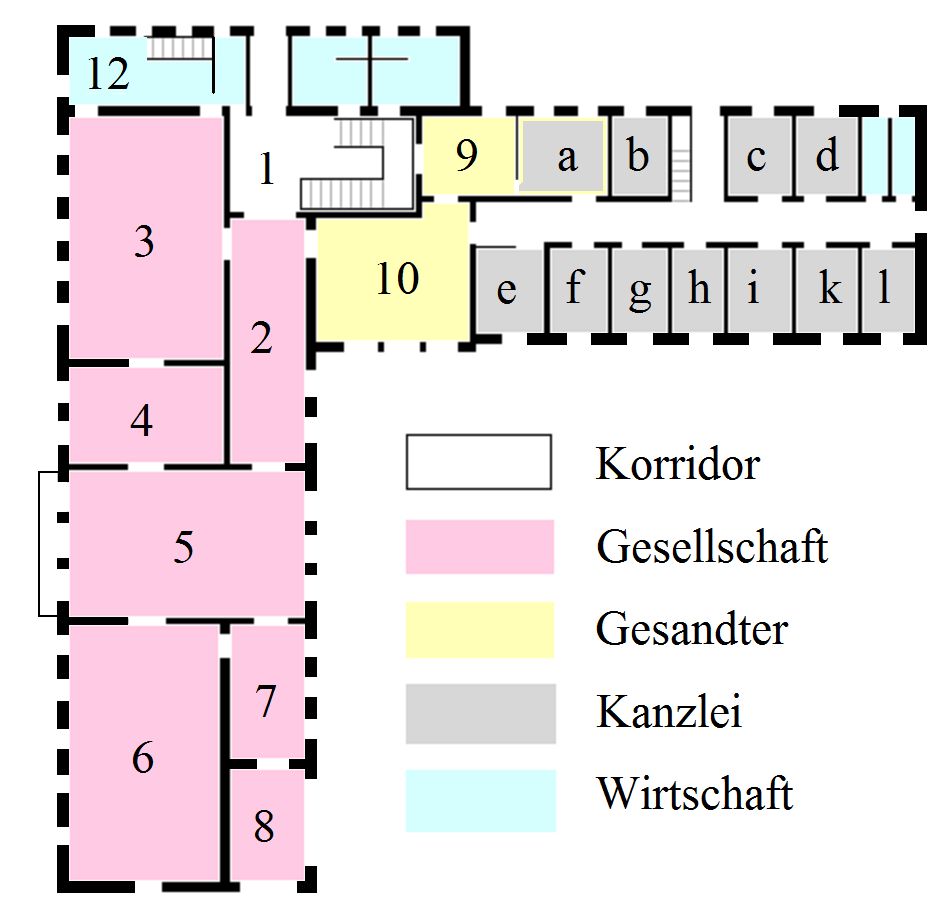
Schematic floor plan of the first floor

== History of use ==
=== First occupancy until the end of the war (1940–1945) ===
In 1940, the Yugoslavian legation, headed by Ivo Andrić, who later won the Nobel Prize for Literature, moved into the new building. Andrić had been in the diplomatic service of the Kingdom of Serbs, Croats and Slovenes (from 1929: Kingdom of Yugoslavia), founded two years earlier, since 1920 and had reached the pinnacle of a remarkable career in 1939: at the beginning of April he was appointed Minister without Portfolio, traveled to Berlin and handed over his diplomatic accreditation on 19 April 1939. On April 19, 1939, he handed over his letter of accreditation to Adolf Hitler. Andrić requested his dismissal as Yugoslavia's ambassador to the German Reich at the beginning of spring 1941, but still attended the signing ceremony of Yugoslavia's forced accession to the Three Power Pact of the Germany-Italy-Japan axis in Vienna on March 25, 1941. Two days later, Yugoslav forces close to the German wartime enemy Great Britain carried out a coup d'état. As a result, the German leadership changed its plans at short notice to enter the war against Greece alongside Italy (Operation Marita)) and expanded the operational plan to include the attack on Yugoslavia. On April 2, 1941, Colonel Vladimir Vauhnik (since 1937 military attaché at the Yugoslav legation in Berlin) warned his superiors in Belgrade of the attack planned for April 6, naming the 32 divisions involved. He is said to have received this information from Colonel Hans Oster of the Defense, who was working for the chief of defense Canaris Canaris, who maintained contact with the national-conservative resistance. On April 6, 1941, the Wehrmacht Yugoslavia without a declaration of war, beginning with the bombing of Belgrade. After April 7, the Germans offered Ambassador Andrić the opportunity to leave for neutral Switzerland while preserving his diplomatic immunity Switzerland. However, at his own request, he withdrew to Belgrade, which was now under German occupation. The military attaché Vauhnik was imprisoned for four months by the Gestapo in violation of his diplomatic immunity.

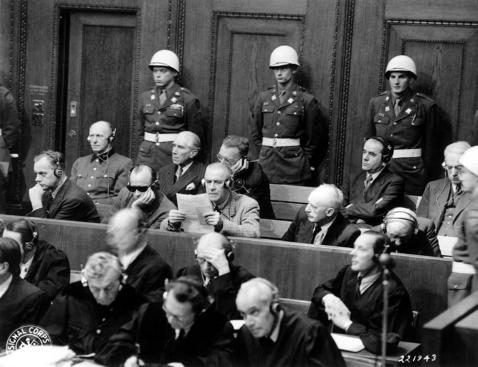
Speer (back right with headphones) and Rosenberg (front left with propped-up chin and without sunglasses) as defendants in the Nuremberg trial

After the unconditional surrender Yugoslavia on April 17, 1941, the state was broken up by annexations by Germany, Italy and Bulgaria; only the fascist Croatia and the Military Administrative Region of Serbia continued to exist as a puppet state. As there was no longer any need for a large diplomatic representation of Yugoslavia in the German Reich, the Reich and Party Offices took over the building. Until 1942, Rauchstraße No. 17–18 was the official residence of Alfred Rosenberg, Nazi chief ideologist and, from July 1941, officially Reich Minister for the Occupied Eastern Territories. From 1942, it was converted into a guest house for the Großdeutsches Reich. Albert Speer, the master builder of the embassy quarter, and Alfred Rosenberg, the first landlord after the evacuation by the Yugoslavian legation, were to meet again after the end of the war as defendants before the Nuremberg Trial of the Major War Criminals. Rosenberg was sentenced to death and executed in 1946, Speer was sentenced to 20 years in prison and released in 1966.

=== The Supreme Restitution Court for Berlin (1953–1990) ===
In 1953, the Allied Commandant's Office established the Supreme Restitution Court for Berlin (ORG), which from then on had its seat in the building of the former Yugoslavian legation. The Allied Commandant's Office was the supreme institution of the Four Victory Powers in Berlin. In 1953, however, only the three powers United States, United Kingdom and France were still members of the Allied Command Authority after the Soviet Union left. The ORG for Berlin was Last Instance for claims for restitution of assets by victims of persecution under the Nazi regime and was opened on October 28, 1953 in the former legation building in the presence of Walther Schreiber, the Regenting Mayor Berlin and the three Western Allied city commanders.

With its appointment of a Swedish national as president and an equal number of Allied and German judges, it is the first of its kind to be established in Germany. Its establishment is the result of the very close and friendly cooperation between the Allied Kommandantura and the German authorities in Berlin.

— Generalmajor C. F. C. Coleman, Rede zur Eröffnung des ORG on October 28, 1953

The former dining room now housed the court's conference room, in which a simultaneous interpreting system was installed, as English and French were permitted as the language of the proceedings in addition to German. The judge's bench was located on the south side of the courtroom, with the Small Salon behind it serving as a consultation room. The large salon and music room were used by the court as offices. The former study of the envoy was now the room of the president of the court.

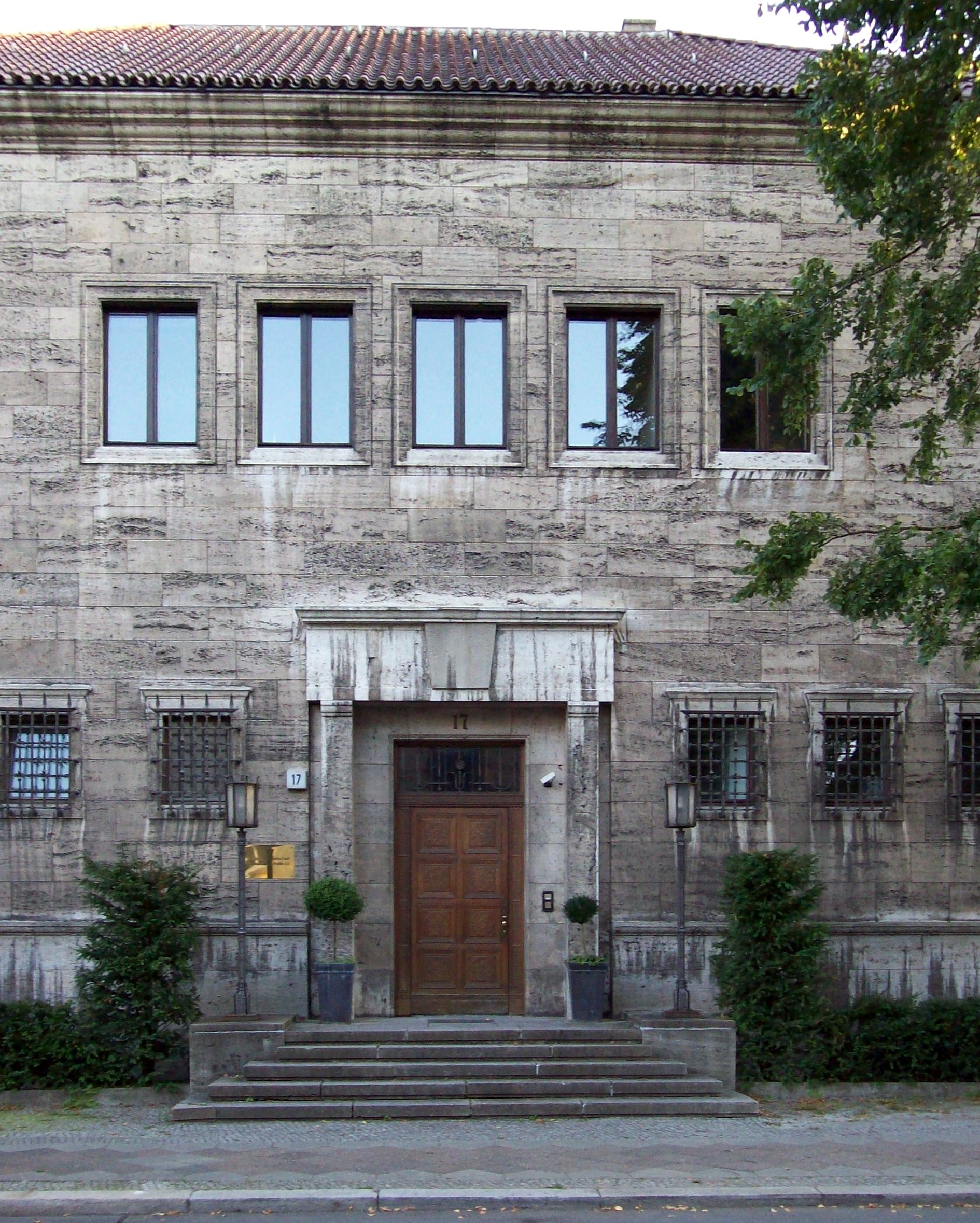
Portal Rauchstraße 17 with main entrance of the DGAP

=== Current use by DGAP (since 1995) ===
The Land Berlin sold the property and building in 1995 to the German Council on Foreign Relations, founded in 1955, which has used it as its headquarters since moving in during 1999. The administration of the DGAP and the editorial office of the journal Internationale Politik (formerly Europa-Archiv). The research institute, library and documentation center of the DGAP are located in the residence wing. The library is open to all interested users. The building also houses conference and seminar rooms as well as an exhibition area in the foyer.

The event rooms on the first floor of the Residence Wing are now named after people from DGAP's history or refer to DGAP sponsors. The only exception is the former dining room, which is named after the resistance fighter Hans von Dohnanyi. Today, the reception hall is named Kurt-Birrenbach Hall after the CDU foreign politician and former president of the DGAP. The music room is also named after a former DGAP president and is now called Baron-Alfred-von-Oppenheim Hall. The Envoy Room is named after Otto Wolff, who headed the Committee on Eastern European Economic Relations for 45 years and was Honorary President of the DGAP. The naming of the gallery "Alfred Herrhausen Hall" is explained more by the Alfred Herrhausen Society's sponsorship of the DGAP than by Herrhausen's role in the DGAP's history; similarly, the Großer Salon is now called the "Robert Bosch Hall" and refers to the DGAP's connection with the Robert Bosch Stiftung.

The DGAG regularly hosts conferences, working meetings and lectures by foreign and security policy experts, diplomats and experts from research and business. The events focus on current topics of German and European foreign policy. Since 2003, these have included Germany's relationship with the countries of Central and Eastern Europe, in particular Poland, as well as on Russia and its neighboring states. The traditional topic of Franco-German relations was also regularly the subject of events. Another central topic was security policy, in particular the threat of terrorism and nuclear proliferation, the new role of NATO and the transformation of the Bundeswehr. Outside Europe, Israel and the Middle East and the transatlantic relationship with the USA.

High-ranking representatives of the respective countries, often the foreign or defense ministers, spoke at many events. Also Federal President Köhler and Federal Chancellor Merkel took part in events or gave keynote speeches. A highlight was the celebration of Hans-Dietrich Genscher's 80th birthday in March 2007, when almost all the foreign ministers involved in the negotiation of the Two Plus Four Treaty came together for a fireside chat in the "Kurt Birrenbach Saal": Shevardnadze (USSR), Dumas (France), Meckel and de Maizière (both GDR), Skubiszewski (Poland) and Service beer (Czechoslovakia).

== Literature ==
The Mendelssohn Bartholdy family, Agfa and Aryanization

- Thomas Lackmann: Das Glück der Mendelssohns. Geschichte einer deutschen Familie. 2. Auflage. Aufbau-Verlag, Berlin 2005, ISBN 3-351-02600-5.
- Arthur Prinz und Avraham Barkai: Juden im deutschen Wirtschaftsleben: Soziale und wirtschaftliche Struktur im Wandel 1850–1914. Mohr Siebeck, Tübingen 1984, ISBN 3-16-744825-3.
- Neil Rosenstein: The Unbroken Chain: Biographical Sketches and Genealogy of Illustrious Jewish Families from the 15th–20th Century. 2. Ausgabe. Computer Center for Jewish Genealogy, New York 1990, ISBN 0-9610578-4-X.

World capital Germania, Albert Speer and the embassy district

- Susanne Willems: Der entsiedelte Jude – Albert Speers Wohnungsmarktpolitik für den Berliner Hauptstadtbau. Edition Hentrich, Berlin 2002, ISBN 3-89468-259-0.
- Alexander Kropp: Die politische Bedeutung der NS-Repräsentationsarchitektur – die Neugestaltungspläne Albert Speers für den Umbau Berlins zur „Welthauptstadt Germania“ 1936–1942/43. Ars Una, Neuried 2005, ISBN 3-89391-135-9.
- Hans J. Reichhardt, Wolfgang Schäche: Von Berlin nach Germania: über die Zerstörungen der Reichshauptstadt durch Albert Speers Neugestaltungsplanungen. Katalog zu einer Ausstellung des Landesarchivs Berlin, 7. November 1984 bis 30. April 1985. Landesarchiv, Berlin 1985.
- Wolfgang Schäche: Architektur und Städtebau in Berlin zwischen 1933 und 1945 – Planen und Bauen unter der Ägide der Stadtverwaltung. Gebrüder Mann, Berlin 1992, ISBN 3-7861-1178-2.
- Wolfgang Schäche: Fremde Botschaften. Transit Buchverlag, Berlin 1984, ISBN 3-88747-022-2. (2 Bände erschienen zur Bauausstellung Berlin. Band 1: Das Gebäude der ehemaligen Italienischen Botschaft in Berlin-Tiergarten. Band 2: Das Gebäude der ehemaligen Japanischen Botschaft in Berlin-Tiergarten. Beide Bände sind zweisprachig und enthalten einen allgemeinen Teil, der sich mit den Germania-Planungen und dem Botschaftsviertel befasst. Text und Abbildungen dieses allgemeinen Teils ist bei beiden Bänden bis auf die Sprache der Übersetzung – italienisch bzw. englisch – identisch.)

Nazi architecture, Werner March and the legation building

- Matthias Donath: Architektur in Berlin 1933–1945. herausgegeben vom Landesdenkmalamt Berlin. Lukas Verlag, Berlin 2007, ISBN 3-936872-26-0.
- Sabine Konopka: Wohnen am Tiergarten – die Bauten an der Rauchstrasse. Herausgegeben von Groth + Graalfs im Rahmen der Internationalen Bauausstellung Berlin 1987. Konopka, Berlin 1985, ISBN 3-924812-08-X.
- Wolfgang Schäche: Das „Diplomatenviertel“ in Berlin-Tiergarten. Gutachten für das Landesdenkmalamt, Berlin 1985. (Zur Feststellung des Status als denkmalgeschütztes Gebäude.)
- Thomas Schmidt: Werner March, Architekt des Olympia-Stadions: 1894–1976. Birkhäuser Verlag, Basel, Berlin, Boston 1992, ISBN 3-7643-2455-4.
- Jakob Straub (Fotografie) und Andreas Fecht (Text): Schatten der Macht – Architektur des Nationalsozialismus in Berlin. Jovis, Berlin 2006, ISBN 3-936314-64-0.
- Jürgen Tomisch: Denkmale in Berlin – Bezirk Mitte – Ortsteile Moabit, Hansaviertel und Tiergarten. Michael Imhof Verlag, Petersberg 2005, ISBN 3-86568-035-6. (Erschienen in der Reihe Denkmaltopographie Bundesrepublik Deutschland.)
- Erich Voß: Neue Gesandtschaftsbauten in Berlin. In: Die Kunst im Deutschen Reich. Teil B: Die Baukunst. Vol. 4, 1940.
- Helmut Weihsmann: Bauen unterm Hakenkreuz – Architektur des Untergangs. Promedia, Wien 1998, ISBN 3-85371-113-8.

Use during the Second World War: Yugoslavian legation, Eastern Ministry, guest house

- Radovan Popovic: Ivo Andrić – sein Leben. Aus dem Serbokroatischen übersetzt von Brigitte Simić. Zadužbina Ive Andrića, Belgrad 1988.
- Vladimir Vauhnik: Memoiren eines Militärattachés – Ein Kampf gegen das Fingerspitzengefühl Hitlers. Edicion Palabra eslovena, Buenos Aires 1967.
- Christine Blum-Minkel: Alfred Rosenberg als Reichsminister für die besetzten Ostgebiete. Universität Hamburg, 1995. (Magisterarbeit, Zentralbibliothek Philosophie, Geschichte und Klassische Philologie der Staats- und Universitätsbibliothek Hamburg)
- Ernst Piper: Alfred Rosenberg – Hitlers Chefideologe. Pantheon, München 2007, ISBN 3-570-55021-4.
- Alfred Rosenberg: Letzte Aufzeichnungen – Nürnberg 1945/46. Jomsburg-Verlag, Uelzen 1996, ISBN 3-931637-01-8.

Post-war use: military mission, ORG, DGAP

- Volker Kähne: Gerichtsgebäude in Berlin – eine rechts- und baugeschichtliche Betrachtung. Haude & Spener, Berlin 1988, ISBN 3-7759-0318-6.
- Friedrich Scholz: Berlin und seine Justiz. Walter de Gruyter, 1982, ISBN 3-11-008679-4.
- Jahresbericht der Deutschen Gesellschaft für Auswärtige Politik e. V. Deutsche Gesellschaft für Auswärtige Politik, Berlin 1999, ISSN 0177-9826.
