= German Council on Foreign Relations =

Germany foreign policy research institute

Coordinates: 52.5087°N 13.3463°E

- Deutsche Gesellschaft für Auswärtige Politik

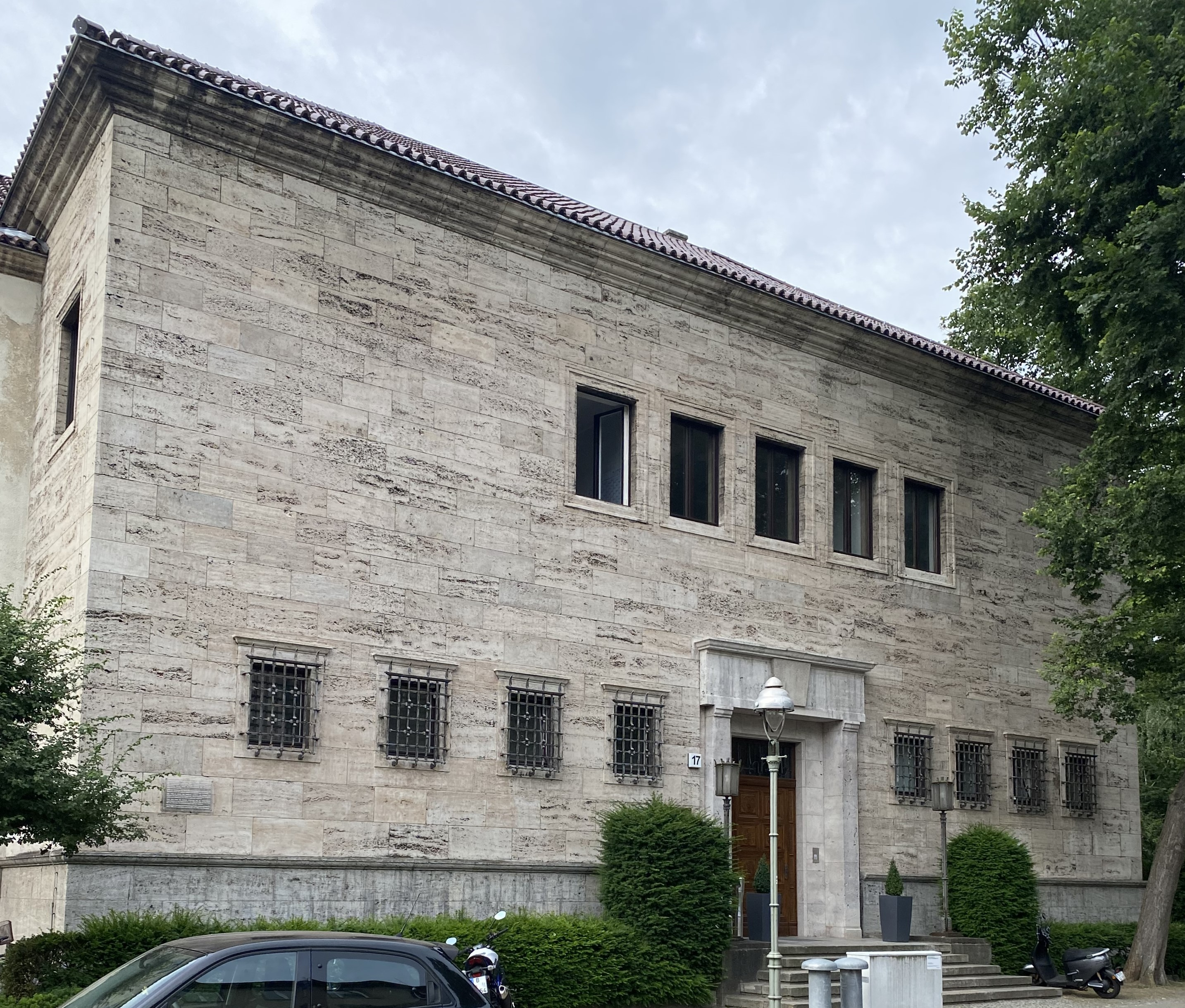
- Main office of DGAP in Berlin
- Abbreviation: DGAP
- Formation: 1955
- Founder: Hermann Josef Abs; Robert Pferdmenges
- Type: Think tank
- Legal status: Active
- Headquarters: Berlin
- Fields: Foreign policy Security policy Geoeconomics
- Members: 2,500+
- Official language: German
- President: Tom Enders
- Director and CEO: Thomas Kleine-Brockhoff
- Website: dgap.org

The German Council on Foreign Relations (German: Deutsche Gesellschaft für Auswärtige Politik, DGAP) is a prominent Germany foreign policy research institute. It is an independent, private, non-partisan and non-profit organisation, and actively takes part in policy formation and promoting the understanding of German foreign policy and international relations. It was established in 1955 in Bonn as a registered association, and relocated to Berlin in 1999.

== History ==
The model for the DGAP's foundation in 1955 was in many respects the Council on Foreign Relations in New York and the Chatham House in London. The first president of the newly founded DGAP was the CDU politician, diplomat and entrepreneur Günther Henle.

Prominent former and current members include former German foreign minister Hans-Dietrich Genscher, former German President Richard von Weizsäcker, as well as Eberhard Diepgen, Klaus von Dohnanyi, Michael Glos, Friedbert Pflüger, Volker Rühe, Rudolf Scharping, Dieter Schulte, Manfred Stolpe, Rita Süssmuth, Günter Verheugen, Antje Vollmer, and Theodor Waigel.

In 2019, Microsoft announced that it had detected cyberattacks, which occurred between September and December 2018, targeting employees of the DGAP; they are believed to have originated from a group called Strontium.

In the spring of 2025, DGAP was declared an undesirable organization in Russia.

== Operations ==
Internationally known as the "German Council on Foreign Relations", the DGAP sees itself as a practical think tank offering demand-driven policy advice on a scientific basis. It works to actively influence the foreign policy opinion-forming at all levels. Its work is aimed at decision-makers in German politics, business, public administration, in NGOs, in the military and to the general public. DGAP publishes the bimonthly journal Internationale Politik. Also, it is among other organisers of the EU-Russia Forum.

The Council provides:

- A platform for discussions at conferences and in study group meetings as well as at public events.
- Policy oriented analyses from research institute fellows.
- Authoritative publications on contemporary topics by its journal Internationale Politik, the Jahrbuch Internationale Politik as well as in the publications from the research institute.
- Expert and extensive documentation by its library and documentation section.

High-level guest speakers have in recent years included Angela Merkel (2006), Christine Lagarde (2012), Ali Akbar Salehi (2013), Recep Tayyip Erdoğan (2014), Mohammad Javad Zarif (2015), Paolo Gentiloni (2015), Volodymyr Groysman (2018), Nikos Kotzias (2018) and Nirmala Sitharaman (2019).

The DGAP is a member of the European Movement Germany.

DGAP is financed through the contributions of its members, acquired project funds and contributions from sponsors and patrons, including among others, the Federal Foreign Office, Deutsche Bank, Airbus, the Robert Bosch Foundation, and the Open Society Foundations.

== Building ==
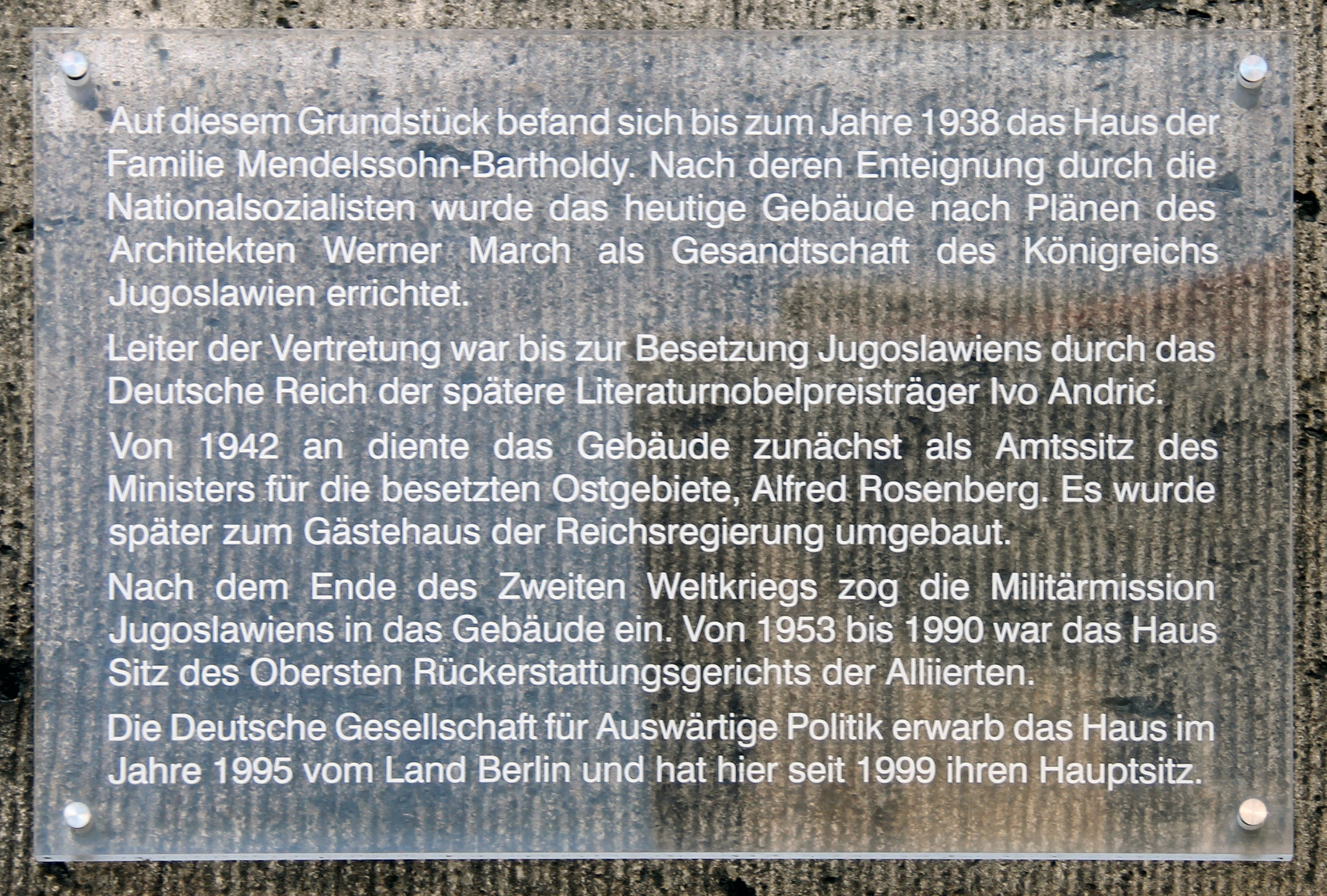
Historical plaque on the DGAP building, Rauchstrasse 17 in Berlin

In Bonn, the DGAP was seated in the villa at Joachimstraße 7 between 1956 and 1959 and then in the Villa Schaumburg-Lippe-Straße 6 between 1965 and 1966. In 1965 it acquired the former House of Craftsmen at Adenauerallee 131a in Bonn, including the Villa Adenauerallee 131, which in later years served as a logo of DGAP, for the first time its own building. It served as headquarters of the DGAP from April 1966 to 1999.

Since 1999, the DGAP has used at its seat the building designed by Werner March, that was erected in 1938 to house the Yugoslav embassy in Berlin, and went through various other uses from 1941 to 1995 when it was sold to DGAP by the Land of Berlin. It is located in the embassy district of Berlin-Tiergarten.

== Leadership ==
=== Presidents ===
- 1955-1973 – Günter Henle
- 1973-1981 – Kurt Birrenbach
- 1981-1987 - Günter Diehl
- 1987-1993 – C. Peter Henle
- 1993-1999 – Werner Lamby
- 1999-2001 – Ulrich Cartellieri
- 2001-2003 – Hans-Dietrich Genscher
- 2003-2005 – Alfred Freiherr von Oppenheim
- 2005-2019 – Arend Oetker
- 2019–present – Tom Enders

=== Directors ===
- 1955-1958 - Arnold Bergstraesser
- 1958-1961 - Ulrich Gembardt
- 1961-1964 - Hans-Adolf Jacobsen
- 1965-1966 - Wilhelm Cornides
- 1967-1970 - Wolfgang Wagner
- 1970-1972 - Karl Carstens
- 1973-2003 - Karl Kaiser
- 2003-2016 - Eberhard Sandschneider
- 2017-2021 - Daniela Schwarzer
- 2021-2022 - Cathryn Clüver Ashbrook
- 2022-2024 - Guntram Wolff
- 2024-present - Thomas Kleine-Brockhoff

== See also ==
- German Institute for International and Security Affairs
- Institut français des relations internationales
- Chatham House
