= Georg Decker (printer) =

German printer (1596–1661)

Georg Decker (23 April 1596 – 1661) was a German book-printer and publisher active in Basel, where he founded Basel University Press. He was the founder of a printing dynasty. He was born in Eisfeld, then in the Electorate of Saxony, and died in the Alte Eidgenossenschaft of Basel.

== Life ==
His parents were Kilian Decker and Anna Göring, who lived in Eisfeld. Decker learned the printing trade in Bamberg or Hildburghausen and on 13 October 1624 he appeared in the Tübingen trade directory as a journeyman printer. After other jobs, the tumult of the Thirty Years' War forced him to take refuge in Basel, where in 1635 he married the widow Margarete Zäsinger - her first husband Johannes Schröter, another printer, had died in September 1634. Decker was made a citizen of Basel on 8 June 1635 and took over Schröter's presses in the Truckerstuben zum Feigenbaum, which then remained in operation until 1745.

On 2 July 1635 Decker was made 'Academiae Typographus' or official printer to the University of Basel, founding the University's publishing house, which his family ran until 1802. He published texts in German, Hebrew, Latin and ancient Greek, including works by Johann Buxtorf the Elder and Johann Buxtorf the Younger.

Decker had three daughters and one son, Johann Jakob Decker (1635–1697), who worked as his father's partner until 1661, when he took over the presses after Georg's death. One of Georg Decker's descendants, Georg Jacob Decker (1732–1799), later took over a printing press in Berlin.

== Bibliography (in German) ==
- Ernst Kelchner (1877). "Decker". Allgemeine Deutsche Biographie (in German). Vol. 5. Leipzig: Duncker & Humblot. pp. 4–8.
- Karl H. Salzmann (1957). "Decker, Georg Jakob". Neue Deutsche Biographie (in German). Vol. 3. Berlin: Duncker & Humblot. pp. 547–548. (full text online).
- Peter Tschudin: Decker in German, French and Italian in the online Historical Dictionary of Switzerland.
- Georg Decker. In: August Potthast: Die Abstammung der Familie Decker. Rudolf Ludwig Decker, Berlin 1863, S. 11.
- Fritz Lendenmann: Deckersche kleine Verlagsgeschichte. Verlag Decker, Heidelberg 1988, ISBN 3-7685-0888-9.
- Literature by and about Georg Decker in the German National Library catalogue
- Books relating to him in the catalogue of the Staatsbibliothek zu Berlin
