= Robert Holtzmann =

German Medievalist historian (1873–1946)

Robert Holtzmann (17 October 1873 – 27 June 1946) was a German Medievalist historian. He was something of a pioneer for what became an important post-war historiographical approach, respected among historians, in particular, as an authority on the Ottonians and their times, both during his life and for many years following his death.

== Life ==
=== Provenance and early years ===
Robert Holtzmann, the third of his parents’ four recorded children, was born in Heidelberg. His father, Prof. Heinrich Holtzmann, was a Protestant theologian, regarded by some among his colleagues something of a liberal. His mother, born Karoline Weber (1840–1897) was a daughter of Georg Weber (1808–1888), another historian. Of Robert Holtzmann's three siblings, two achieved significant notability on their own account. His elder sister, generally identified in sources by her married name, as Adelheid Steinmann (1866–1925) was a politically engaged women's rights activist and an effective advocate of equal education opportunities for women. His younger brother, Friedrich Holtzmann (1876–1948), became a noted physician and expert on hygiene.

Holtzmann's father taught at the university of Straßburg between 1874 and 1904, and it was in Strasbourg – between 1871 and 1918 a German city – that the boy grew up and received his schooling. On leaving school in 1892 he served his military service as a “one-year volunteer” in a recently formed infantry regiment. He then moved on to study for a first degree in History at the universities of Straßburg and (more briefly) Berlin. His most influential university teachers during this period were Paul Scheffer-Boichorst and Harry Bresslau. He went on to receive his doctorate in 1897 his doctoral dissertation, adapted for publication as a 294-page book in 1898 and most recently republished in 2016, concerned the French statesman Guillaume de Nogaret (1260–1313), councillor and keeper of the Great Seal to the king Philippe le Bel. It was also in 1897 that he was recruited by Paul Scheffer-Boichorst to join the team working on the great “Monumenta Germaniae Historica” project.

=== Habilitation ===
In 1902 Holtzmann received his post-doctoral Habilitation degree from the University of Straßburg, His degree project this time concerned the first part of the life of the man who became the Holy Roman Emperor Maximillian II, covering the years between 1527 and 1564. The Habilitation degree normally opened the way to a life-long teaching career in the universities sector, and he remained at the university as a ”Privatdozent” (‘’loosely, “tutor”’’). In 1907 he accepted a junior professorship.

=== Gießen ===
He accepted an ordinary (i.e. full) professorship with a teaching chair in Medieval History at the University of Gießen in 1913 in succession to Johannes Haller who had accepted an appointment at Tübingen. War broke out at the end of July 1914, however. Between 1914 and 1916 Holtzmann served on the western front. Serious injuries in the bitter fighting round Verdun put an end to his fighting career and he was released from further military service. His valour was recognised with the award of the Iron Cross 1st class and the Knight Cross 2nd class of the Order of the Zähringer Lion.

=== Breslau ===
After a period of recovery, by the end of 1916 Holtzmann joined the staff as a Professor of History at the University of Breslau (as Wrocław was known before the ethnic cleansing of 1944/45). In 1917 he was the source of one of two nominations submitted to the Nobel Committee on behalf of the emperor for a Peace Prize. (The German emperor's other Peace Prize nomination that year came from the Faculty of law at the Ottoman University of Istanbul)

=== Halle and Berlin ===
Seven years later he moved on again, this time to Halle, where he taught history till 1930. For the final part of his career, between 1930 and his retirement in 1939, he was employed as an ordinary (i.e. full) professor at the Friedrich Wilhelm University (as the “Humboldt” was known before 1945) in Berlin. After the war ended in May 1945 there was a desperate shortage of university professors acceptable to the country's newly installed military administrators and he prepared to return to work, but instead he fell ill and, following a short illness, died at Halle (in the Soviet zone) on 27 June 1946.

The Historical Commission for Silesia was created at Breslau in 1921 with backing from at the university and the City State Archive. Holtzmann was appointed as its first chairman, serving until the position passed to his fellow commission member, Konrad Wutke. Later during that decade, between 1928 and 1930, Holtzmann chaired the “Deutscher Historikerverband“ ([nationwide] "German Historians' Association").

== Works ==
Holtzmann's principal research focuses included the relations between the German medieval state and the surrounding territories, Franco-German relations during the later Middle Ages as France began to develop towards a more centralised power structure, the ”Ostsiedlung” (west-east colonisation of central Europe in the medieval centuries) and historical sources for the Ottonian period. In 1930 Holtzmann produced a new edition – the seventh edition – of Gebhardt's Handbook of German History. In 1935, under the auspices of the “Monumenta Germaniae Historica” project, he produced a new edition of “Die Chronik des Bischofs Thietmar von Merseburg und ihre Korveier Überarbeitung” ("Thietmari Merseburgensis episcopi Chronicon"), originally authored by the tenth/eleventh century Prince-Bishop Thietmar of Merseburg, recognized then and now as a key source for teachers and students of the Ottonians. In 1938 he took over as series editor for what was still known as Wattenbach's “Deutschlands Geschichtsquellen im Mittelalter bis zur Mitte des XIII Jahrhunderts”, a directory produced of sources for Medieval German History intended for historians at all levels of scholarship Holtzmann's best known work today is probably his “Geschichte der sächsischen Kaiserzeit 900–1024”, first published in 1941 and still a standard work on the Ottonians three decades later. The sixth edition appeared in 1979 and was reprinted in 1989.

== Recognition ==
In 1943 Holtzmann was a recipient of the government's Goethe Medal. During the Summer of 1944 he was accepted an honorary doctorate from the Theology Faculty at the University of Halle.
