= Charles Petit-Dutaillis =

French medieval historian

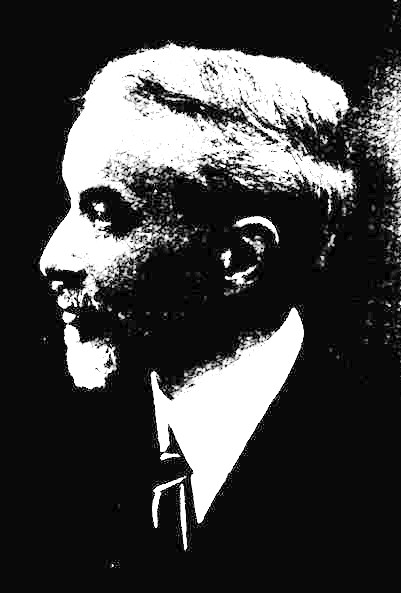

Charles Petit-Dutaillis (26 January 1868 – 10 July 1947) was a French medieval historian specializing in the history of the Middle Ages in France and England.

== Publications ==
- Études sur la vie et le règne de Louis VIII, Paris, 1894. Bibliothèque de l'École des Hautes-Études, n° 101.
- Le soulèvement des travailleurs d’Angleterre en 1381, 1898.
- « Charles VII, Louis XI et les premières années de Charles VIII (1422-1492) », in Histoire de France, de Ernest Lavisse, Paris, Hachette, 1902.
- Documents nouveaux sur les mœurs populaires et le droit de vengeance dans les Pays-Bas au XVe s., 1908.
- Le déshéritement de Jean sans Terre et le meurtre d'Arthur de Bretagne, Paris, F. Alcan, 1925.
- La monarchie féodale en France et en Angleterre, x^{e} – xiii^{e} siècle, Paris, la Renaissance du livre, 1933 / The Feudal Monarchy in France and England (Harper & Brothers Publishers, 1936; Routledge, 2014).
- « L'essor des États d'Occident : France, Angleterre, Péninsule ibérique », in Histoire du Moyen Âge, sous la direction de Gustave Glotz, Paris, PUF, 1937.
- Les Communes françaises, caractères et évolution des origines au xviii^{e} siècle, Paris, Albin Michel, 1947.
