= Regesta =

Copies of papal letters and official documents kept in the papal archives

Papal regesta are the copies, generally entered in special registry volumes, of the papal letters and official documents that are kept in the papal archives. The name is also used to indicate subsequent publications containing such documents, in chronological order, with summaries of their essential contents, for which the science of diplomatics – when written in English – usually uses the term "calendar".

== Early history ==
The growth of the correspondence of the Holy See is evident even by the end of the 2nd century. Probably from a very early date a copy was made of papal documents before their dispatch, and that the collection of these documents was preserved at the seat of the central administration of the Roman Church. At that time high officials of the Roman State administration, the imperial chancery, the Senate, the consuls, the provincial governments, had all official documents entered in such volumes and preserved in the archives. The books in which these documents were entered were called commentarii regesta, the latter word from regerere, to inscribe.

The existence of such papal regesta can be proved for the 4th century and the succeeding era. In his polemic with Rufinus ("Apolog. adv. Rufinum", III, xx), St. Jerome refers to the archives (chartarium) of the Roman Church, where the letter of Pope Anastasius (399-401) on the controversy over the doctrines of Origen was preserved. There are also notices concerning the registration of papal letters in the documents of several popes of the 5th century. Thus Pope Zosimus in his letter of 22 Sept., 417, to the bishops of Africa refers to the fact that all the earlier negotiations with Coelestius had been examined at Rome (Coustant, "Epist. Rom. Pontif.", 955). Consequently, copies of the documents in question must have existed. From this time onwards it remained the fixed custom of the papal chancery to copy the official papers issued by it in registers.

== Surviving regesta ==
From the centuries previous to the pontificate of Innocent III (1199–1216) there remain only fragments of the registry volumes of the papal chancery and these in large part merely in later copies. Nearly all the volumes of the papal regesta up to the end of the 12th century have disappeared.

The most important fragments of this period that have been preserved are: nearly 850 letters, in three groups, of the Regesta of Pope Gregory I (590-604). An investigation proved that the original Regesta consisted of fourteen papyrus volumes, corresponding to the number of years of the pontificate, which were arranged according to indictions; that each of these volumes was divided into twelve parts, before each of which the name of the corresponding month was written. This indicates the plan of the earliest volumes of the papal Regesta. A manuscript of the Vatican archives contains letters of John VIII (872-882) from September 876 to the end of the pontificate. This is not an original register, but an 11th-century copy. Separate letters, fifty-five in number, belonging to the first four years of the pontificate of this pope, are in a manuscript of the 12th century in the British Museum (Ms. Add. 8873). The manuscript contains letters of Gelasius I (492-96), Pelagius I (556-561), Leo IV (847-55), John VIII (872-82), Stephen V (885-91), Alexander II (1061–73), and Urban II (1088–99). The study of the manuscript by Ewald ["Neues Archiv", V (1880), 275 sqq., 503 sqq.] led to important conclusions concerning the volumes of the Regesta. Another manuscript at Cambridge contains some seventy letters from the Regesta of Adrian IV (1154–59), Alexander III (1159–81), and Lucius III (1181–85) [see Löwenfeld in "Neues Archiv", X, 1885, 585 sqq.]. Again, large parts of the Regesta of Gregory VII (1073–85), namely 381 letters, are contained in a manuscript in the Vatican archives. This collection is also only an extract of the original Regesta. In it the letters are no longer arranged according to indictions, but according to the year of the pontificate. A fraction of the Regesta of the antipope Anacletus II (1130–38) containing thirty-eight letters has been preserved in a manuscript of Monte Cassino (Ewald in "Neues Archiv", III, 164 sqq.). Besides these collections of letters which have preserved fragments of the earliest papal Regesta, rich material is also to be found in the canonical collections of the Middle Ages. In part these collections go back directly or indirectly to the volumes of the Regesta of the papal archives, from which the authors of these collections, as Anselm of Lucca, and above all Deusdedit, gathered the greater part of their material.

== From the 13th century ==
From Pope Innocent III onward the manuscript volumes of the papal Regesta still exist in the Vatican Archives.

The Regesta of the 13th century are beautifully written parchment volumes. Yet the most of these in their present form have been made from older volumes. How these older volumes, the real original Regesta, were planned cannot be decided. From the 14th century onward, registry volumes of paper were used for the entering of the copies. However, when the popes returned from Avignon to Rome, these paper Regesta were left at Avignon, and copies of them were made in parchment registry volumes that were brought to Rome. At a later era, the original Regesta volumes were also brought to the Vatican Archives so that there are two series in existence for the Avignon epoch of the 14th century. From the 14th century onwards the volumes of the Regesta were generally made of paper. Multiple investigations have been made by various scholars as to the arrangement of the volumes of the Regesta, the rules or customs observed in the entering of the separate pieces, as to the question of whether the draft or the finished letter was copied, and as to many other matters in diplomatics, without reaching very certain results. In the 13th century the letters were divided into "Litteræ communes" and "Litteræ de curia" or "Curiales", the latter dealing mostly with affairs of general importance. At a later date other headings (litteræ secretæ, litteræ de beneficiis) were also introduced. Besides the regular Regesta of the papal letters made in the papal chancery, there were similar Regesta of the papal letters executed since the 14th century in the Apostolic Camera. From about the middle of the 14th century the registers of petitions were also preserved, in which were entered, not the papal documents, but the memorials to the pope, in reply to which the papal documents were issued.

== As historical sources ==
As collections of the official documents of the papal chancery, the Regesta are a very important historical authority. For convenience in historical investigation various scholars have published in chronological order all known papal documents of large periods, with brief summaries of the contents of the letters. The three greatest collections of this kind are:

- Philipp Jaffé, "Regesta Pontificum Romanorum ab condita ecclesia ad annum p. Chr. n. 1198"; 2nd ed. by S. Löwenfeld, F. Kaltenbrunner, P. Ewald (2 vols., Leipzig, 1888); 3rd ed. by Klaus Herbers, Waldemar Könighaus, Cornelia Scherer, Thorsten Schlauwitz, Marucs Schütz, Viktoria Trenkle, Judith Werner (vol. 1 (39?-604), Göttingen 2016).
- Paul Fridolin Kehr has undertaken a new edition of the Regesta for this period in topographical and at the same time chronological order: "Regesta Pontif. Roman.: Italia Pontifica" (Berlin, 1906–); "Germania Pontificia" (Berlin, 1910-); Gallia Pontificia; Iberia Pontificia; Polonia Pontificia; with the cooperation of other scholars.
- Jaffé's work was supplemented by August Potthast, "Regesta Pontificum Romanorum inde ab an p. Chr. n. 1198 ad an. 1304 (2 vols., Berlin, 1874-75).

The database "Regesta Pontificum Romanorum online" from the "Göttinger Papsturkundenwerk" will combine the several Regesta projects up to the year 1198.

Letters of several popes taken from the volumes of the Regesta have been published by: Löwenfeld: "Epistolæ Pontificum Romanorum ineditæ" (Leipzig, 1885) taken from the manuscript at Cambridge; Rodenberg, "Epistolæ sæc. XIII e Regestis Rom. Pont. selectæ" (Berlin, 1883 —), in "Mon. Germ. Hist." The Regesta of the letters of Gregory I were edited again by Ewald and Hartmann, "Gregorii I Registrum epistolarum" in "Mon. Germ. Hist." (Berlin, 1891 —).

The letters of Gregory VII were edited by Jaffé, "Monumenta Gregoriana" in "Bibliotheca Rerum Germanicarum" (2 vols., Berlin, 1868). As early as 1591 the records of John VIII were published from the manuscript in the Vatican. Of the popes of the 13th century, Pressuti edited (Rome, 1888–96) the Regesta on Honorarius III (1216–27) from the volumes of the Regesta in the Vatican Archives; the Regesta of the succeeding popes to Boniface VII (d. 1303) were edited by the members of the Ecole Françoisaise of Rome, the publication of the Regesta of all the popes being yet incomplete; after a group of Benedictines had issued the Regesta of Clement V (1305–14), the members of the Ecole Françoisaise began again with John XXII (1316–34), with the intention of publishing the Regesta of the Avignon popes to Gregory XI (1370–78). In this later series, besides the documents of general interest, they kept in view particularly those documents that bore on the history of France. For the later eras only the first numbers were published of the Regesta of Leo X (1513–21), edited by Cardinal Hergenröther (see under the different popes).

In addition a number of works have been issued or are in course of publication that contain Regesta from the Vatican Regesta of the 14th century, bearing on special questions or on the history of various countries and dioceses, e.g., Werunsky, "Excerpts ex registris Clementis VI et Innocenti VI (Innsbruck, 1885); Ruezler, "Vatikanische Akten zur deutschen Geschichte in der Zeit Ludwigs des Bayern" (Munich, 1890).
