= Matthias Donath =

German art historian and author

Matthias Donath (born in 1975) is a German art historian and author.

He appears as an expert discussing the Pergamon Altar in the second season of the television show Museum Secrets.
