= Bernhard von Kugler =

German historian

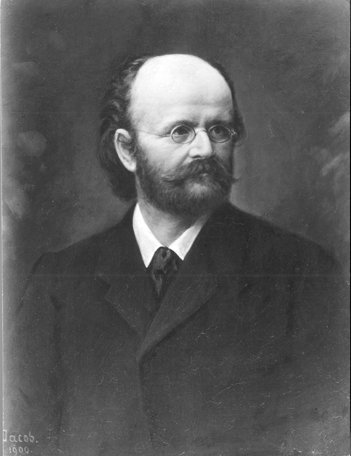
- Born: 14 June 1837; Berlin, Kingdom of Prussia
- Died: 7 April 1898 (aged 60); Tübingen, German Empire

Academic background
- Education: University of Greifswald; University of Tübingen; Ludwig-Maximilians-Universität München

Academic work
- Discipline: Historian
- Institutions: University of Tübingen
- Main interests: History of the Crusades

Bernhard von Kugler (14 June 1837 – 7 April 1898) was a German historian. He is largely known for his research of the Crusades.

He studied at the University of Greifswald, the University of Tübingen, and the Ludwig-Maximilians-Universität München, obtaining his habilitation in history at the Ludwig-Maximilians-Universität München in 1861. Later, he became an associate professor (1867) and a full professor of history (1874) at the University of Tübingen.

He was the son of art historian Franz Theodor Kugler (1808–1858).

== Published works ==
- Boemund und Tankred, Fürsten von Antiochien : ein Beitrag zur Geschichte der Normannen in Syrien, 1862 – Bohemond and Tancred, prince of Antioch: a contribution to the history of the Normans in Syria.
- Ulrich Herzog zu Wirtemberg, 1865 – Ulrich, Duke of Württemberg.
- Studien zur Geschichte des zweiten Kreuzzuges, 1866 – Studies involving the history of the Second Crusade.
- Christoph, Herzog zu Wirtemberg (two volumes 1868, 1872) – Christoph, Duke of Württemberg.
- Analecten zur Geschichte des zweiten Kreuzzugs. 1878 - Selections from the history of the Second Crusade.
- Geschichte der Kreuzzüge, 1880 – History of the Crusades.
- Neue Analecten zur Geschichte des zweiten Kreuzzuges, 1883 - New selections from the history of the Second Crusade.
- Albert von Aachen 1885 – Albert of Aix.
