= August Potthast =

German historian (1824–1898)

August Potthast (13 August 1824, Höxter, Province of Westphalia – 13 February 1898, Leobschütz), was a German historian, was born at Höxter, and was educated at Paderborn, Münster and Berlin.

He assisted GH Pertz, the editor of the Monumenta Germaniae Historica, and edited the Regesta pontificum romanorum, 1198-1304 (Berlin, 1874–1875). From 1874 to 1894 he was librarian of the German Reichstag.

Potthast is chiefly known through his monumental Bibliotheca historica medii aevi (1862), a guide to the sources of European history in the Middle Ages. The work, in the form of an index, gives particulars of practically all the historical writers of Europe and their work between 375 and 1500. A new and enlarged edition appeared at Berlin in 1896.
