= Paul Scheffer-Boichorst =

Paul Scheffer-Boichorst (25 May 1843 in Elberfeld – 17 January 1902 in Berlin) was a German historian of the Middle Ages.

He studied history at the universities of Innsbruck, Göttingen and Berlin, receiving his doctorate from Leipzig University in 1867. Later on, he worked on the Monumenta Germaniae Historica project in Munich and Berlin. In 1875, he became an associate professor of history at the University of Giessen, then relocated to Strasbourg as a full professor during the following year. From 1890 onward, he taught classes at the University of Berlin.

He was a member of the Prussian Academy of Sciences. From 1891 to 1902 he was a member of the Central Directorate of the Monumenta Germaniae Historica. He is credited for reconstruction of the Annales Patherbrunnenses.

== Selected works ==
- Kaiser Friedrich' I. letzter streit mit der Kurie, 1866 – Emperor Frederick I. last quarrel with the Curia
- Annales Patherbrunnenses : eine verlorene Quellenschrift des zwölften Jahrhunderts aus Bruchstücken wiederhergestellt, 1870 – "Annales Patherbrunnenses"; a lost source of 12th century fragments recovered.
- Florentiner studien, 1874 – Florentine studies.
- Die Chronik des Dino Compagni. Kritik der Hegel'schen Schrift "Versuch einer Rettung", 1875 – The chronicle of Dino Compagni. Critique of Karl von Hegel's "Versuch einer Rettung".
- Die Neuordnung der Papstwahl durch Nikolaus II, 1877 – The reorganization of the papal election by Nicholas II.
- Aus Dantes Verbannung, 1882 – From Dante's exile.
- Zur Geschichte des XII. und XIII. Jahrhunderts : diplomatische Forschungen, 1897 – History of the 12th and 13th centuries: diplomatic research.
- Kirchengeschichtliche Forschungen, 1903 – Church history research.
- Ausgewählte Aufsätze und Besprechungen, 1905 – Selected essays and discussions.
