= Ulrich Cartellieri =

German businessman

Dr. Ulrich Cartellieri (born 21 September 1937 in Erfurt) is a German businessman, a non-executive director of BAE Systems from 1999 to 2007, a member of the supervisory board of Robert Bosch GmbH and a member of the International Advisory Committee of the Federal Reserve Bank of New York.

On 28 October 2004, Cartellieri resigned from the board of Deutsche Bank because he could "no longer support" the leadership of CEO Josef Ackermann. He has also served on the boards of Karstadt AG (chairman), Siemens AG (deputy chairman), ThyssenKrupp and Henkel KGaA, and DEG.
