= Kurt Birrenbach =

German politician (1907–1987)

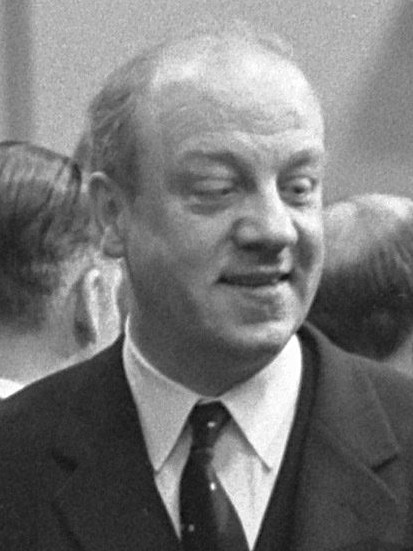
- Kurt Birrenbach (1963)

Member of the Bundestag
- In office 15 October 1957 – 13 December 1976

Member of the European Parliament for West Germany
- In office 29 October 1959 – 29 November 1961

Personal details
- Born: 2 July 1907 Arnsberg
- Died: 26 December 1987 (aged 80) Düsseldorf, North Rhine-Westphalia, Germany
- Party: CDU

Kurt Birrenbach (July 2, 1907 – December 26, 1987) was a German politician of the Christian Democratic Union (CDU) and former member of the German Bundestag.

== Life ==
Birrenbach joined the CDU in 1953. Birrenbach was a member of the German Bundestag from 1957 to 1976, where he was a member of the Foreign Affairs Committee throughout. He was also a member of the European Parliament from 29 October 1959 to 29 November 1961.

== Literature ==
Herbst, Ludolf; Jahn, Bruno (2002). Vierhaus, Rudolf (ed.). Biographisches Handbuch der Mitglieder des Deutschen Bundestages. 1949–2002 [Biographical Handbook of the Members of the German Bundestag. 1949–2002] (in German). München: De Gruyter - De Gruyter Saur. p. 1715. ISBN 978-3-11-184511-1.
