= Johannes Haller =

Baltic German historian (1865–1947)

- Born: 16 October 1865; Käina, Governorate of Estonia, Russian Empire
- Died: 24 December 1947 (aged 82); Tübingen
- Education: University of Tartu; Frederick William University
- Occupation: medievalist
- Spouse: Elisabeth Fueter
- Children: 4
- Parent(s): Anton Haller (1833–1905), Amalie Sacken (1838–1899)

Johannes Haller (16 October 1865 – 24 December 1947) was a Baltic German medievalist and teacher at the universities of Tübingen, Marburg and Giessen.

Haller was born in Käina and studied history in Tartu and at the Frederick William University in Berlin. He was expert in the field of the history of Christianity. He died in Tübingen.
