= Alltagsgeschichte =

West German school of social history

Alltagsgeschichte (German; lit. 'history of the everyday' and sometimes translated as 'history of everyday life') is a form of social history that emerged among West German historians in the 1980s. It was founded by Alf Lüdtke (1943–2019) and Hans Medick (born 1939). Alltagsgeschichte can be considered part of the wider Marxian historical school of 'history from below'. It challenged the well-known framework of Strukturgeschichte ('history of structures'), within the German historical field and advocated for a new model of social history. It is related to microhistory.

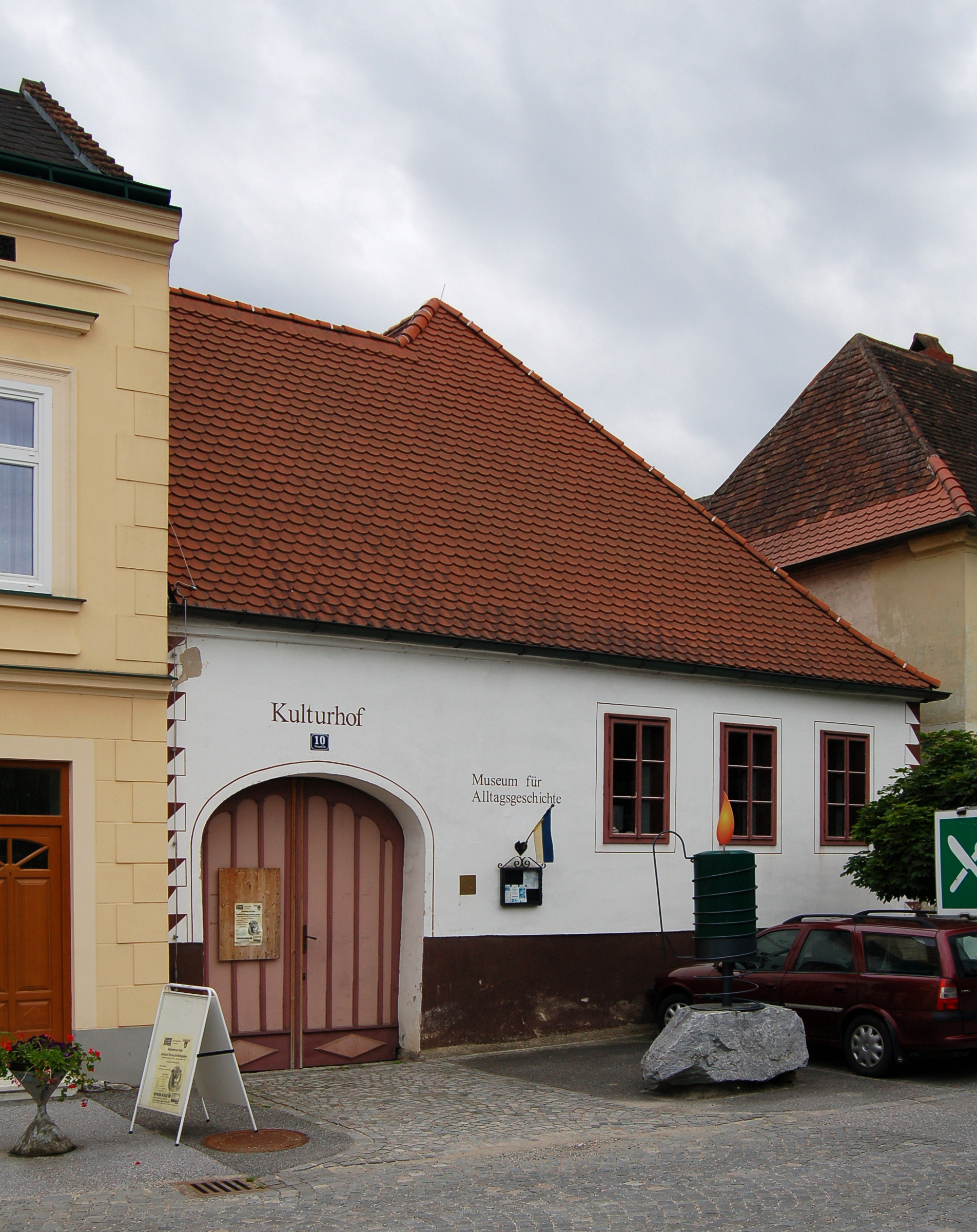
The Museum for Alltagsgeschichte in Pölla, Lower Austria

== Alltagsgeschichte ==
Alltagsgeschichte developed from the social and political upheavals of the 1960s when new social movements began to mobilize with political and academic voices. Its intention was to show the links between the ordinary "everyday" experiences of ordinary people in a society, and the broad social and political changes which occur in that society. Alltagsgeschichte becomes a form of microhistory because this massively broad endeavor to undertake can only feasibly be practiced on the most minute of scales. With the political shift in Germany during the 1990s, many historians deemed Alltagsgeschichte a casualty of the move from social history towards cultural history. It can also be linked to the Italian historical doctrine of microhistory (microstoria).

Alltagsgeschichte's leading proponents include Paul Veyne (born 1930) and Michel Rouche in France, and Peter Carr in the United Kingdom. Martin Broszat (1926–1989) was also strongly influenced by the method in his six-volume co-edited work on Bavaria under National Socialism entitled Bayern in der NS-Zeit (1977–1983).

== Popular culture ==
An example of Alltagsgeschichte becoming part of popular culture in Europe can be seen in the Austrian documentary series of the same name, produced between 1985 and 2006 by Elisabeth T. Spira. The series chronicled the everyday lives and stories of Austrian people in over 60 episodes.

== Selected publications ==
- The History of Everyday Life by German historian Alf Lüdtke
- Alltagsgeschichte - ein Bericht von unterwegs, by Alf Lüdtke, in Historische Anthropologie No. 11 (2003), pp. 278–295
- A History of Private Life: from Pagan Rome to Byzantium, Paul Veyne, ed. (Editions du Seuil, 1985)
- Portavo: an Irish Townland and its Peoples, Parts One and Two, by Peter Carr (White Row, 2003 and 2005)
- "The History of Everyday Life: A second chapter," by Paul Steege, Andrew Bergerson, Maureen Healy and Pamela E. Swett, in The Journal of Modern History, No. 80 (June 2008), pp. 358–378
- Eigen-Sinn. Życie codzienne, podmiotowość i sprawowanie władzy w XX w. [Eigen-Sinn. Alltagspraxis, Subjektivität und Herrschaft im 20. Jahrhundert], ed. by Thomas Lindenberger and Alf Lüdtke, ed. editing: Kornelia Kończal, translation: Antoni Górny, Kornelia Kończal und Mirosława Zielińska, Poznań: Wydawnictwo Nauka i Innowacje, 2018.
- Eigen-Sinn und Alltagsgeschichte. Ein Gespräch von Kornelia Kończal mit Alf Lüdtke und Thomas Lindenberger, in: Ein Theorieblog zu Alf Lüdtkes (1943-2019) Konzept des „Eigen-Sinns“, 10. Dezember 2021, https://eigensinn.hypotheses.org/#_ftn1.

== See also ==
- Social reproduction, a Marxian concept
- History of mentalities, a French tradition
- Historical anthropology
