= Alf Lüdtke =

German historian (1943–2019)

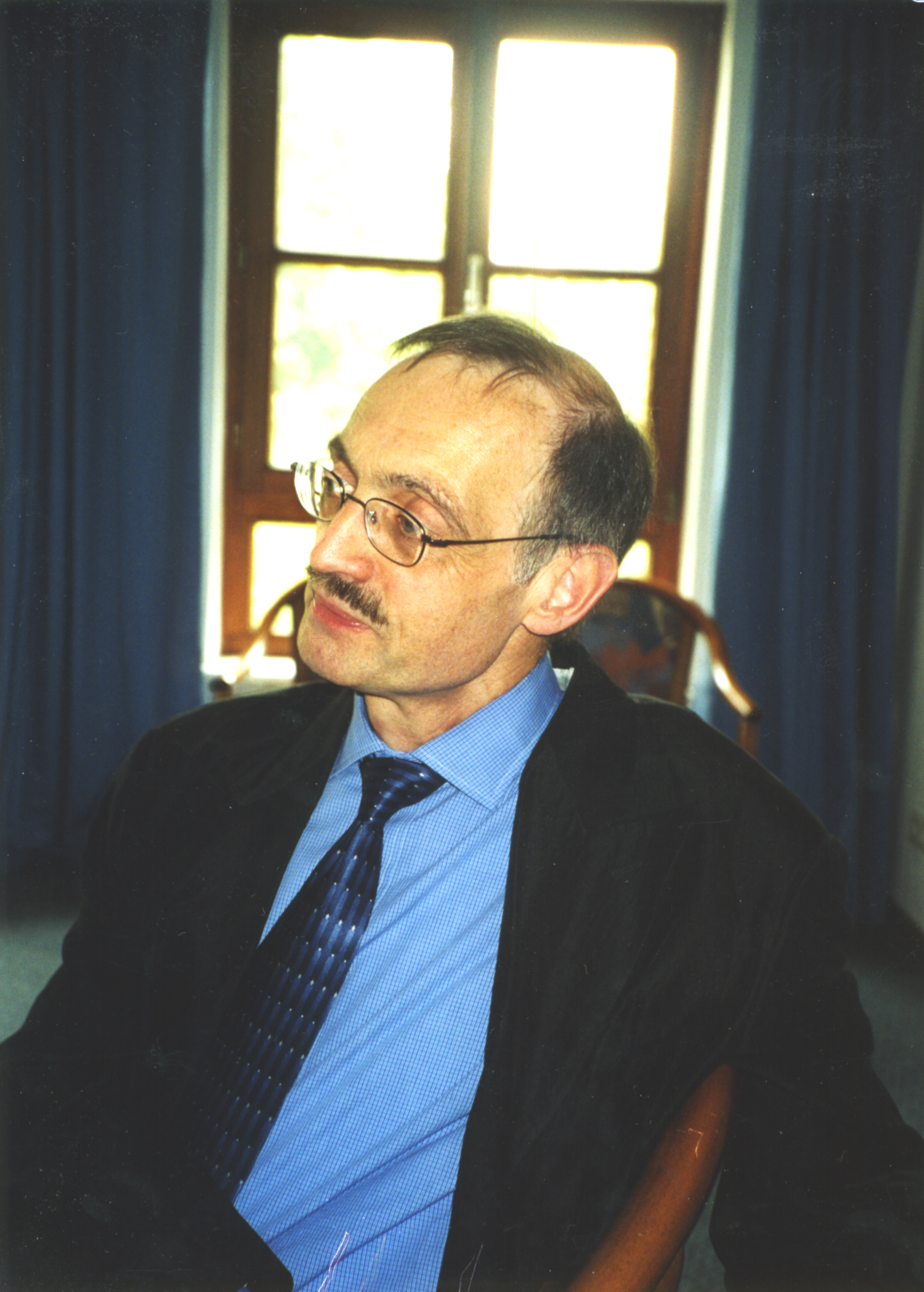
- Portrait of Lüdtke, 2008
- Born: October 18, 1943; Dresden, Gau Saxony, German Reich
- Died: January 29, 2019 (aged 75); Göttingen, Lower Saxony, Federal Republic of Germany
- Other name: Alf Luedtke
- Occupations: Historian and Hausmann
- Spouse: Helga Müller
- Children: 1

Academic background
- Education: University of Tübingen
- Alma mater: University of Konstanz
- Thesis: Gemeinwohl, Polizei und Festungspraxis (1980)

Academic work
- Discipline: History
- Sub-discipline: Social and microhistory
- Institutions: University of Hannover; University of Erfurt; Max Planck Institute for History; Humboldt University of Berlin; Hanyang University
- Notable ideas: Alltagsgeschichte and Eigensinn

Alf Lüdtke (18 October 1943 in Dresden – 29 January 2019) (also Alf Luedtke) was a historian and a leading German representative of the history of everyday life (Alltagsgeschichte in German). He said his main fields of interest and research include work as a social practice, the connection of production and destruction through "work", forms of taking part and acquiescing in European dictatorships in the 20th century, and remembering and memorialising forms of dealing with war and genocide in the modern era.

== Life ==
Together with Hans Medick, Lüdtke can be considered a founder of Alltagsgeschichte, a form of microhistory that was particularly prevalent amongst German historians during the 1980s.

Lüdtke studied history along with sociology and philosophy in Tübingen (1965-1972, MA 1974). In 1980 he obtained his doctorate at the University of Konstanz. Lüdtke's dissertation Gemeinwohl, Polizei und Festungspraxis analysed governmental violence practices of Prussia in the early 19th century. One of his articles, "The Role of State Violence in the Period of Transition to Industrial Capitalism: The Example of Prussia from 1815 to 1848", was published in Social History in 1979. His article describes the idea that state violence under the feudal system was necessary to create control amongst the Prussian working class in order to prepare them for the different structures of capitalist society. Lüdtke was interested in how the growth of the state and the growth of capitalism related to each other.

In 1988 he attained his habilitation in the fields of Modern History (Neuere Geschichte) and Contemporary History (Zeitgeschichte) at the faculty of the humanities and social science of the University of Hannover, where he subsequently taught history from 1989 to 1999. In 1995, he was appointed extraordinary professor at Hannover and in 1999, professor at the University of Erfurt. In Erfurt, Lüdtke was an honorary professor of historical anthropology from 2008. From 1975, Lüdtke worked at the Max Planck Institute for History in Göttingen. In 1999 Alf Lüdtke and Hans Medick founded the Arbeitsstelle für Historische Anthropologie (transl. (off-site)-Departement of Historical Anthropology) of the Max Planck Institute for History at the University of Erfurt.

From the 1980s, Lüdtke kept regular contacts in France and the USA, among other things through the International Round Table of History and Anthropology. From the beginning of the 1990s, he was regularly a guest professor at the historical seminar at the University of Michigan and the University of Chicago. At the end of the 1990s, Lüdtke's first contacts with South Korea developed, which evolved into regular scholarly exchanges. Beginning in 2005, he took part in the conferences on Mass Dictatorship at the Research Institute on Comparative Culture and History (RICH) in Seoul. From November 2008 to August 2013 he did seminars and workshops in South Korea as part of the "World Class University" program of the Korean National Research Foundation.

Since 2011 Lüdtke had been a member of the work group Erfurter RaumZeit-Forschung, and from 2014 he was a fellow at the Internationales Geisteswissenschaftliches Kolleg "Work and Life Cycle in Global Perspective" at Humboldt University of Berlin.

Lüdtke was the founder and editor of the journal Sozialwissenschaftliche Informationen, as well as co-founder and co-editor of the journals Werkstatt Geschichte and Historische Anthropologie. Kultur – Gesellschaft – Alltag.

Lüdtke combined issues of sociology, ethnology and anthropology with those of history. Especially through his research on the life worlds of industrial workers and so-called "ordinary" people, he gave impetuses to German and international historical science. His final research projects were: Blockings and Passages: the Grenzübergangsstellen [border checkpoints] of the GDR, War as Work, and The Recent State of Transnational Historiography.

== Works (selection) ==
=== Monographs ===
- „Gemeinwohl“, Polizei und „Festungspraxis“. Innere Verwaltung und staatliche Gewaltsamkeit in Preußen, 1815-50. (revised dissertation.), Göttingen 1982. (Police and State in Prussia, 1815–1850. Cambridge, New York 1989)
- (Deutscher Textilarbeiterverband, Hauptvorstand/Arbeiterinnensekretariat:) Mein Arbeitstag, mein Wochenende; Arbeiterinnen berichten von ihrem Alltag [Berlin, o.J. (1930?)], A. L. (Ed., Introduction), Ergebnisse Verlag, Hamburg, 1991. facsimile.
- Eigen-Sinn. Fabrikalltag, Arbeitererfahrungen und Politik vom Kaiserreich bis in den Faschismus. Ergebnisse Verlag, Hamburg 1993 (10 essays).

Contains among other things: Lohn, Pausen, Neckereien: ‚‘Eigensinn’ und Politik bei Fabrikarbeitern in Deutschland um 1900, (S. 120-160), Wo blieb die ‚rote Glut‘? Arbeitererfahrungen und deutscher Faschismus (S. 221-282), ‚Ehre der Arbeit‘; Industriearbeiter und die Macht der Symbole, Zur Reichweite symbolischer Orientierung im Nationalsozialismus (pp. 283-350) and the revised and extended inaugural lecture of 10 May 1989: Arbeit, Arbeitserfahrung und Arbeiterpolitik (pp. 351-440).

- Des ouvriers dans l’Allemagne du XXe siècle. Le quotidien des dictatures. Paris 2000.
- Publication of the „Aufschreibebuch“ of Paul Maik (worker in the cast steel factory of Krupp in Essen, 1919–1956), see also Alf Lüdtke: Writing Time – Using Space. The Notebook of a Worker at Krupp's Steel Mill – an Example from the 1920s, in: Historical Social Research (HSR) vol. 39 (2013), no. 3, pp. 216–228.

=== Collective volumes ===
- Alltagsgeschichte. Zur Rekonstruktion historischer Erfahrungen und Lebensweisen. Frankfurt, 1989 (Histoire du quotidien. Paris 1994. History of Everyday Life. Reconstructing historical experiences and ways of life. Princeton 1995. Ilsangsaran muotinga? Seoul 2002).
- Herrschaft als soziale Praxis. Historische und sozialanthropologische Studien. Göttingen 1991.
- Sicherheit und >Wohlfahrt<. Polizei, Gesellschaft und Herrschaft im 19. und 20. Jahrhundert. Frankfurt am Main 1992.
- Physische Gewalt. Studien zur Geschichte der Neuzeit. Frankfurt 1995 (with Thomas Lindenberger).
- Was bleibt von marxistischen Perspektiven in der Geschichtsforschung? Göttingen 1997.
- Akten, Eingaben, Schaufenster: Die DDR und ihre Texte. Erkundungen zu Herrschaft und Alltag. Berlin 1997 (with Peter Becker).
- Die DDR im Bild. Zum Gebrauch der Fotografie im anderen deutschen Staat. Göttingen 2004 (with Karin Hartewig).
- The No Man’s Land of Violence. Extreme Wars in the 20th Century. Göttingen 2006. (with Bernd Weisbrod).
- Staats-Gewalt: Ausnahmezustand und Sicherheitsregimes. Historische Perspektiven. Göttingen 2008 (with Michael Wildt).
- Everyday Life in Mass Dictatorship: Collusion and Evasion. Palgrave 2016.
