= Hans Medick =

German historian (born 1939)

- Born: 7 October 1939 (age 87); Wuppertal, Germany
- Occupation: Historian
- Known for: Research into violence during the Thirty Years' War
- Spouse: Doris Bachmann-Medick
- Children: Veit Medick

Academic background
- Education: University of Cologne; Heidelberg University; University of Erlangen
- Doctoral advisor: Kurt Kluxen

Hans Medick (born 7 October 1939) is a German historian. He was professor of Modern History and Historical Anthropology at the University of Erfurt and is known for his contributions to the history of the Thirty Years' War.

== Life ==
Born in Wuppertal, Medick studied history, philosophy, English and political science at the universities of Cologne, Heidelberg and Erlangen from 1959 to 1966. After graduating with a master's degree, he was a research assistant at the University of Erlangen from 1967 to 1973, where he also received his doctorate under Kurt Kluxen in 1971. In July 1972, he received the faculty prize for his dissertation. From 1973 to 2004, he worked as a research assistant at the Göttingen Max Planck Institute for the Study of Religious and Ethnic Diversity. After various teaching posts in Germany and Switzerland, he was appointed Visiting Professor at Johns Hopkins University in 1980. In 1993, he completed his Habilitation in Göttingen for the subject of Medieval and Modern History. In 1997, he became William A. Clark Professor of Early Modern History at the University of California, Los Angeles. From 1999 to 2004 he taught as Professor of historical anthropology at the University of Erfurt. Medick is co-editor of the academic journal Historische Anthropologie.

His research focuses on the experiences and representations of violence during the Thirty Years' War, concepts of person and self in their cultural expressions and practices, methodological approaches of microhistory and historical anthropology. Since the 1980s, Medick has been one of the protagonists of microhistory or Alltagsgeschichte, which already anticipated many of the methodological innovations of the cultural turn of historical studies (Neue Kulturgeschichte) in the 1990s. The aim was to expand historical social science, which focuses on general structures and processes, to include approaches that also include the level of concretely acting subjects. To this end, approaches from ethnology were to be made fruitful for historical science. To this end, Medick examined, for instance, the self-designs and social practices in the weaving village Laichingen between 1650 and 1900. Medick's essay Missionaries in the Rowboat (1984) is "still one of the key texts of a historiography 'from below'", judged Michael Wildt in 2016. He also contributed to the formulation of the concept of proto-industrialisation, which was developed primarily in everyday history.

Medick is married to the cultural scientist Doris Bachmann-Medick and has two sons, including the journalist Veit Medick.

== Publications ==
Monographs

- Naturzustand und Naturgeschichte der bürgerlichen Gesellschaft. Die Ursprünge der bürgerlichen Sozialtheorie als Geschichtsphilosophie und Sozialwissenschaft bei Samuel Pufendorf, John Locke und Adam Smith (Kritische Studien zur Geschichtswissenschaft. vol. 5). Vandenhoeck & Ruprecht, Göttingen 1973, ISBN 3-525-35955-1 (2nd, unchanged edition. ebenda 1981; in the same time: Dissertation, Erlangen-Nürnberg University 1971).
- with Peter Kriedte and Jürgen Schlumbohm: Industrialisierung vor der Industrialisierung. Gewerbliche Warenproduktion auf dem Land in der Formationsperiode des Kapitalismus (Veröffentlichungen des Max-Planck-Instituts für Geschichte. Vol. 53). Vandenhoeck & Ruprecht, Göttingen 1977, ISBN 3-525-35362-6 (english translation: Industrialization before Industrialization. Rural Industry in the Genesis of Capitalism. Cambridge University Press, Cambridge among others 1981, ISBN 0-521-23809-9; Italian translation: L’ industrializzazione prima dell’industrializzazione. Il mulino, Bologna 1984, ISBN 88-15-00557-9).
- Weben und Überleben in Laichingen 1650–1900. Lokalgeschichte als allgemeine Geschichte (Veröffentlichungen des Max-Planck-Instituts für Geschichte. vol. 126). Vandenhoeck & Ruprecht, Göttingen 1996, ISBN 3-525-35443-6 (in the same time: Habilitations-Schrift, Universität Göttingen 1992/93).
- Der Dreißigjährige Krieg – Zeugnisse vom Leben mit Gewalt. Wallstein-Verlag, Göttingen 2018, ISBN 978-3-8353-3248-5.

Editorships

- with David Sabean: Emotionen und materielle Interessen. Sozialanthropologische und historische Beiträge zur Familienforschung (Veröffentlichungen des Max-Planck-Instituts für Geschichte. Vol. 75). Vandenhoeck & Ruprecht, Göttingen 1984, ISBN 3-525-35390-1.
- with Anne-Charlott Trepp: Geschlechtergeschichte und allgemeine Geschichte. Herausforderungen und Perspektiven (Göttinger Gespräche zur Geschichtswissenschaft. Vol. 5). Wallstein-Verlag, Göttingen 1998, ISBN 3-89244-282-7.
- with Benigna von Krusenstjern: Zwischen Alltag und Katastrophe. Der Dreißigjährige Krieg aus der Nähe (Veröffentlichungen des Max-Planck-Instituts für Geschichte. Vol. 148). Vandenhoeck & Ruprecht, Göttingen 1999, ISBN 3-525-35463-0.
- with Kaspar von Greyerz and Patrice Veit: Von der dargestellten Person zum erinnerten Ich. Europäische Selbstzeugnisse als historische Quellen (1500–1800) (Selbstzeugnisse der Neuzeit. vol. 9). Böhlau, Cologne among others 2001, ISBN 3-412-15100-9.
- with Peer Schmidt: Luther zwischen den Kulturen. Zeitgenossenschaft – Weltwirkung. Vandenhoeck & Ruprecht, Göttingen 2004, ISBN 3-525-55449-4.
- with Andreas Bähr: Sterben von eigener Hand. Selbsttötung als kulturelle Praxis. Böhlau, Cologne among others 2005, ISBN 3-412-18405-5.

Research portal and digital editions

- Mitteldeutsche Selbstzeugnisse der Zeit des Dreißigjährigen Krieges (MDSZ)
