= Proto-industrialization =

Theory viewing rural handicraft production as a precursor to industrialization

- ? – c. 1760 (controversial)
Pre-industrial era
–
Ancient history (Iron Age)
Industrial Revolution
- Location: Europe; Middle East; South Asia; China
- Key events: Population growth; Glue production; Textile industries

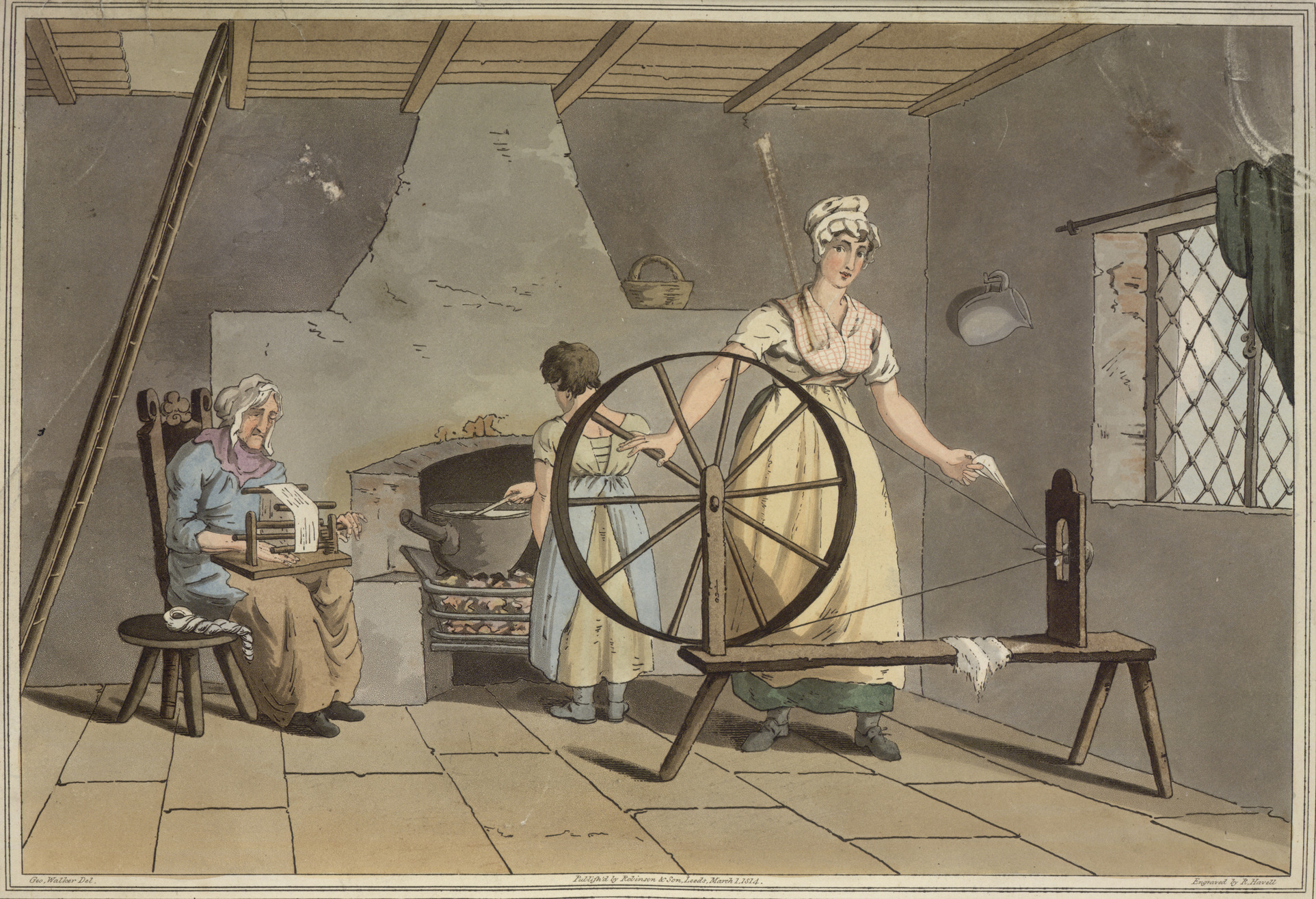
George Walker, 1814

Proto-industrialization is the regional development, alongside commercial agriculture, of rural handicraft production for external markets. Cottage industries in parts of Europe between the 16th and 19th centuries had long been a niche topic of study.

In the early 1970s, some economic historians introduced the label "proto-industrialization", arguing that these developments were the main cause of the economic and demographic growth and social change that occurred in Europe over this period, and of the Industrial Revolution that followed. Several theories were proposed to explain the mechanisms of this proposed causation.

Proto-industrialization theories have been challenged by other historians. They stress the importance of other factors that are downplayed in proto-industrialization theories. Empirical studies have demonstrated a variety of economic and demographic responses to proto-industrialization. In several cases it led to de-industrialization.

Later researchers suggested that similar conditions had arisen in other parts of the world, including Mughal India and Song China. A proto-industrial and even partially industrial economy has moreover been suggested for the Roman Empire between the 1st and 4th centuries AD.

== Theories ==
The concept was developed and named by Franklin Mendels in his 1969 doctoral dissertation on the rural linen industry in 18th-century Flanders and popularized in his 1972 article based on that work. Mendels argued that using surplus labor, initially available during slow periods of the agricultural seasons, increased rural incomes, broke the monopolies of urban guild systems and weakened rural traditions that had limited population growth. The resulting increase in population led to further growth in production, in a self-sustaining process that, Mendels claimed, created the labour, capital and entrepreneurial skill that led to industrialization.

Other historians expanded on these ideas in the 1970s and 1980s. In their 1979 book, Peter Kriedte, Hans Medick and Jürgen Schlumbohm expanded the theory into a broad account of the transformation of European society from feudalism to industrial capitalism. They viewed proto-industrialization as part of the second phase in this transformation, following the weakening of the manorial system in the High Middle Ages. Later historians identified similar situations in other parts of the world, including India, China, Japan and the former Muslim world.

The applicability of proto-industrialization in Europe has since been challenged. Martin Daunton, for example, argues that proto-industrialisation "excludes too much" to fully explain the expansion of industry: not only do proponents of proto-industrialisation ignore the vital town-based industries in pre-industrial economies, but also ignores "rural and urban industry based upon non-domestic organisation"; referring to how mines, mills, forges and furnaces fit into the agrarian economy. Clarkson has criticized the tendency to categorize all types of pre-industrial manufacturing as proto-industries. Sheilagh Ogilvie discussed the historiography of proto-industrialisation, and observed that scholars have re-evaluated pre-factory industrial production, but have seen it emerge as a phenomenon of its own rather than just a precursor to industrialisation. According to Ogilvie, a major perspective "emphasizes long-term continuities in the economic and social development of Europe between the medieval period and the nineteenth century." Some scholars have defended the original conceptualisation of proto-industrialisation or extended it.

== Europe ==
Mendels' initial coining of "proto-industrialisation" referred to commercial activities in 18th-century Flanders and much study focused on the region. Sheilagh Ogilvie wrote, "Proto-industries arose in almost every part of Europe in the two or three centuries before industrialization."

Rural proto-industries were often affected by guilds, which retained major influence over rural manufacturing in Switzerland (until the early 17th century), France and Westphalia (until the later 17th century), Bohemia and Saxony (until the early 18th century), Austria, Catalonia, and the Rhine area (until the later 18th century) and Sweden and Württemberg (into the 19th century). In other areas of Europe, guilds excluded all forms of proto-industry, including in Castile and parts of northern Italy. Political struggles occurred between proto-industries and regional guilds that sought to control them, as well against urban privileges or customs privileges.

Bas van Bavel argued that some non-agriculture activities in the Low Countries reached a proto-industrial extent as early as the 13th century, though with regional and temporal differences, with a peak in the 16th century. Van Basel observes that Flanders and Holland developed as urbanised regions (a third of Flanders' population being urban in the 15th century, and over half of Holland's population in the 16th century) with a commercialised countryside and developed export markets. Flanders saw the predominance of labor-intensive rural activities such as textile production, while Holland saw the predominance of capital-intensive urban activities such as shipbuilding. Proto-industrial activities in Holland included "glue-production, lime-burning, brick work, peat digging, barging, shipbuilding, and textile industries" targeted for export.

Historian Julie Marfany also put forward a theory of proto-industrialisation observing proto-industrial textile production in Igualada, Catalonia from 1680, and its demographic effects — including increased population growth that compared to the later industrial revolution. Marfany also suggests that a somewhat alternate mode of capitalism developed due to differences in the family unit compared to Northern Europe.

=== Switzerland ===
Proto-industrialization in Switzerland developed primarily around cities such as Geneva, St. Gallen, and Zurich, which participated little in mercenary service and where elites sought alternative economic activities. The system was characterized by the commercialization of peasant technologies using indigenous raw materials: flax in pre-Alpine hill regions of northeastern Switzerland and the Aargau-Lucerne border area, wool in the Fribourg Pre-Alps and Canton of Glaris, and iron ore and wood in the Jura Mountains. As the system matured, imported materials like silk and cotton became increasingly important.

Rural entrepreneurship played a central role, with merchants providing consumer goods to populations no longer living in autarky. The indebtedness of rural populations to these merchants created a system where commercial capital was transformed into proto-industrial capital through advances on goods and subsequent artisanal work arrangements. This often involved the truck system, which contemporaries recognized as exploitative.

Proto-industrialization flourished in areas of extensive agriculture or those with significant social inequality. In pre-Alpine regions, it combined with extensive livestock farming, while in wine-growing areas along Lake Zurich, it coexisted with intensive agriculture through gender-based labor division—women worked in silk production while men served as agricultural laborers. The proximity to cereal-exporting regions of Southern Germany (Alsace for Basel, Swabia for northeastern Switzerland) further supported this development.

The system significantly altered demographics and lifestyles, allowing rural households to participate in market economies and adopt new consumption patterns including white bread, meat, coffee, and tobacco. Young people could establish independent households without agricultural foundations, leading to increased marriage rates and population growth, particularly during the cotton industry boom of 1740–1785.

Swiss proto-industrialization provided crucial foundations for later industrialization through the accumulation of wage-dependent populations, artisanal skills, capital, and market knowledge. The resulting differentiated industrial structure enabled flexible responses to economic challenges, with centralized factory production and decentralized domestic work remaining linked in textile industries and watchmaking well into the 19th century.

== Mughal Empire ==
Some historians have identified proto-industrialization in the early modern South Asia, mainly in the wealthiest and largest subdivision of Mughal Empire, the Bengal Subah. The eastern part of Bengal (today's modern Bangladesh) was globally prominent in industries such as textile manufacturing and shipbuilding, and it was a major exporter of silk and cotton textiles, steel, saltpeter, and agricultural and industrial produce in the world. The region singlehandedly accounted for 40% of Dutch imports outside Europe.

== Song China ==
Economic development in the Song dynasty (960–1279) has often been compared to proto-industrialization or an early capitalism.

The commercial expansion began in the Northern Song dynasty and was catalysed by migrations in the Southern Song dynasty. With the growth of the production of non-agricultural goods in a cottage industry context (such as silk), and the production of cash crops that were sold instead of consumed (such as tea), market forces were extended into the life of ordinary people. There was a rise of industrial and commercial sectors, and profit-making commercialisation emerged. There were parallel government and private enterprises in iron and steel production, while there was strict government control of some industries such as sulfur and saltpetre production. Historian Robert Hartwell estimated that per capita iron output in Song China rose sixfold between 806 and 1078 based on Song-era receipts. Hartwell estimated that China's industrial output in 1080 resembled that of Europe in 1700.

An arrangement of allowing competitive industry to flourish in some regions while setting up its opposite of strict government-regulated and monopolized production and trade in others was prominent in iron manufacturing as in other sectors. In the beginning of the Song, the government supported competitive silk mills and brocade workshops in the eastern provinces and in the capital city of Kaifeng. However, at the same time the government established strict legal prohibition on the merchant trade of privately produced silk in Sichuan. This prohibition dealt an economic blow to Sichuan that caused a small rebellion (which was subdued), yet Song Sichuan was well known for its independent industries producing timber and cultivated oranges.

Many of the economic gains were lost during the Yuan dynasty, taking centuries to recover. Coal mining was a cutting-edge sector in the Song era, but declined with the Mongol conquest. Iron production recovered to an extent during Yuan, based mainly on charcoal and wood.

== See also ==
- Barbegal aqueduct and mills
- Pre-industrial society
- Putting-out system
- Sprouts of capitalism
- Venetian Arsenal
- History of the cotton industry in Catalonia
