= Michel Rouche =

French historian and academic (1934–2021)

- Born: 30 May 1934; Paris, France
- Died: 5 December 2021 (aged 87); Paris, France
- Occupations: Historian academic

Michel Rouche (30 May 1934 – 5 December 2021) was a French historian and academic. He specialized in the history of Gaul during the Roman Empire and in the Middle Ages.

== Biography ==
Rouche earned an agrégation in history in 1959 and subsequently taught at the Lycée Pierre-d'Ailly in Compiègne. He earned a doctorate in history from Paris-Sorbonne University in 1976 and became a professor at Charles de Gaulle University – Lille III, the Institut Catholique de Paris, and Paris-Sorbonne University.

Rouche was heavily focused on the end of ancient history and the establishment of barbaric kingdoms in the Early Middle Ages, notably the Visigothic Kingdom. He met Pope John Paul II in 1996 in Reims during a celebration in commemoration of the baptism of Clovis I. He also helped to draft the film Clovis et son temps, directed by Jacques Barsac.

Michel Rouche died in Paris on 5 December 2021, at the age of 87.

== Books ==
- L'Europe au Moyen Âge : documents expliqués (1969)
- L'Aquitaine des Wisigoths aux Arabes 418-781 : naissance d'une région (1979)
- Histoire générale de l’enseignement et de l’éducation en France. Tome 1, Des origines à la Renaissance (ve siècle av. J.-C.- xve siècle) (1981)
- Clovis, suivi de vingt en un documents traduits et commentés (1996)
- Clovis histoire et mémoire : actes du colloque international d'histoire de Reims (1998)
- Mariage et sexualité au Moyen Âge : accord ou crise ? : colloque international de Conques (2000)
- Charlemagne : Rome chez les Francs (2000)
- Le choc des cultures : romanité, germanité, chrétienté durant le haut Moyen Âge (2003)
- Le Moyen Âge en Occident : des barbares à la Renaissance (2003)
- Histoire de la papauté : 2000 ans de missions et de tribulations (2003)
- Les racines de l'Europe : les sociétés du Haut Moyen Âge, 588 à 888 (2003)
- Histoire du Moyen Âge VIIe - Milieu du xe siècle (2005)
- Auctoritas, mélanges offerts à Olivier Guillot : cultures et civilisations médiévales (2006)
- Petite histoire du couple et de la sexualité (2006)
- Les origines du christianisme : 30-451 (2007)
- Attila, La violence nomade (2009)
