= Kurt Kluxen =

German historian of modern age

Kurt Kluxen (10 September 1911 – 16 April 2003) was a German historian. From 1963 to 1979 Kluxen taught as a full professor for middle and modern history at the University of Erlangen-Nuremberg. He became known to a wider audience mainly through his History of England.

== Life and career ==
Born in Bensberg, Kluxen was the son of a teacher. He took up a four-semester teacher training course at the Pädagogische Akademie Bonn. From 1935 to 1938 he worked as a primary school teacher in Hinterpommern. After the war and his return from British war captivity he studied history, philosophy and German literature at the University of Cologne and the University of Glasgow from 1947. In 1949 he received his doctorate with a thesis supervised by Theodor Schieder on the political thought of Machiavelli (years later, he was a member of the Schieder commission). In 1954, he habilitated at the University of Cologne on Das Problem der politischen Opposition. Entwicklung und Wesen des englischen Zweiparteiensystems im 18. Jahrhundert (The Problem of Political Opposition. Development and nature of the English two-party system in the 18th century.) In 1950 he became professor at the Pedagogical Academy in Bonn and in 1960 at the University of Cologne. From 1961 to 1963 he was founding rector of the Pädagogische Hochschule in Neuss. From 1963 until his retirement in 1979 he taught Medieval and Modern History at the University of Erlangen.

Since the 1950s Kluxen has been working on the political history of ideas of the early modern period. His main research focus, however, was English history. Until the late 1980s, he worked on English parliamentary, party and constitutional history. His English History from the Beginnings to the Present, first published in 1968, became a standard work and was published in 1991 in a fourth edition. Kluxen was Corresponding Fellow of the Royal Historical Society in London and was awarded the 1st Class of the Order of Merit of the Federal Republic of Germany. In 1980 he became first chairman of the Prinz-Albert-Gesellschaft. Commemorative publications were dedicated to Kluxen after the completion of the sixtieth year of life in 1972 and on the occasion of his 85th birthday in 1996. Frank-Lothar Kroll published 21 smaller contributions by Kluxen. These writings are intended to represent a "representative selection [...] of his complete oeuvre". With this collection Kroll wants to provide "building blocks for a cross-border, pan-European view of history". He was criticized for a view of history that was called ethnocentric and static, and placed primary focus on European or Western history.

Kluxen died in Erlangen at the age of 91.

== Writings ==
Monographs

- Der Begriff der necessità im Denken Machiavellis. Cologne Phil. Fakultät, Dissertation vom 11. November 1950.
- Das Problem der politischen Opposition. Entwicklung und Wesen der englischen Zweiparteienpolitik im 18. Jahrhundert. Alber, Freiburg among others 1956.
- Politik und menschliche Existenz bei Machiavelli. Dargestellt am Begriff der Necessità. Kohlhammer, Stuttgart among others 1967.
- Geschichte von Bensberg. Schöningh, Paderborn 1956, ISBN 3-506-74590-5.
- Vorlesungen zur Geschichtstheorie. 2 volumes. Paderborn 1974–1981,
  - Vorlesungen zur Geschichtstheorie. Part 1. Schöningh, Paderborn 1974, ISBN 3-506-77437-9.
  - Vorlesungen zur Geschichtstheorie. Part 2. Schöningh, Paderborn 1981, ISBN 3-506-77458-1.
- Geschichte Englands. Von den Anfängen bis zur Gegenwart. (Kröners Taschenausgabe. Vol. 374). 4th edition. Kröner, Stuttgart 1991, ISBN 3-520-37404-8.
- England in Europa. Studien zur britischen Geschichte und zur politischen Ideengeschichte der Neuzeit. (Historische Forschungen. Vol. 77). Edited by Frank-Lothar Kroll. Duncker & Humblot, Berlin 2003, ISBN 3-428-10599-0.

As editor

- Parlamentarismus (Neue wissenschaftliche Bibliothek. Vol. 18). 5th expended edition. Kiepenheuer & Witsch, Königstein 1980, ISBN 3-445-01687-9.
- together with Wolfgang J. Mommsen: Politische Ideologien und nationalstaatliche Ordnung. Studien zur Geschichte des 19. und 20. Jahrhunderts. Festschrift für Theodor Schieder zu seinem 60. Geburtstag. Oldenbourg, Munich 1968.

== Literature ==
- Ernst Heinen (ed.): Geschichte in der Gegenwart. Festschrift für Kurt Kluxen zu seinem 60. Geburtstag. Schöningh, Paderborn 1972, ISBN 3-506-73170-X.
- Frank-Lothar Kroll (ed.): Neue Wege der Ideengeschichte: Festschrift für Kurt Kluxen zum 85. Geburtstag. Schöningh, Paderborn 1996, ISBN 3-506-74826-2.
- Frank-Lothar Kroll: "Nekrolog Kurt Kluxen 1911–2003." In Historische Zeitschrift. Vol. 280 (2005), pp. 259–265.
