= Pamela E. Swett =

Canadian professor

Dean of Humanities McMaster University
- Incumbent
- Assumed office July 1, 2019

Personal details
- Education: Bryn Mawr College (BA); Brown University (PhD)

Academic work
- Discipline: History
- Sub-discipline: History of Nazi Germany
- Institutions: Brown University; McMaster University

Pamela E. Swett is a Canadian-American historian of 20th-century Germany and professor in the History department at McMaster University in Hamilton, Ontario, Canada. Swett has been the Dean of the Faculty of Humanities at McMaster University since 2019.

== Education and career ==
Swett has a bachelor's degree from Bryn Mawr College. She completed her Ph.D. at Brown University in 1999. She moved to McMaster University in 1999, and was promoted to full professor by 2015. In 2019 she became the dean of humanities at McMaster.

== Work ==
Swett's research is focused on the social and cultural history of the Weimar Republic and Nazi Germany. She is the author of several books and articles and is a coeditor of Reshaping Capitalism in Weimar and Nazi Germany with Moritz Föllmer (2022); Pleasure and Power in Nazi Germany (2011) with Fabrice d'Almeida and Corey Ross; and Selling Modernity: advertising in twentieth-century Germany (2007) with Jonathan Wiesen and Jonathan Zatlin. Swett and Wiesen are also coeditors of the Nazi Germany section of the online resource "German History in Documents and Images" by the German Historical Institute.

As dean, Swett has played a key role in the establishment of the Wilson College of Leadership and Civic Engagement. In September 2022, Swett announced that the humanities at McMaster would be receiving a donation of 50 million dollars, the largest ever gift to the humanities in Canada from Lynton "Red" Wilson. The gift will establish a new multi-disciplinary college at McMaster; the Wilson College will be offering degrees in leadership and civic studies and will be the only program of its kind in Canada at the undergraduate level.

== Selected publications ==
- Swett, Pamela E. (2004). Neighbors and enemies: the culture of radicalism in Berlin, 1929-1933. New York: Cambridge University Press. ISBN 978-0-521-83461-2.
- Swett, Pamela E.; Wiesen, S. Jonathan; Zatlin, Jonathan R., eds. (2007). Selling modernity: advertising in twentieth-century Germany. Durham, NC: Duke Univ. Press. ISBN 978-0-8223-9035-0.
- Swett, Pamela E.; Ross, Corey; d’Almeida, Fabrice, eds. (2011). Pleasure and Power in Nazi Germany. London: Palgrave Macmillan UK. doi:10.1057/9780230306905. ISBN 978-1-349-32275-6.
- Swett, Pamela E. (2014). Selling Under the Swastika: advertising and commercial culture in Nazi Germany. Stanford, Calif: Stanford Univ. Press. ISBN 978-0-8047-7355-3.
- Swett, Pamela E. (2022). Reshaping Capitalism in Weimar and Nazi Germany. New York: Cambridge University Press. ISBN 978-1-108-83354-7.
- Swett, P. E., & Wiesen, S. J. (2024). Nazi Germany: Society, Culture, and Politics. Bloomsbury Publishing. ISBN 978-1-350-11262-9
- Swett, Pamela (2024-04-06). "Humanities are taking a backseat to STEM education and that is creating problems". Toronto Star. Archived from the original on April 8, 2024.

== Honors and awards ==
Her dissertation received Brown University's Joukowsky Family Dissertation Award for distinguished thesis in the Social Sciences in 1999.
