= Anton Schindling =

German historian of modern age (1947–2020)

Anton Schindling (20 January 1947 in Frankfurt - 4 January 2020 in Tübingen) was a German historian. He held chairs at the Catholic University of Eichstätt-Ingolstadt (1985–1987), the University of Osnabrück (1987–1995) and the University of Tübingen (1995–2015). Thematically he worked on the history of education, the age of Confessionalization and the Holy Roman Empire. He was one of the leading early modern researchers in Germany.

== Life and achievements ==
Born in Frankfurt, the son of a master carpenter, Schindling attended elementary school in Frankfurt-Höchst from 1953 to 1957 and the Neusprachliches Leibnizschule (Frankfurt am Main) from 1957 to 1966. He took his Abitur there in 1966. From 1966 to 1974 he studied history, art history, philosophy and political science at the Goethe University Frankfurt. In 1971 he passed the Staatsexamen for teaching at grammar schools in the subjects of history and political science.

From 1968 to 1974, Schindling was first a research assistant and from 1971 a research associate of the Historical Commission at the Bavarian Academy of Sciences. He was an assistant at the Edition der Deutschen Reichstagsakten - Mittlere Reihe (Reichstag 1512) at Friedrich Hermann Schubert. From 1969 to 1974 he worked as Schubert's doctoral student on the dissertation on Gymnasium und Akademie in Straßburg 1538 to 1621. After Schubert's death Johannes Kunisch took over the supervision of the work. He received his doctorate from Kunisch in 1974. From August 1974 he was administrator of a scientific assistant position at the Institute of History at the University of Würzburg at the chair of modern history with Peter Baumgart. From January 1976 he worked as a research assistant. His habilitation was completed in 1983 at the University of Würzburg about the beginnings of the Perpetual Diet of Regensburg. The 1991 published work became a standard work. From 1975 to 1980, he regularly devoted himself to archival work in Vienna at the Haus-, Hof- und Staatsarchiv during the lecture-free period. In July 1983 he was appointed a temporary academic senior advisor.

In the winter semester 1983/84 and summer semester 1984 he worked as Privatdozent in Würzburg. From the winter semester 1985/86 to the winter semester 1986/87, Schindling taught as a professor at the University of Eichstätt. From the summer semester 1987 to the summer semester 1995, Schindling taught as professor of early modern history at the University of Osnabrück. In March 1990, he declined an appointment to the professorship for Medieval and Modern History as successor of Konrad Repgen at the Rheinische Friedrich-Wilhelms-Universität Bonn. From winter semester 1995/96 until his Emeritus in 2015, Schindling taught as Professor of Medieval and Modern History in Tübingen, succeeding Volker Press. In January 2000 he declined an appointment to the University of Würzburg as successor to Peter Baumgart. In the winter semester 2006/07 he was Erasmus Programme-Exchange Professor at the Jagiellonian University in Krakow. Schindling was appointed Senior Professor at the University of Tübingen. In 2017 he donated his extensive private library to the Hungarian Academy of Sciences.

His main areas of work were the history of the early modern period, the political history and constitutional history of the Holy Roman Empire, comparative town and country history, comparative denominational history and history of education (school and university history). For the Encyclopedia of German History he wrote the volume on education and science from the Peace of Westphalia until the end of the empire. In recent years he has placed a focus on the history of East Central Europe. He intensified the contacts that Volker Press had already made at the end of the Cold War.

Schindling was awarded numerous scientific honours and memberships for his research. For his dissertation on the Strasbourg University, Schindling was awarded the Strasbourg Prize of the "Stiftung F.V.S." in 1974 and the Schongau Prize of the Académie d'Alsace in 1981. In 2014 he was awarded the Knight's Cross of the Hungarian Order of Merit. In 2016 he was awarded the Gold Medal of the University of South Bohemia in České Budějovice. From 1998 he was an extraordinary member of the Kommission for Bavarian Regional History at the Bavarian Academy of Sciences and Humanities. From 1983 he was a member of the Gesellschaft für fränkische Geschichte, from 1985 a member of the Frankfurter Historische Kommission and the Vereinigung für Verfassungsgeschichte and from 1988 a member of the Historische Kommission für Niedersachsen und Bremen. In addition, from 1996 he was a member of the board from 2002 and chairman from 2005 to 2015 of the Kommission für geschichtliche Landeskunde in Baden-Württemberg. From 1997 Schindling was co-editor of the Historisches Jahrbuch. He died on 4 January 2020 in Tübingen.

== Writings ==
A list of publications can be found at the Page of the University of Tübingen (as of October 2015).

Monographs

- Die Anfänge des immerwährenden Reichstags zu Regensburg. Ständevertretung und Staatskunst nach dem Westfälischen Frieden. (Veröffentlichungen des Instituts für Europäische Geschichte, Mainz. Vol. 143). von Zabern, Mainz 1991, ISBN 3-8053-1253-9 (Zugleich: Würzburg, Universität, Habilitations-Schrift, 1982–1983).
- Bildung und Wissenschaft in der frühen Neuzeit: 1650–1800. (Enzyklopädie Deutscher Geschichte. Vol. 30). 2nd edition. Oldenbourg, Munich 1999, ISBN 3-486-55036-5.

Editor

- with Walter Ziegler: Die Kaiser der Neuzeit 1519–1918. Heiliges Römisches Reich, Österreich, Deutschland. Beck, Munich 1990, ISBN 3-406-34395-3.
- with Walter Ziegler: Die Territorien des Reichs im Zeitalter der Reformation und Konfessionalisierung. Land und Konfession 1500–1650. Vol. 1–7. Münster 1990–1997.
- with Gyula Kurucz, Márta Fata: Peregrinatio Hungarica. Studenten aus Ungarn an deutschen und österreichischen Hochschulen vom 16. bis zum 20. Jahrhundert (Contubernium. Vol. 64). Steiner, Stuttgart 2006, ISBN 3-515-08908-X.
- with Franz Brendle: Religionskriege im Alten Reich und in Alteuropa.Aschendorff, Münster 2006, ISBN 3-402-06363-8.
- with Matthias Asche, Werner Buchholz: Die baltischen Lande im Zeitalter der Reformation und Konfessionalisierung. Livland, Estland, Ösel, Ingermanland. Kurland und Letgallen. Stadt, Land und Konfession 1500–1721. Part 1–4, Aschendorff, Münster 2009–2012, ISBN 978-3-402-11087-4.
- with Márta Fata: Luther und die Evangelisch-Lutherischen in Ungarn und Siebenbürgen. Augsburgisches Bekenntnis, Bildung, Sprache und Nation vom 16. Jahrhundert bis 1918 (Reformationsgeschichtliche Studien und Texte. Vol. 167). Aschendorff, Münster 2017, ISBN 978-3-402-11599-2.

== Literature ==
- "Schindling, Anton." In Wer ist wer? D The German Who’s Who. LI. edition 2013/14, p. 979.
- Franz Brendle: "Er lebte für die Geschichte. Der Historiker Anton Schindling ist gestorben." In Schwäbisches Tagblatt dated 11 January 2020 (Online).
- Hans-Christof Kraus: "Politik und Frieden. Konfessionsfragen: Zum Tod des Historikers Anton Schindling." In Frankfurter Allgemeine Zeitung dated 7 January 2020, Nr. 5, p. 11.
