= Johannes Kunisch =

German historian

Johannes Kunisch (31 January 1937 – 2 March 2015) was a German historian. He held chairs of early modern history at the Goethe University Frankfurt. (1972-1976) and the University of Cologne (1976–2002). Through his publications Kunisch became one of the leading German early modern historians. His biography Frederick the Great, published in 2004 and widely acclaimed, gave lasting impulses to Prussian research.

== Life and career ==
Born in Berlin, Kunisch came from a Prussian educated middle-class family. He was the son of the Munich professor of German studies Hermann Kunisch. In 1955 he passed the Abitur [German A-levels] at the Wittelsbacher-Gymnasium München. Kunisch initially intended to become an art dealer. At the instigation of his father he did not put this plan into practice. However, he has pursued this interest throughout his life as a collector of modern art.

From 1957 to 1963 Kunisch studied history and history of art and law at LMU Munich and the Free University of Berlin. In Munich, he studied with Franz Schnabel, Johannes Spörl and Hans Sedlmayr. In Berlin his academic teachers were Wilhelm Berges, Carl Hinrichs and Hans Kauffmann. In Munich, he received his doctorate from Spörl in 1963 with a topic on medieval architectural history of the 12th century. Kunisch was assistant to Friedrich Hermann Schubert at Kiel University from 1963 to 1968 and at the Goethe University Frankfurt from 1968 to 1972. From 1967 to 1969 he received a habilitation grant from the Deutsche Forschungsgemeinschaft for a habilitation project on the Austrian field marshal Ernst Gideon von Laudon, for which he also had to carry out major archival studies in Vienna. However, the "complete biography" planned on Field Marshal Laudon did not come about. Kunisch was habilitated in Frankfurt in the summer of 1971 on the "small war" and the army of the enlightened absolutism.

Since 1972, he has taught at the University of Frankfurt as H 2 Professor. In 1976, he was appointed full professor for Medieval and Modern History at the University of Cologne. There, he succeeded Ricardo Krebs, where he remained until his retirement in 2002. He declined a call in 1975 to Marburg University as successor to Gerhard Oestreich, as well as a call to the University of Erlangen–Nuremberg as successor to Kurt Kluxen. Among his academic students are Hans-Wolfgang Bergerhausen, Franz Josef Burghardt, Johannes Burkhardt, Harm Klueting, Helmut Neuhaus, Andreas Pečar, Gorch Pieken, Michael Rohrschneider, Lothar Schilling, Anton Schindling, Michael Sikora, Barbara Stollberg-Rilinger and Aloys Winterling.

In 1992/93 Kunisch was a member of the founding senate of the University of Potsdam, since 1997 he was a full member of the North Rhine-Westphalian Academy of Sciences, Humanities and the Arts. Kunisch was a member of the Vereinigung für Verfassungsgeschichte. Since 1974 he was co-editor of the newly founded Zeitschrift für historische Forschung and was also the editor of the first 29 volumes. The editorial board of the journal opted for a new periodization model. The late Middle Ages were detached from traditional medieval studies and linked to early modern times. The journal was to be dedicated to the "study of the late Middle Ages and early modern times". Under his leadership the Zeitschrift für Historische Forschung developed into the probably leading German journal for late medieval and early modern studies. Kunisch was one of the first historians to use the term Early Modern systematically. An essay Über den Epochencharakter der frühen Neuzeit (On the Epochal Character of the Early Modern Period) from 1975 is considered to be the impulse for this newly developing historical sub-discipline. Kunisch, and above all his student Barbara Stollberg-Rilinger as editor, also led to a consistent opening of the journal to cultural studies topics. Since 1993 he was co-editor of the journal Der Staat and since 1991 editor of the Forschungen zur Brandenburgischen und Preußischen Geschichte. From 1988 to 2005 he was chairman of the Preußische Historische Kommission.

His main research topics were the history of absolutism in Germany, the history of Prussia in the 18th century, military history of the early modern period, historical biography as well as the history of Frederick the Great. The dissertation dealt with the Doppelkirche Schwarzrheindorf and the influence that Conrad III and the Archbishop of Cologne Arnold II von Wied had on the construction of the building. Using the example of a chapel house from Staufer At that time Kunisch tried "to draw an extension of the knowledge of general history from the research of an architectural legacy". His dissertation was unusually interdisciplinary for the time.

One of the main aims of his research was to "penetrate state and war in thought". In his habilitation thesis he asked about the connection between state conflicts in the 18th century and the structure of early modern statehood. His habilitation thesis was the starting point for work on the "Little War", the "Miracle of the House of Brandenburg" and the house laws of the dynastic princely states. In 1986, he published a comprehensive account of absolutism, Kunisch presented a multi-volume edition of the writings of Gerhard von Scharnhorst. In November 2000 Kunisch held a conference in Berlin on the occasion of the 300th anniversary of the royal elevation of the House of Brandenburg. The contributions were published in 2002.

Kunisch achieved fame far beyond the specialist world in 2004 with a comprehensive and repeatedly published biography of the Prussian king. The biography is regarded as a standard work on the Prussian king. In his biography Kunisch also took art into account in detail. Whole chapters deal with the builder, the art collector, the writer and the general patron of the arts and sciences. Kunisch always also established a connection to the political biography of the Prussian king. The biography is regarded as his most important work. In 2011 Kunisch published a brief introduction about the Prussian ruler Frederick II.

Kunisch died in Bonn on 2 March 2015 at the age of 78 and was buried in Iffeldorf in Upper Bavaria.

== Writings ==
A list of publications appeared in Helmut Neuhaus, Barbara Stollberg-Rilinger (ed.): Menschen und Strukturen in der Geschichte Alteuropas. Festschrift für Johannes Kunisch zur Vollendung seines 65. Lebensjahres, dargebracht von Schülern, Freunden und Kollegen (Historische Forschungen. Vol 73). Duncker & Humblot, Berlin among others 2002, ISBN 3-428-10219-3, p. 451 ff.

Monographs

- Konrad III., Arnold von Wied und der Kapellenbau von Schwarzrheindorf (Veröffentlichungen des Historischen Vereins für den Niederrhein, insbesondere das Alte Erzbistum Köln. Vol. 9, ISSN 0931-0096). Schwann, Düsseldorf 1966.
- Feldmarschall Loudon. Jugend und erste Kriegsdienste (Archiv für österreichische Geschichte. Vol. 128, 3). Böhlau, Vienna among others. 1972, ISBN 3-205-04408-8.
- Der kleine Krieg. Studien zum Heerwesen des Absolutismus (Frankfurter historische Abhandlungen. FHA. Vol. 4, ISSN 0170-3226). Steiner, Wiesbaden 1973, (Zugleich: Frankfurt am Main, Universität, Habilitations-Schrift, 1971).
- Das Mirakel des Hauses Brandenburg. Studien zum Verhältnis von Kabinettspolitik und Kriegführung im Zeitalter des Siebenjährigen Krieges. Oldenbourg, Munich among others. 1978, ISBN 3-486-48481-8.
- Staatsverfassung und Mächtepolitik. Zur Genese von Staatenkonflikten im Zeitalter des Absolutismus (Historische Forschungen. Vol. 15). Duncker & Humblot, Berlin 1979, ISBN 3-428-04526-2.
- Absolutismus. Europäische Geschichte vom Westfälischen Frieden bis zur Krise des Ancien Régime (UTB, vol. 1426). Vandenhoeck & Ruprecht, Göttingen 1986, ISBN 3-525-03209-9; 2., überarbeitete Auflage 1999, ISBN 3-8252-1426-5.
- Fürst, Gesellschaft, Krieg. Studien zur bellizistischen Disposition des absoluten Fürstenstaates. Böhlau, Cologne among others 1992, ISBN 3-412-03091-0.
- Loudons Nachruhm. Die Geschichte einer Sinnstiftung (Nordrhein-Westfälische Akademie der Wissenschaften. Publisher G, Geisteswissenschaften. Vol. 359). Westdeutscher Verlag, Opladen u. a. 1999, ISBN 3-531-07359-1, doi:10.1007/978-3-322-88515-9.
- Friedrich der Große und die preußische Königskrönung von 1701 (Nordrhein-Westfälische Akademie der Wissenschaften. Vorträge. G, Geisteswissenschaften. Vol. 381). Schöningh, Paderborn among others 2002, ISBN 3-506-71480-5.
- Friedrich der Große. Der König und seine Zeit. C. H. Beck, Munich 2004, ISBN 3-406-52209-2.
- Friedrich der Große in seiner Zeit. Essays. C. H. Beck, Munich 2008, ISBN 978-3-406-56282-2.

Editions

- Der dynastische Fürstenstaat. Zur Bedeutung von Sukzessionsordnungen für die Entstehung des frühmodernen Staates (Historische Forschungen. Vol. 21). Duncker & Humblot, Berlin 1982, ISBN 3-428-05106-8.
- Expansion und Gleichgewicht. Studien zur europäischen Mächtepolitik des ancien régime (Zeitschrift für historische Forschung. Special issue. 2). Duncker & Humblot, Berlin 1986, ISBN 3-428-06065-2.
- Prinz Eugen von Savoyen und seine Zeit. Eine Ploetz-Biographie. Ploetz, Freiburg (Breisgau) among others 1986, ISBN 3-87640-194-1.
- Staatsverfassung und Heeresverfassung in der europäischen Geschichte der frühen Neuzeit (Historische Forschungen. Vol. 28). Duncker & Humblot, Berlin 1986, ISBN 3-428-05964-6.
- Neue Studien zur frühneuzeitlichen Reichsgeschichte (Zeitschrift für historische Forschung. Special issue. 3). Duncker & Humblot, Berlin 1987, ISBN 3-428-06193-4.
- Analecta Fridericiana (Zeitschrift für historische Forschung. Beiheft. 4). Duncker & Humblot, Berlin 1987, ISBN 3-428-06337-6.
- Persönlichkeiten im Umkreis Friedrichs des Großen (Neue Forschungen zur brandenburg-preußischen Geschichte. Vol. 9). Böhlau, KCologne among others 1988, ISBN 3-412-12588-1.
- Spätzeit. Studien zu den Problemen eines historischen Epochenbegriffs (Historische Forschungen. Vol. 42). Duncker & Humblot, Berlin 1990, ISBN 3-428-06905-6.
- Bismarck und seine Zeit (Forschungen zur Brandenburgischen und Preußischen Geschichte. Special issue. NF Bd. 1). Duncker & Humblot, Berlin 1992, ISBN 3-428-07314-2.
- Aufklärung und Kriegserfahrung. Klassische Zeitzeugen zum Siebenjährigen Krieg (Bibliothek der Geschichte und Politik. Vol. 9 (Bibliothek deutscher Klassiker.) Vol. 131). Deutscher Klassiker-Verlag, Frankfurt 1996, ISBN 3-618-66695-0.
- Neue Studien zur frühneuzeitlichen Reichsgeschichte (Zeitschrift für historische Forschung. Beiheft. 19). Duncker & Humblot, Berlin 1997, ISBN 3-428-09096-9.
- with Herfried Münkler: Die Wiedergeburt des Krieges aus dem Geist der Revolution. Studien zum bellizistischen Diskurs des ausgehenden 18. und beginnenden 19. Jahrhunderts (Beiträge zur politischen Wissenschaft. BPW. Vol. 110). Duncker & Humblot, Berlin 1999, ISBN 3-428-09577-4.
- Dreihundert Jahre Preußische Königskrönung. Eine Tagungsdokumentation (Forschungen zur Brandenburgischen und Preußischen Geschichte. Beiheft. NF vol. 6). Duncker & Humblot, Berlin 2002, ISBN 3-428-10796-9.

== Literature ==
- Ulrich Muhlack: "Johannes Kunisch (1937–2015)." In Historische Zeitschrift. 302 (2016), pp. 580–585.
- Helmut Neuhaus, Barbara Stollberg-Rilinger (ed.): Menschen und Strukturen in der Geschichte Alteuropas. Festschrift für Johannes Kunisch zur Vollendung seines 65. Lebensjahres, dargebracht von Schülern, Freunden und Kollegen (Historische Forschungen. Vol. 73). Duncker & Humblot, Berlin among others 2002, ISBN 3-428-10219-3.
- Barbara Stollberg-Rilinger: "Nachruf auf Johannes Kunisch." In: Zeitschrift für historische Forschung 42 (2015), pp. 187–189.
- Barbara Stollberg-Rilinger: Souveräner Denker. Zum Tod des Historikers Johannes Kunisch. In Frankfurter Allgemeine Zeitung, 9 March 2015, Nr. 57, S. 15.
- Konrad Repgen: Laudatio auf Prof. Dr. Johannes Kunisch in der 411. Sitzung am 17. Juni 1998. In Jahrbuch Nordrhein-Westfälische Akademie der Wissenschaften (1998), pp. 103–106.
- Gerrit Walther: Nachruf auf Johannes Kunisch in der Sitzung der Klasse für Geisteswissenschaften am 9. September 2015. In Jahrbuch Nordrhein-Westfälische Akademie der Wissenschaften (2017), pp. 91–94 (Online).
