= Gerhard Menk =

German historian and archivist (1946–2019)

- Born: 17 March 1946; Nisterau, Rheinland-Pfalz, Germany
- Died: 18 October 2019 (aged 73)
- Occupations: Historian and archivist

Gerhard Menk (17 March 1946 – 18 October 2019) was a German historian and archivist.

== Life ==
Born in Nisterau, after elementary school, Menk attended the Städtische Realschule in Bad Marienberg and took his Abitur at the Staatliches Neusprachliches Gymnasium Altenkirchen in spring 1966. Starting from the summer semester 1966, he studied first at the Goethe University Frankfurt, then went to Geneva for the summer semester 1969, where he studied at the University of Geneva as well as at the Graduate Institute of International Studies. Here were next to Jacques Freymond (1911-1998), especially the former Czechoslovak Foreign Minister Jiří Hájek and Saul Friedländer his academic teachers. For the winter semester 1969/70 he moved to the University of Vienna, where his academic teachers were Gerald Stourzh, Heinrich Lutz and Herwig Wolfram. In the summer semester of 1970 he returned to the University of Frankfurt to take the first Staatsexamen for the teaching profession at grammar schools in 1971 (among others Jochen Bleicken and Friedrich Hermann Schubert).

From the summer of 1971 Menk began his dissertation in Frankfurt under Friedrich Hermann Schubert, with a scholarship from the Fritz Thyssen Foundation allowing him to undertake extensive research trips to the Netherlands, Switzerland, Austria, Hungary and Czechoslovakia, and finally to the United States. At the same time he was a research assistant and assistant at the History Department of the university with Notker Hammerstein. In 1975 he received his doctorate with the thesis: Die Hohe Schule Herborn in ihrer Frühzeit 1584-1660, which was published in 1981 by the Historical Commission for Nassau.

In 1975 Menk began an archival clerkship in the Hessisches Hauptstaatsarchiv, which he completed with the Archivar Staatsexamen in September 1977 at the Archivschule Marburg. Starting from October 1977 he registered for the Land Hessen files of the OMGUS in Washington D. C. At the beginning of 1978 he was taken over into the Hessisches Staatsarchiv Marburg. From 1979 he was a lecturer at the Archivschule Marburg and member of the examination board. In 1981, he participated in the three-month stage of the Archives Nationales in Paris, where he acted as spokesman.

In 1981 he was appointed, as the only specialist historian, to co-editor of the Geschichtsblätter für Waldeck. He has left his mark on this magazine over two decades through numerous articles. In addition, he published several bio- and monographs on the history of the Principality of Waldeck and Pyrmont. In particular, the most recently published studies on the Waldeck politician and student council Otto Hufnagel and on "Waldeck in the Third Reich" attracted a great deal of attention.

In 1986 Menk took over a teaching position at the University of Gießen, in 2005 he was appointed honorary professor there; also in 2005 he received the science prize of the Hessian Ministry of Science and Art. As chairman of the branch association Marburg of the Verein für hessische Geschichte und Landeskunde (1998-2007), Menk conducted numerous colloquia, including on "The University of Marburg in the 1920s", on Hessian chronicles, the Greifswald professor and church historian from Waldeck Victor Schultze as well as on the Hessian Minister of Culture and judge at the Federal Constitutional Court Erwin Stein.

On 31 March 2011 Menk retired as senior archivist and died in 2019 at the age of 73.

Menk was a member of the Historical Commission for Hesse, the Historical Commission for Nassau and the Vereinigung für Verfassungsgeschichte, besides being also a member of several scientific advisory boards. He has published on the history of science and education, church history, constitutional and administrative history as well as on the history of archives between the High Middle Ages and the 20th century.

With his publications, which spanned a wide range of time and subject, he had a significant influence on historical research in Hesse, according to an obituary of the Hessisches Landesarchiv.

== Publications ==
- Die Hohe Schule Herborn in ihrer Frühzeit (1584–1660). Ein Beitrag zum Hochschulwesen des deutschen Kalvinismus im Zeitalter der Gegenreformation, Wiesbaden 1981 (publication of the Historischen Kommission für Nassau, 30).
- Menk, Gerhard (1992-08-01). "Zacharias Fridenreich (ca. 1573 bis ca. 1645). Ein lutherischer Jurist als Publizist und Praktiker im frühen 17. Jahrhundert". Zeitschrift der Savigny-Stiftung für Rechtsgeschichte: Germanistische Abteilung. 109 (1). Hans-Peter v. Haferkamp, Peter Oestmann, Joachim Rückert: 246–334. doi:10.7767/zrgga.1992.109.1.246. S2CID 184051420.
- Georg Friedrich von Waldeck (1620–1692). Eine biographische Skizze, Arolsen 1992 (Waldeckische Historische Hefte, 3).
- Der Weg zur waldeckischen Residenz Arolsen. Arolsen 1996 (Waldeckische Historische Hefte, 5).
- Das Ende des Freistaates Waldeck – Möglichkeiten und Grenzen kleinstaatlicher Existenz in Kaiserreich und Weimarer Republik. Second considerably extended edition, Waldeckischer Geschichtsverein e.V., Bad Arolsen 1998, ISBN 3-932468-04-X.
- Die "Denkwürdigkeiten" des Pfarrers Jonas Hefentreger-Trygophorus im Kontext. Bezugsfelder und Aussagekraft chronokalischer Überlieferung im 16. Jahrhundert, Bad Arolsen 2000 (Waldeckische Historische issue 6).
- as editor: Landgraf Moritz der Gelehrte von Hessen-Kassel. Ein Kalvinist zwischen Politik und Wissenschaft. Marburg 2000 (Contributions to Hessian history 15).
- Waldecks Beitrag für das heutige Hessen 2d considerably extended edition, Hessische Landeszentrale für Politische Bildung, Wiesbaden 2001, ISBN 3-927127-41-8.
- as editor: Angus Fowler, ein Schotte mit europäischem Kultuarauftrag. Reden auf dem Festakt zur Verleihung des Bundesverdienstkreuzes I. Klasse im Historischen Rathaus der Universitätsstadt Marburg am 18. Dezember 2000, Marburg 2001.
- Gustav Könnecke (1845–1920). Ein Leben für das Archivwesen und die Kulturgeschichte. Marburg-Kassel 2004 (Schriften des Hessischen Staatsarchivs Marburg 13, sowie Hessische Forschungen zur geschichtlichen Landes- und Volkskunde 42).
- as co-editor (together with Andreas Hedwig): Erwin Stein (1903–1992). Politisches Wirken und Ideale eines hessischen Nachkriegspolitikers, Marburg 2004.
- as co-editor (together with Wilhelm A. Eckhardt): Christian Wolff und die hessischen Universitäten, Marburg 2004 (Beiträge zur hessischen Geschichte 18).
- Ein "antiquitätischer Herr." Leben und Werk des hessischen Denkmalpflegers und technischen Pioniers Ludwig Bickell (1838-1901). Marburg 2005; also in Elmar Brohl, Gerhard Menk (ed.): Ludwig Bickell. Ein Denkmalpfleger der ersten Stunde, Stuttgart 2005.
- Vom Bismarckianer zum Liberalen. Der Politiker und Lehrer Otto Hufnagel (1885–1944) in Waldeck und Frankfurt am Main. 2 volumes, Marburg 2006.
- Landesgeschichte, Archivwesen und Politik. Der hessische Landeshistoriker und Archivar Karl Ernst Demandt (1909–1990), Marburg 2009.
- Waldeck im Dritten Reich. Voraussetzungen und Wirken des Nationalsozialismus im hessischen Norden, Wiesbaden-Korbach 2010.
- Zwischen Kanzel und Katheder. – Protestantische Pfarrer- und Professorenprofile vom 16. bis 20. Jahrhundert – Ausgewählte Aufsätze, Marburg 2011.
- as editor: Friedrich Uhlhorn: Geschichte der Grafen von Solms zwischen Reformation und Westfälischem Frieden. Darmstadt 2011.
- Politischer Liberalismus in Hessen zwischen Weimarer Republik und Nachkriegszeit – Rudolf Büttner, Margarete Grippentrog und die Deutsche Demokratische Partei Fuldas. Fulda 2012, ISBN 978-3-7900-0441-0.

Articles and archival publications are listed on the website of the Justus Liebig University (see under Weblinks).

== Literature ==
- Andreas Hedwig: Gerhard Menk im Ruhestand. In Archivnachrichten aus Hessen 11/1, 2011, S. 69f.
