= Sigrid Jahns =

German historian (born 1945)

Sigrid Jahns (née Langer) (born on 26 October 1945) is a German historian. Until 2009 she was professor of early modern history at the Department of History of LMU Munich.

== Life ==
Born in Malente, the daughter of a physician, after her Abitur in Osnabrück in 1965, Jahns began studying history, philology, philosophy and pedagogy, which she continued at Kiel University in 1967 and at the Goethe University Frankfurt in 1968. In 1972, she received her doctorate in philosophy from Friedrich Hermann Schubert in Frankfurt with a dissertation entitled Frankfurt, Reformation and Schmalkaldic League - the Reformation, Reich and Alliance Politics of the Imperial City of Frankfurt am Main 1525-1536. After a subsequent stay abroad and a Referendariat at a Bad Homburger Gymnasium, Jahns supervised the subproject Zusammensetzung und Sozialbeziehungen des Reichskammergerichts 1548-1806 from 1975 as a research assistant to Volker Press at the University of Giessen, which produced her two-part habilitation thesis Das Reichskammergericht und seine Richter. Verfassung und Sozialstruktur eines höchsten Gerichts im Alten Reich, which deals with the lawyers at the Reichskammergericht from the perspective of social and constitutional history.

== Publications ==
- Frankfurt, Reformation und Schmalkaldischer Bund. Die Reformations-, Reichs- u. Bündnispolitik der Reichsstadt Frankfurt am Main 1525–1536. Kramer, Frankfurt 1976, ISBN 978-3-7829-0162-8 (zugl. University of Frankfurt, FB Geschichtswissenschaften 1972: Dissertation.)
- Die Assessoren des Reichskammergerichts in Wetzlar. Eine Fallstudie. Publication series of the Gesellschaft für Reichskammergerichtsforschung, issue 2, Wetzlar 1986, doi:10.17176/20170309-191119
- Das Reichskammergericht und seine Richter. Verfassung und Sozialstruktur eines höchsten Gerichts im Alten Reich. Part 1: Darstellung. Böhlau Verlag, Vienna, Cologne and Weimar 2011, ISBN 978-3-412-06403-7
- Das Reichskammergericht und seine Richter. Verfassung und Sozialstruktur eines höchsten Gerichts im Alten Reich. Part 2: Biographies. 2 volumes. Böhlau Verlag, Vienna, Cologne and Weimar 2003, ISBN 978-3-412-06503-4
- Juristenkarrieren in der Frühen Neuzeit.
- Die Assessoren des Reichskammergerichts in Wetzlar.
- Das Kammerkollegium des Reichskammergerichts im Verfassungs- und Sozialsystem des Alten Reiches.
