= Heinz Gollwitzer =

German historian (1917–1999)

Heinz Gollwitzer (30 January 1917 – 26 December 1999) was a German historian. He held the chair of Modern Political and Social History at the University of Münster.

== Life ==
Gollwitzer was born in Nuremberg and grew up in Munich. After being severely wounded in World War II, he took up his studies (history and German literature) at the Ludwig-Maximilians-Universität München, earning his Ph.D. in 1944. He earned his qualification to teach as a professor in 1950 with a thesis called “The Image of Europe and the European Thought – Contributions to the German History of Ideas”. He subsequently taught at the Ludwig-Maximilians-Universität München and the University of Münster until his retirement in 1982. He died in Munich.

== Scientific focus ==
Gollwitzer's books mostly deal with the history of mentalities and political ideas, as well as with German regional history and biography. Due to the preponderance of structural history in the German scientific community during the post-war age, his impact on colleagues and students was rather small. This outsider position was to change from the beginning of the early Nineties, when historians became more and more sensible to universal history as well as to the relevance of personality in history, such in the case of the German nobility from the end of the ancien régime to the end of middle European monarchies in 1918, which was one of Gollwitzer's basic scientific aims.

== Works (selection) ==
=== German ===
- Europabild und Europagedanke. Beiträge zur deutschen Geistesgeschichte des 18. und 19. Jahrhunderts, Munich 1951 (zugl. Habil.).
- Die Standesherren. Die politische und gesellschaftliche Stellung der Mediatisierten 1815–1918, Stuttgart 1957 (Göttingen ²1964).
- Die gelbe Gefahr. Geschichte eines Schlagworts, Göttingen 1962.
- Geschichte des weltpolitischen Denkens, 2 Bde., Göttingen 1972-82.
- Ludwig I. von Bayern. Königtum im Vormärz, München 1986 (²1997).
- Ein Staatsmann des Vormärz: Karl von Abel, 1788–1859, Göttingen 1993.
- Weltpolitik und deutsche Geschichte (ed. Hans-Christof Kraus), Göttingen 2008. ISBN 978-3-525-36071-2.

=== English ===
- Europe in the Age of Imperialism 1880–1914, London 1969. ISBN 0-500-33014-X:

== Sources ==
- Heinz Dollinger et al. (ed.), Weltpolitik, Europagedanke, Regionalismus. Festschrift in the honour of Heinz Gollwitzer's 65th birthday, Münster 1982 (German).
- News release of the University of Münster to the death of Heinz Gollwitzer, December 28 1999 (German)
