= Andreas Pečar =

German historian

Andreas Pečar (born 1972) is a German historian of the Early modern period and a lecturer at the Martin-Luther-University Halle-Wittenberg.

== Life ==
Born in Freiburg im Breisgau, Pečar studied history and German language and literature at the Albert-Ludwigs-Universität Freiburg and the University of Cologne with a master's degree in 1997. From 1999 to 2001 he was a research assistant at the University of Cologne. He received his doctorate in 2002 with a thesis on the courtly nobility at the imperial court of Charles VI. His academic teacher was Johannes Kunisch. From 2001 to 2009 he was assistant at the University of Rostock and in 2005/06 he was a Fedor Lynen Fellow of the Alexander von Humboldt Foundation at Queen Mary College. After his habilitation and a substitute professorship (by Markus Völkel) in Rostock and another one in Halle, he became Professor of Early Modern History in Halle in 2010. In 2014 he became spokesman of the Landesforschungsschwerpunkt Aufklärung - Religion - Wissen.

Pečar is a member of the Historische Kommission für Sachsen-Anhalt and is on the board of trustees of the Leucorea Foundation. He was a fellow of the German National Academic Foundation and a Heisenberg Fellow of the DFG. In 2007/08 he was part of the Cluster of Excellence Cultural Foundations of Integration in Konstanz.

He deals with political cultural history (legitimation of power, political biblicism, representation of power, court culture, history of nobility) and Enlightenment research (with a focus on the self-dramatization of the Enlightenment and deconstruction of the Enlightenment). Among other things, he dealt with Frederick the Great as a writer.

On 1 February 2019, Pečar was elected chairman of the Historical Commission of Saxony-Anhalt.

== Publications ==
- as editor with Michael Kaiser: Der zweite Mann im Staat. Oberste Amtsträger und Favoriten im Umkreis der Reichsfürsten in der Frühen Neuzeit (Zeitschrift für historische Forschung. Beiheft. 32). Duncker und Humblot, Berlin 2003, ISBN 3-428-11116-8.
- Die Ökonomie der Ehre. Der höfische Adel am Kaiserhof Karls VI. (1711–1740). Wissenschaftliche Buchgesellschaft, Darmstadt 2003, ISBN 3-534-16725-2 (in the same time: University of Cologne, Dissertation, 2001).
- Ein Prinz von Geblüt auf dem Abstellgleis. Prinz Heinrich als Politiker. In Stiftung Preußische Schlösser und Gärten Berlin-Brandenburg. Jahrbuch. 4, 2001/2002, ISSN 2192-4538, pp. 113–124.
- Gab es eine höfische Gesellschaft des Reiches? Rang- und Statuskonkurrenz innerhalb des Reichsadels in der ersten Hälfte des 18. Jahrhunderts. In Harm Klueting, Wolfgang Schmale (ed.): Das Reich und seine Territorialstaaten im 17. und 18. Jahrhundert. Aspekte des Mit-, Neben- und Gegeneinander. (Historia profana et ecclesiastica. Geschichte und Kirchengeschichte zwischen Mittelalter und Moderne. 10). Lit, Münster 2004, ISBN 3-8258-7414-1, pp. 183–205.
- Das Hofzeremoniell als Herrschaftstechnik? Kritische Einwände und methodische Überlegungen am Beispiel des Kaiserhofes in Wien (1660–1740). In Ronald G. Asch, Dagmar Freist (ed.): Staatsbildung als kultureller Prozeß. Strukturwandel und Legitimation von Herrschaft in der Frühen Neuzeit. Böhlau, Cologne among others 2005, ISBN 3-412-11705-6, pp. 381–404.
- Zeichen aristokratischer Vortrefflichkeit. Hofzeremoniell und Selbstdarstellung des höfischen Adels am Kaiserhof (1648–1740). In Marian Füssel, Thomas Weller (ed.): Ordnung und Distinktion. Praktiken sozialer Repräsentation in der ständischen Gesellschaft (Symbolische Kommunikation und gesellschaftliche Wertesysteme. 8). Rhema, Münster 2005, ISBN 3-930454-55-6, pp. 181–197.
- Das symbolische Kapital der Ahnen. Genealogische Inszenierungen Herzog Ulrichs von Mecklenburg in Güstrow. In Kornelia von Berswordt-Wallrabe (ed.): Schloß Güstrow. Prestige und Kunst 1556–1636. Staatliches Museum Schwerin, Güstrow 2006, ISBN 3-86106-091-4, pp. 38–43 and pp. 218–219, (Exhibition catalogue).
- Am Rande des Alten Reiches? Mecklenburgs Stellung im Alten Reich am Beispiel landständischer Repräsentation und kaiserlichen Einflusses. In Matthias Manke, Ernst Münch (ed.): Verfassung und Lebenswirklichkeit. Der Landesgrundgesetzliche Erbvergleich von 1755 in seiner Zeit (Veröffentlichungen der Historischen Kommission für Mecklenburg. Series B: Schriften zur mecklenburgischen Geschichte. NF 1). Schmidt-Römhild, Lübeck 2006, ISBN 3-7950-3742-5, pp. 201–223.
- as editor with Kai Trampedach: Die Bibel als politisches Argument. Voraussetzungen und Folgen biblizistischer Herrschaftslegitimation in der Vormoderne (Historische Zeitschrift. Supplement. NF 43). Oldenbourg, Munich 2007, ISBN 978-3-486-64443-2.
- Macht der Schrift. Politischer Biblizismus in Schottland und England zwischen Reformation und Bürgerkrieg (1534–1642). (Publication of the Deutschen Historischen Instituts London. 69). Oldenbourg, Munich 2011, ISBN 978-3-486-70101-2 (in the same time: University of Rostock, Habilitations thesis, 2009).
- Autorität durch Autorschaft? Friedrich II. als Militärschriftsteller. Antrittsvorlesung, gehalten am 18. Januar 2012 (Hallesche Universitätsreden. 4). Universitätsverlag Halle-Wittenberg, Halle (Saale) 2013, ISBN 978-3-86977-067-3.
- with Damien Tricoire: Falsche Freunde. War die Aufklärung wirklich die Geburtsstunde der Moderne?. Campus, Frankfurt among others. 2015, ISBN 978-3-593-50474-2.
- as editor with Holger Zaunstöck, Thomas Müller-Bahlke: Wie pietistisch kann Adel sein? Hallescher Pietismus und Reichsadel im 18. Jahrhundert.(Quellen und Forschungen zur Geschichte Sachsen-Anhalts. 10). Mitteldeutscher Verlag, Halle (Saale) 2016, ISBN 978-3-86977-067-3.
- Andreas Erb, Andreas Pečar and Frank Kreißler (ed.): Unser Franz – Das Bild des Fürsten Franz von Anhalt-Dessau im Urteil der Nachwelt (1817–1945). Mitteldeutscher Verlag, Halle (Saale) 2018. ISBN 978-3-96311-027-6.
