= Iserlohn =

- Town
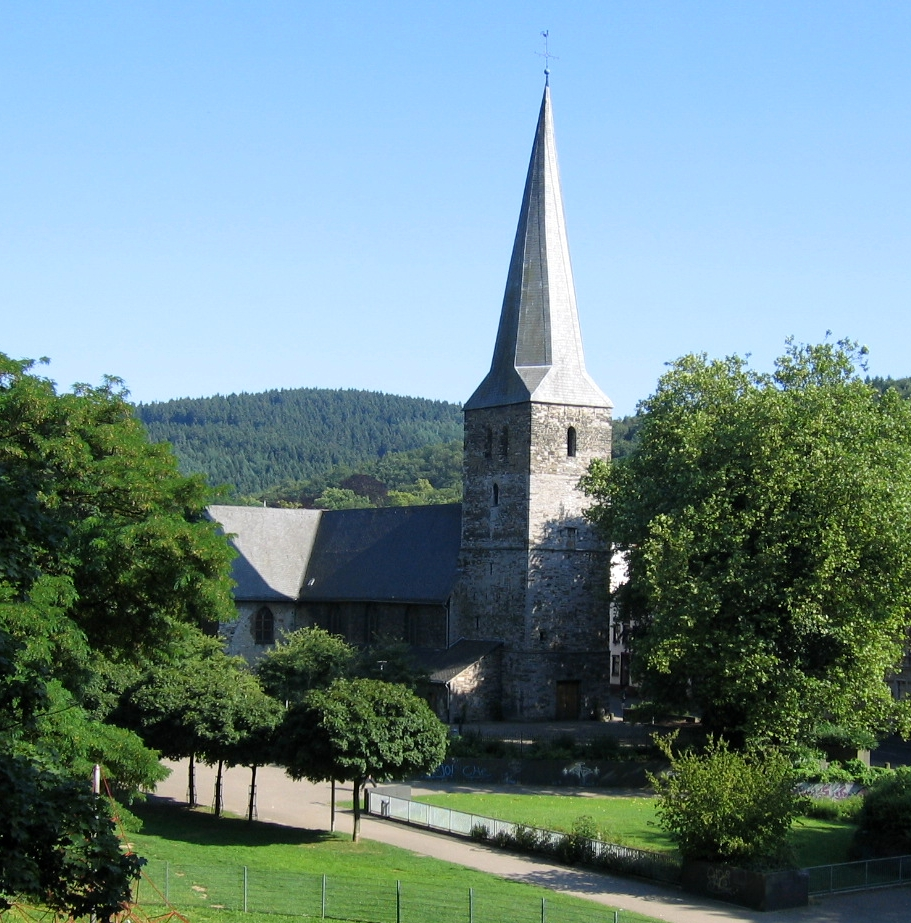
- Bauernkirche

- Coat of arms

- Location of Iserlohn within Märkischer Kreis district
- Interactive map of Iserlohn
- Location within Germany Location within North Rhine-Westphalia
- Coordinates: 51°23′N 07°40′E
- Country: Germany
- State: North Rhine-Westphalia
- Admin. region: Arnsberg
- District: Märkischer Kreis
- Subdivisions: 5

Government
  - Mayor (2020–30): Michael Joithe (Die Iserlohner)

Area
  - Total: 125.49 km^{2} (48.45 sq mi)
- Elevation: 494 m (1,621 ft)

Population (2025-12-31)
  - Total: 91,317
  - Density: 727.68/km^{2} (1,884.7/sq mi)
- Time zone: UTC+01:00 (CET)
  - Summer (DST): UTC+02:00 (CEST)
- Postal codes: 58636–58644
- Dialling codes: 02371 (Iserlohn); 02374 (Iserlohn-Letmathe); 02304 (Schwerte, Iserlohn-Hennen); 02352 (Altena, parts of Iserlohn-Kesbern); 02378 (Fröndenberg- Langschede, Iserlohn-Drüpplingsen)
- Vehicle registration: MK; IS until 1974; LS until 1979
- Website: www.iserlohn.de

Iserlohn (German: [iːzɐˈloːn]; Westphalian: Iserlaun) is a city in the Märkischer Kreis district, in North Rhine-Westphalia, in west-central Germany. It is the largest city by population and area within the district and the Sauerland region.

== Geography ==
Iserlohn is located at the north end of the Sauerland near the Ruhr.

== History ==
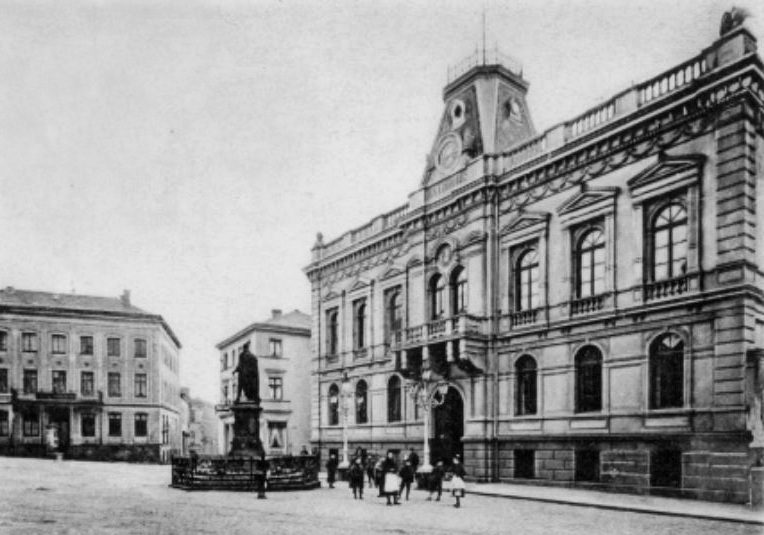
Old town hall in c. 1901

The Pancratius church (also called Bauernkirche) is believed to have been founded in around 985, but the first written document mentioning lon dates only from 1150. In 1237 the Count of the Mark gave Iserlohn municipal rights. In 1975 the city, which had been an urban district before, incorporated the surrounding ex-municipalities of Letmathe, Hennen, Sümmern and Kesbern, and became part of the district "Märkischer Kreis". As a larger mid-sized city, Iserlohn, however, still has a special status compared to most other municipalities in the district. This means that the city takes on tasks more usually performed by the district, such as social and youth affairs, hence it is comparable to an urban district.

== Population ==
Historical population

Year	Pop.	±% p.a.
1965	94,110	—
1970	96,930	+0.59%
1975	96,171	−0.16%
1980	93,825	−0.49%
1985	89,544	−0.93%
1990	96,314	+1.47%
1995	99,341	+0.62%

Year	Pop.	±% p.a.
2000	98,790	−0.11%
2005	97,285	−0.31%
2010	94,966	−0.48%
2015	93,537	−0.30%
2020	91,815	−0.37%
2025	91,317	−0.11%

Source: Landesdatabank Nordrhein-Westfalen

== Politics ==
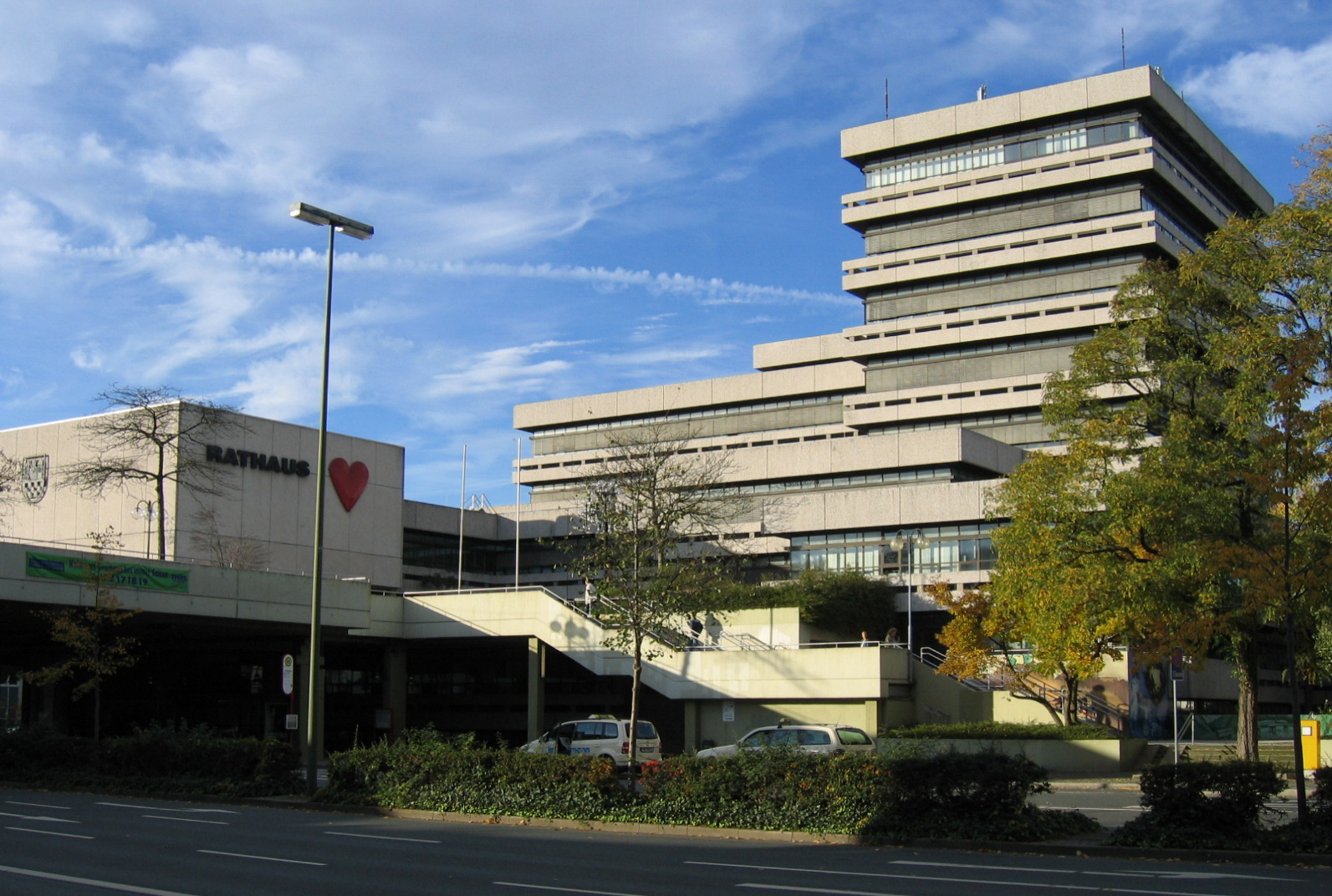
Town hall

=== Mayor ===
The current mayor of Iserlohn is Michael Joithe, a member of the voter group Die Iserlohner. The most recent mayoral election was held on 13 September 2020, with a runoff held on 27 September, and the results were as follows:

Candidate	Party	First round		Second round	
Candidate	Party	Votes	%	Votes	%
Eva-Barbara Kirchhoff	Christian Democratic Union	13,275	39.8	11,912	49.8
Michael Joithe	Die Iserlohner	5,273	15.8	12,007	50.2
Martin Luckert	Social Democratic Party	5,015	15.0		
Manuel Huff	The Left	2,864	8.6		
Martin Isbruch	Alliance 90/The Greens	2,692	8.1		
Daniel Bläsing	Alternative for Germany	1,608	4.8		
Claudio Vurro	Independent	1,521	4.6		
Hans Herbers	Independent Voters' Association	592	1.8		
Martin Radojcic	Independent	233	0.7		
Robert Gustävel	Independent	194	0.6		
Michael Klammt	Independent	129	0.4		
Valid votes		33,396	99.2	23,919	98.3
Invalid votes		279	0.8	419	1.7
Total		33,675	100.0	24,338	100.0
Electorate/voter turnout		72,958	46.2	72,849	33.4
Source: City of Iserlohn (1st round, 2nd round)

=== City council ===
The Iserlohn city council governs the city alongside the Mayor. The most recent city council election was held on 13 September 2020, and the results were as follows:

Party	Votes	%	±	Seats	±
Christian Democratic Union (CDU)	11,817	35.6	▼3.6	24	▲4
Social Democratic Party (SPD)	6,337	19.1	▼13.3	13	▼3
Die Iserlohner	4,397	13.2	New	9	New
Alliance 90/The Greens (Grüne)	3,713	11.2	▲4.3	8	▲5
The Left (Die Linke)	2,498	7.5	▲0.5	5	▲1
Alternative for Germany (AfD)	1,985	6.0	▼0.2	4	▲1
Free Democratic Party (FDP)	1,483	4.5	▲0.4	3	▲1
Independent Voters' Association (UWG)	960	2.9	▲0.7	2	▲1
Independent Radojcic	43	0.1	New	0	New
Valid votes	33,233	98.8			
Invalid votes	420	1.2			
Total	33,653	100.0		68	▲18
Electorate/voter turnout	72,958	46.1			
Source: City of Iserlohn Archived 27 September 2020 at the Wayback Machine

== Points of interest ==
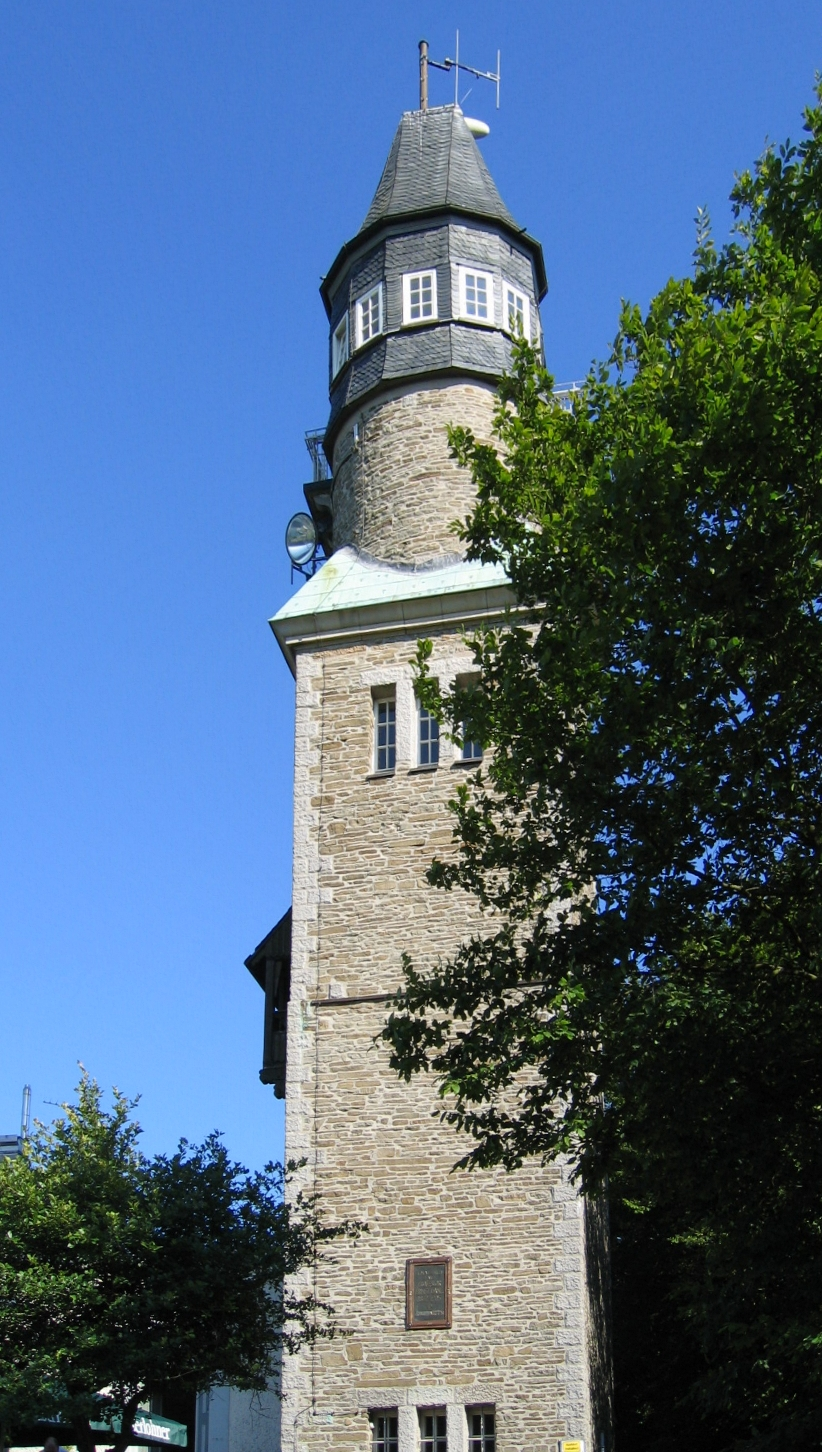
Danzturm

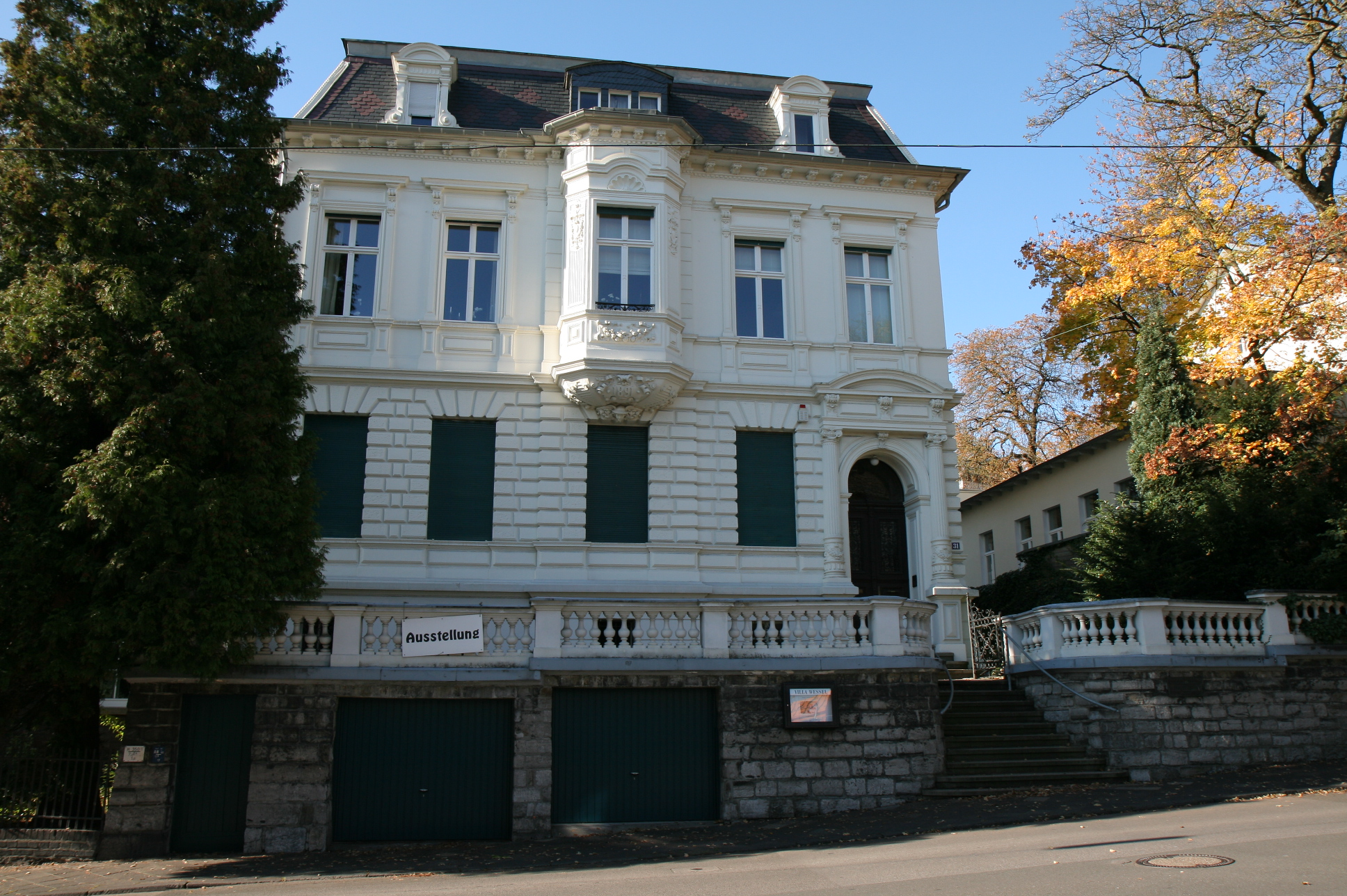
Villa Wessel

The Dechenhöhle caves were discovered in 1868 during the construction of the railway line Hagen-Iserlohn. 360 metres are accessible for visitors, and there are many stalactites and stalagmites in the cave.

The Danzturm, located on the southern hill overlooking the old city, is a landmark and featured on the logo of the local brewery (Iserlohner). The tower has views of the valley and surrounding hills and is open to the public with a small inn at the base.

In the 18th century, the town became known for its Iserlohn boxes, a form of tobacco or snuff box with an engraved or embossed lid that often featured an image of former Prussian King Frederick the Great.

== Sports ==
The city is home of the Iserlohn Roosters, a DEL (first division) ice hockey team. The Roosters joined the DEL in 2000 and developed from a low-budget team to a solid one that regularly competes for a Playoff-spot. The club plays its home games at the Eissporthalle Iserlohn, which holds 4,967 spectators. The original club, EC Deilinghofen, was founded in 1959 and went bankrupt in 1987. The second club, ECD Sauerland, existed from 1988 to 1994. In 1994, Iserlohner EC was founded.

There is also a basketball team, the Iserlohn Kangaroos, which plays in the third german division (Pro B).

== Education ==
Iserlohn has 15 elementary schools and 12 secondary schools (3 Gymnasien, 2Gesamtschule, 3 Realschulen, 5 Hauptschulen).

Two universities of applied sciences are also located in the city. The headquarters, together with a major branch, of the South Westphalia University of Applied Sciences (also: Fachhochschule Südwestfalen (FH SWF)) offering engineering and informatics programmes is located in the city centre on Alexanderhöhe.

== Schützenfest ==
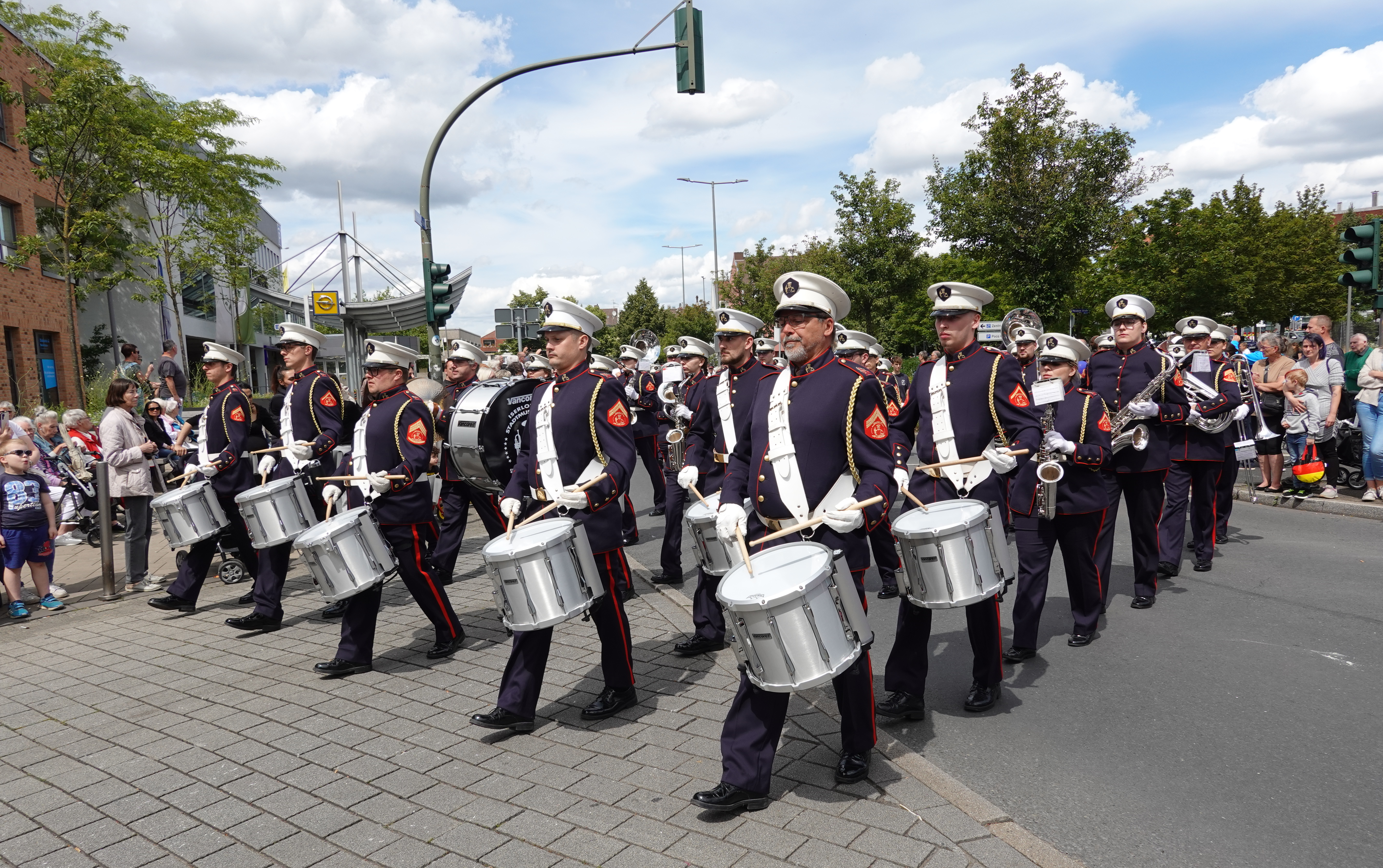
Schützenfest 2024

The Schützenfest is a famous festival which takes place every year, and is central to Iserlohner's cultural life – and the town's identity. It is held at the Parkhalle, Alexanderhöhe.

At the same time as the Shooters festival (Schützenfest) the Iserlohn Peace committee (FriedensPlenum) has held a 3-day free benefit music festival around the farmers church (Bauernkirche) since 1991.

== Coat of arms ==
Iserlohn's coat of arms features, in the middle, Saint Pancras (St. Pancratius), who is patron of the oldest church in Iserlohn. He is depicted between two towers of the historic city wall. The checked fess below the saint is derived from the arms of the Counts of the Mark.

== Twin towns – sister cities ==
Iserlohn is twinned with:

- Almelo, Netherlands (1954)
- Biel/Bienne, Switzerland (1959)
- Hall in Tirol, Austria (1967)
- Auchel, France (1975)
- Laventie, France (1975)
- Nyíregyháza, Hungary (1989)
- Novocherkassk, Russia (1990)
- Glauchau, Germany (1991)
- Chorzów, Poland (2004)

== Notable people ==
- Johann Stephan Pütter (1725–1807), Reichspublizist and teacher of state law
- Friedrich Soennecken (1848–1919), businessman, entrepreneur, inventor and graphic artist
- Alexander Pfänder (1870–1941), philosopher
- Karl Rasche (1892–1951), SS honor and rank leader for special use with the rank of Obersturmbannführer and board member and spokesman of the Dresdner Bank
- Wilhelm Wessel (1904–1971), painter
- Curt Rechel (1902–1973), Navy officer
- Walter Bosse (1904–1979), artist, designer, and potter
- Richard Friederich Arens (1919–2000), mathematician
- Gerd Roellecke (1927–2011), jurist and legal philosopher
- Aloys Kontarsky (1931–2017), pianist
- Alfons Kontarsky (1932–2010), pianist
- Bernhard Kontarsky (born 1937), conductor and pianist
- Jochen Busse (born 1941), actor and cabaret artist
- Helmut Neuhaus (born 1944), historian on Early modern period
- Albert Ernst (1912–1986) World War 2 tank ace, who saved the city by peacefully surrendering to US troops
- Harm Klueting (born 1949), Roman Catholic clergyman, historian, theologian and university lecturer
- Volker Fischer (born 1950), fencer
- Ulrich Walter (born 1954), astronaut
- Gordon Brown (1958–2020), sculptor
- Timothy Paul Evans (born 1962), British lieutenant-general and commander of the ARRC
- Matthias Mellinghaus (born 1965), rowing sportsman, film director and assistant director, Olympiasieger 1988
- Brian Glynn (born 1967), ice hockey player
- Marsha Wattanapanich (born 1970), Thai singer and actress
- Thorsten Schick (born 1971), politician (CDU)
- Markus Giesler (born 1976), consumer researcher
- Caput (born Soner Duman) (born 1983), rapper
- Thore Schölermann (born 1984), actor
- Dieter Orendorz (born 1992), ice hockey player
- David Beckmann (born 2000), car racing driver
- Monty Don (born 1955), gardener
- Kevin Orendorz (born 1995), professional ice hockey player
