= Matthias Stickler =

German historian

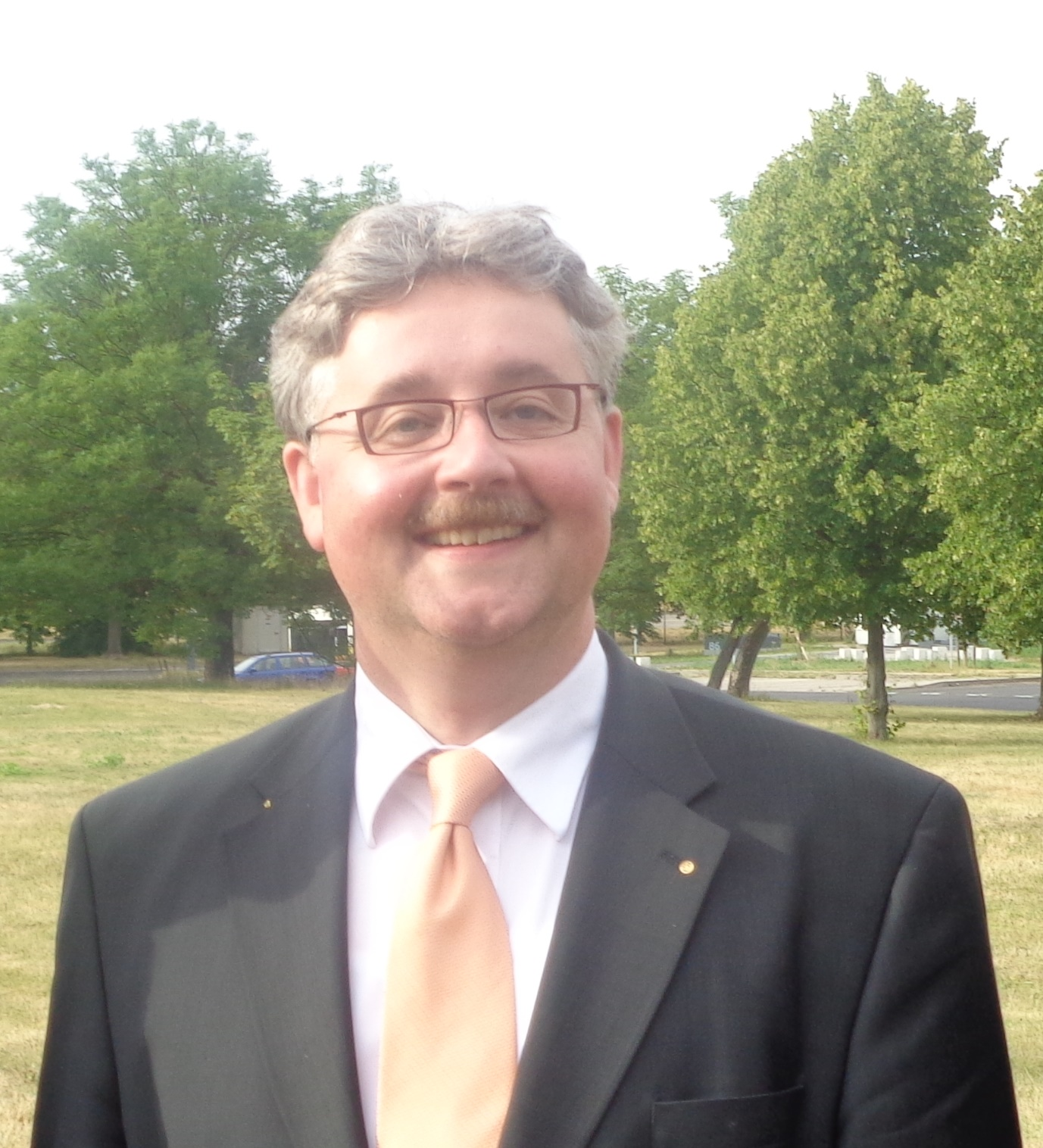
Matthias Stickler

Matthias Stickler (born 31 May 1967) is a German historian.

== Career ==
Born in Aschaffenburg, Stickler attended the Karl-Theodor-von-Dalberg-Gymnasium in Aschaffenburg and acquired there in 1986 the general university entrance qualification. From 1988 to 1993 he studied history, German studies and citizenship education for a chair at the University of Würzburg. In 1993 he became a member of the KDStV Gothia Würzburg in the Cartellverband. After the first Staatsexamen, he received his doctorate in 1997 with a dissertation with Harm-Hinrich Brandt. Afterwards, he was scientific assistant at the chair for Modern and Contemporary History II at the University of Würzburg with Harm-Hinrich Brandt and, from 2000, with Wolfgang Altgeld. He habilitated in 2003 and received the Venia legendi for more recent history. The Würzburg Faculty of Philosophy I appointed him in 2008 as representative for the Bologna Process.

in 2010 Stickler was appointed professor at the University of Würzburg. His main research areas are Flight and expulsion of Germans and their integration in West Germany. Other areas of interest are the Habsburg monarchy, genocide studies, German resistance to Nazism, University history and Students' History. On 1 October 2011 he was appointed scientific director of the Institut für Hochschulkunde. Since 2014 he has been supporting the Verein für corpsstudentische Geschichtsforschung with the publication of the yearbook Einst und Jetzt. He continues to lecture at the University of Bonn and the University of Mainz.

== Honorary offices ==
Minister of State Bernd Neumann appointed Stickler in 2009 to the scientific advisory board of the Foundation for Refuge, Expulsion and Reconciliation. The University of Würzburg appointed him in 2012 as a representative on the board of the Deutsche Gesellschaft für Hochschulkunde. He is a lecturer of the Hanns Seidel Foundation.

== Publications ==
- with Harm-Hinrich Brandt (ed.): Der Burschen Herrlichkeit. Geschichte und Gegenwart des studentischen Korporationswesens, Verlag Ferdinand Schöningh, Würzburg 1998 (Veröffentlichungen des Stadtarchivs Würzburg, volume 8), ISBN 3877177816.
- with Bernhard Grün, Johannes Schellakowsky and Peter Süß (ed.): Zwischen Korporation und Konfrontation. Beiträge zur Würzburger Universitäts- und Studentengeschichte, SH-Verlag, Cologne 1999, ISBN 3894980702.
- Portraits zur Geschichte des deutschen Widerstands (Historische Studien der Universität Würzburg, vol 6), Marie Leidorf Verlag, Rahden/Westfalen 2005, ISBN 3896468383.
- with Wolfgang Altgeld (ed.): "Italien am Main". Großherzog Ferdinand III. der Toskana als Kurfürst und Großherzog von Würzburg. (Historische Studien der Universität Würzburg, volume 7), Rahden/Westf. 2007, ISBN 3896468391.
- Neuanfang und Kontinuität: Würzburg in der Weimarer Republik. In Ulrich Wagner (ed.): Geschichte der Stadt Würzburg. Vol. III/1–2: Vom Übergang an Bayern bis zum 21. Jahrhundert. Thesis, Stuttgart 2007, ISBN 978-3-8062-1478-9, pp. 177–195 and 1268–1271.
- with Markus A. Denzel and Matthias Asche (ed.): Religiöse und konfessionelle Minderheiten als wirtschaftliche und geistige Eliten (16. bis frühes 20. Jahrhundert). (Deutsche Führungsschichten in der Neuzeit, vol. 28), Winkel Stiftung, St. Katharinen 2009, ISBN 978-3-89590-177-5.
- Bayerische Landeszentrale für politische Bildungsarbeit (ed.) / Matthias Asche, Thomas Nicklas, Matthias Stickler (coordination): "Was vom Alten Reiche blieb". Deutungen, Institutionen und Bilder des frühneuzeitlichen Heiligen Römischen Reiches Deutscher Nation im 19. und frühen 20. Jahrhundert, Munich 2011.
- Die Krise der Deutschen Burschenschaft. In the Frankfurter Allgemeine Zeitung dated 14 February 2014, Online version.
- with Michaela Neubert: Jahreskalender der Deutschen Gesellschaft für Hochschulkunde (DGfH).
  - 2016, mit dem thematischen Schwerpunkt "Das paritätische und jüdische Verbindungswesen". In Einst und Jetzt, vol. 61 (2016), pp. 383–418.
  - 2017, mit dem thematischen Schwerpunkt „Universitäten in Franken“. In Einst und Jetzt, vol. 62 (2017), pp. 383–418.
  - 2018, mit dem thematischen Schwerpunkt "150 Jahre Deutsche Landsmannschaft". In Einst und Jetzt, vol. 63 (2018), pp. 383–418.
