= Walter Ziegler =

German historian

Walter Ziegler (born 16 July 1937) is a German historian

== Life ==
Born in Liberec, Ziegler has been living in Bavaria since 1946. He attended Gymnasium in Munich. After his Abitur, he studied for the Lehramt in Freising and at the Ludwig-Maximilians-Universität München (LMU). He passed the first Staatsexamen in 1964, the second in 1966. After his doctorate and his habilitation with Andreas Kraus with the work Studien zum Staatshaushalt Bayerns in der zweiten Hälfte des 15. Jahrhunderts at the University of Regensburg in 1980, he received a professorship for modern history and regional history as well as didactics of history at the University of Würzburg. From 1989 until his retirement in 2002, Ziegler taught Bavarian regional history with a special focus on modern times at the Institute for Bavarian History of the LMU Munich as successor to Andreas Kraus. Since 1994, Ziegler has been a full member of the Bavarian Academy of Sciences and the Swabian Research Foundation. In 2001, he was awarded the Bavarian Order of Merit.

The focus of his academic work is the history of the State, especially of Bavaria and southern Germany, in the late Middle Ages and early modern times. Another focus of his research is Reformation and Counter-Reformation. He has also published several works on the contemporary history of Bavaria in the 20th century, especially on the period of National Socialism and displacement.

== Writings ==
Monographs

- Hitler und Bayern. Beobachtungen zu ihrem Verhältnis. (Bayerische Akademie der Wissenschaften. Philosophisch-Historische Klasse. Sitzungsberichte. Jg. 2004, H. 4). Beck, Munich 2004, ISBN 3-7696-1628-6.
- Studien zum Staatshaushalt Bayerns in der zweiten Hälfte des 15. Jahrhunderts. Die regulären Kammereinkünfte des Herzogtums Niederbayern 1450–1500. Beck, Munich 1981, ISBN 3-406-07878-8 (in the meantime: Regensburg, Universität, Habilitations-Schrift, 1976).

Editions

- with Anton Schindling: Die Territorien des Reichs im Zeitalter der Reformation und Konfessionalisierung. 7 volumes. Aschendorff, Münster 1989–1997;
  - Vol. 1: Der Südosten (Katholisches Leben und Kirchenreform im Zeitalter der Glaubensspaltung. 49). 1989, ISBN 3-402-02970-7;
  - Vol. 2: Der Nordosten (Katholisches Leben und Kirchenreform im Zeitalter der Glaubensspaltung. 50). 1990, ISBN 3-402-02971-5;
  - Vol. 3: Der Nordwesten (Katholisches Leben und Kirchenreform im Zeitalter der Glaubensspaltung. 51). 1991, ISBN 3-402-02972-3;
  - Vol. 4: Mittleres Deutschland (Katholisches Leben und Kirchenreform im Zeitalter der Glaubensspaltung. 52). 1992, ISBN 3-402-02973-1;
  - Vol. 5: Der Südwesten (Katholisches Leben und Kirchenreform im Zeitalter der Glaubensspaltung. 53). 1993, ISBN 3-402-02974-X;
  - Vol. 6: Nachträge (Katholisches Leben und Kirchenreform im Zeitalter der Glaubensspaltung. 56). 1996, ISBN 3-402-02977-4;
  - Vol. 7: Bilanz – Forschungsperspektiven – Register (Katholisches Leben und Kirchenreform im Zeitalter der Glaubensspaltung. 57). 1997, ISBN 3-402-02978-2.
- with Hermann Rumschötel: Staat und Gaue in der NS-Zeit. Bayern 1933–1945.(Zeitschrift für bayerische Landesgeschichte. Beiheft. Reihe B, 21). Beck, Munich 2004, ISBN 3-406-10662-5.
- Die Vertriebenen vor der Vertreibung. Die Heimatländer der deutschen Vertriebenen im 19. und 20. Jahrhundert.2 vol. Iudicium, Munich 1999, ISBN 3-89129-046-2.
