= Gordon Brown (sculptor) =

German sculptor (1958–2020)

- Born: 7 April 1958; Iserlohn, West Germany
- Died: 24 October 2020 (aged 62); Iserlohn, Germany
- Occupation: Sculptor

Gordon Brown (7 April 1958 – 24 October 2020) was a German sculptor.

== Biography ==
Born to a Canadian father and German mother, Brown spent his childhood in British Columbia and West Germany. He learned carpentry and woodcarving and was a self-taught artist from 1985 to 1992. He studied design and sculpture at the Dortmund University of Applied Sciences and Arts. He then taught at the school from 1997 to 1999. He opened his own workshop in Hamm in 1997. He lived there alongside author Marion Gay.

Brown designed his works in series. His best known and most developed series was Das Leben der Boote, which he started in 1995. It "served him in a general way to make things aware that are changing". In general, his works were defined by "clarity, concentration and lyrical beauty".

== Books ==
- Das Leben der Boote. Feldarbeiten (1999)
- Skulptur – Räume (2000)
- Holz-Gezeiten (2008)
