= Friedrich Hermann Schubert =

German historian

Friedrich Hermann Schubert (26 August 1925 – 30 June 1973) was a German historian.

== Life ==
Schubert was born in Dresden in 1925 as the son of the Dresden professor of architecture and architect Otto Schubert and the teacher Veronika née Strüver, whose parents were well established in the high society of Dresden; this was especially true of his grandfather, who was a model for him as a lawyer. His paternal grandfather is the sculptor Hermann Schubert. Schubert attended the Vitzthum-Gymnasium Dresden, which he completed in February 1944 with the Abitur. He escaped being drafted into the Wehrmacht because of an illness that took him two years. In 1946, however, he began studying history and economics at the Ludwig-Maximilians-Universität München. In 1952, he was awarded a doctorate with a study on Ludwig Camerarius by Franz Schnabel. This work, with Ludwig Camerarius, who was born in Nuremberg but worked in Palatinate and Swedish services, represented a picture of his life that still showed intellectual horizons even during the Thirty Years' War.

Schubert, who had been working for the Historical Commission of the Bavarian Academy of Sciences since 1952, began a major study of the older German Reichstag in the image of journalism between 1495 and 1648 after the printing of his dissertation. With this work, which like the dissertation opened up completely new and extraordinarily broad horizons, he habilitated at the Ludwig-Maximilians-Universität München in 1959. In the following years, he revised and supplemented it considerably until it was published in 1966.

In 1962, Schubert became a dietary lecturer at the Ludwig-Maximilians-Universität München, where he also provided the chair of his great patron Franz Schnabel. Only one year later, this time inspired by Carl Dietrich Erdmann, he was appointed Professor of Medieval and Modern History at Kiel University. After refusing a call to the University of Hamburg, he took over the chair of Medieval and Modern History at the University of Frankfurt am Main held by Otto Vossler in 1968. From 1952 to 1963, he was also editor of Neue Deutsche Biographie. Among his academic students were among others Sigrid Jahns, Johannes Kunisch and Volker Press. Gerhard Menk began his doctorate with Schubert.

Schubert belonged to the rediscoverers of the older German Reichstag as a weighty institution in the European environment and, incidentally, also of the work of the Calvinist state theorist Johannes Althusius. Like Franz Schnabel, Schubert was a representative of the German new humanism, which had a strong impact in Munich in the immediate post-war period. Schubert not only had a Western and liberal understanding of history, but also made a significant contribution to placing the older German constitutional institutions at the centre of the common European intellectual tradition throughout the early modern period. A major work on European monarchy history has unfortunately been lost.

Schubert was a member of the Bund Freiheit der Wissenschaft. During the West German student movement he was exposed to the protests of leftist students, who mistakenly identified him as an exponent of a highly conservative educational ideal and professorship. He successfully defended himself against them in court, but was unable to convince them of his fundamental liberal views.

In the summer of 1973, Schubert chose committed suicide at the age of 47 in Kiel, at that time dean of the department.

== Memberships ==
- 1963: Associate member of the Historische Kommission bei der Bayerischen Akademie der Wissenschaften
- 1965: Full member of the Historical Commission at the Bavarian Academy of Sciences and Humanities

== Publications ==
- Ludwig Camerarius (1573–1651) – eine Biographie. Die Pfälzische Exilregierung im Dreißigjährigen Krieg. Ein Beitrag zur Geschichte des politischen Protestantismus. Mit Beiträgen zu Leben und Werk des Verfassers. Edited by Anton Schindling with contribution by Markus Gerstmeier. Aschendorff, Münster 2013, ISBN 978-3-402-13018-6.
- Die deutschen Reichstage in der Staatslehre der frühen Neuzeit. Vandenhoeck & Ruprecht, Göttingen 1966. Digitalisat at the Digi20-Projekt of the Bavarian State Library
- Die pfälzische Exilregierung im Dreissigjährigen Krieg : ein Beitrag zur Geschichte des politischen Protestantismus
- Ludwig Camerarius <1573-1651> als Staatsmann im Dreissigjährigen Krieg..

== Literature ==
- Erich Angermann: "Ein abgebrochenes Lebenswerk. Zum Tode Friedrich Hermann Schuberts." In Historische Zeitschrift. Vol. 218, issue 2, April 1974, pp. 354–363 (Numerised at JSTOR).
- Karl Otmar von Aretin: Friedrich Hermann Schubert (1925–1973). Rede am 24. Oktober 1973 im Historischen Seminar der Johann Wolfgang Goethe-Universität, Frankfurt (Frankfurter historische Abhandlungen Beiheft 1). Steiner, Wiesbaden 1974.
- Gerhard Menk: "Friedrich Hermann Schubert (1925–1973). Vom Schüler Franz Schnabels zum präsumtiven Erben Gerhard Ritters." In Friedrich Hermann Schubert: Ludwig Camerarius (1573–1651). Eine Biographie. 2nd edition. Aschendorff, Münster 2013, pp. 609–684.
- Anton Schindling (2007). "Schubert, Friedrich Hermann". Neue Deutsche Biographie (in German). Vol. 23. Berlin: Duncker & Humblot. pp. 615–616. (full text online).
