= Heinz Stübig =

German author and university teacher (1939–2021)

Heinz Stübig (12 June 1939 – 7 April 2021) was a German pedagogue.

== Life ==
Born in Braunschweig, Stübig studied German studies, history and educational science at the Philipps-Universität Marburg and the University of Hamburg from 1960 to 1966, after which he was a research assistant (most recently Academic Superintendent) at the Marburg Research Centre for comparative education. In 1970 he was accepted Dr. phil. by Wolfgang Klafki with the dissertation Armee und Nation. Die pädagogisch-politischen Motive der preußischen Heeresreform 1807–1814. His Habilitation followed in 1982.

Later he worked at the Institute for Educational Science and the Institute for School Pedagogy. He was first Privatdozent, then außerplanmäßiger Professor for Educational Science; his work focused on Comparative Education and Historical Pedagogy. He retired in 2004. He published numerous books.

== Writings ==
=== Monographs ===
- Armee und Nation. Die pädagogisch-politischen Motive der preußischen Heeresreform 1807–1814. (Europäische Hochschulschriften. Reihe 11, Pädagogik. Vol. 5). Peter Lang, Frankfurt, 1971.
- Vergleichende Daten und Analysen zur Bildungspolitik in England. (Marburger Beiträge zur vergleichenden Erziehungswissenschaft und Bildungsforschung. Vol. 7). Minerva-Publikation, Munich 1980, ISBN 3-597-10202-6.
- Pädagogik und Politik in der preussischen Reformzeit. Studien zur Nationalerziehung und Pestalozzi-Rezeption (Studien und Dokumentationen zur deutschen Bildungsgeschichte. Vol. 21). Beltz, Weinheim among others 1982, ISBN 3-407-65622-X.
- Aspekte der englischen Sekundarschulreform. Leistungsdifferenzierung, Fächerangebot und Curriculumplanung. (Texte - Dokumente - Berichte zum Bildungswesen ausgewählter Industriestaaten. Issue 32). Minerva-Publikation, Munich 1983, ISBN 3-597-10477-0.
- Scharnhorst. Die Reform des preussischen Heeres (Persönlichkeit und Geschichte. Vol. 131). Muster-Schmidt, Göttingen among others 1988, ISBN 3-7881-0131-8.
- Bildungspolitik in England (1975–1985). Vergleichende Daten und Analysen (Marburger Beiträge zur vergleichenden Erziehungswissenschaft und Bildungsforschung. Band 22). Minerva-Publikation, Munich 1989, ISBN 3-597-10564-5.
- Bildung, Militär und Gesellschaft in Deutschland. Studien zur Entwicklung im 19. Jahrhundert (Studien und Dokumentationen zur deutschen Bildungsgeschichte. Vol. 54). Böhlau, Cologne among others 1994, ISBN 3-412-08793-9.
- Nationalerziehung. Pädagogische Antworten auf die "deutsche Frage" im 19. Jahrhundert. Wochenschau-Verlag, Schwalbach 2006, ISBN 3-89974-230-3.
- Gerhard von Scharnhorst. Preußischer General und Heeresreformer. Studien zu seiner Biographie und Rezeption (Geschichte, Forschung und Wissenschaft. Vol. 34). Lit, Berlin among others 2009, ISBN 978-3-643-10255-3.
- Friedrich Wilhelm August Fröbel. Beiträge zur Biographie und Wirkungsgeschichte eines "verdienten deutschen Pädagogen". Projektverlag, Bochum 2010, ISBN 978-3-89733-220-1.
- Zwischen Reformzeit und Reichsgründung. Studien zur Entwicklung der preußisch-deutschen Armee im 19. Jahrhundert. Berliner Wissenschafts-Verlag, Berlin 2012, ISBN 978-3-8305-3140-1.
- Mars und Minerva. Militär und Bildung in Deutschland seit dem ausgehenden 18. Jahrhundert. Gesammelte Beiträge. Tectum, Marburg 2015, ISBN 978-3-8288-3620-4.

=== Publications ===
- with Wilfried Hendricks: Zwischen Theorie und Praxis. Marburger Kolloquium zur Didaktik. Kronberg: Athenäum 1977, ISBN 3-7610-8600-8.
- Bibliographie Wolfgang Klafki. Verzeichnis der Veröffentlichungen und betreuten Hochschulschriften 1952–1992. Edited by Madeleine A. Kinsella, Weinheim among others: Beltz 1992, ISBN 3-407-34070-2.
- with Peter Baumgart, Bernhard R. Kroener: Die preußische Armee zwischen Ancien Régime und Reichsgründung. Paderborn among others: Schöningh 2008, ISBN 978-3-506-75660-2.
- with Christian Ritzi: Wolfgang Klafki. Kategoriale Bildung. Konzeption und Praxis reformpädagogischer Schularbeit zwischen 1948 und 1952. Bad Heilbrunn: Klinkhardt 2013, ISBN 978-3-7815-1936-7.
- with Hans Christoph Berg, Bodo Hildebrand and Frauke Stübig: Renate Riemeck: Klassiker der Pädagogik von Comenius bis Reichwein. Marburger Sommervorlesungen 1981/1982/1983 mit Quellentexten. Marburg: Tectum 2014, ISBN 978-3-8288-3431-6.
- with Karl-Heinz Braun und Frauke Stübig: Erziehungswissenschaftliches Denken und pädagogisch-politisches Engagement. Wolfgang Klafki weiterdenken. Wiesbaden: Springer VS 2018, ISBN 978-3-658-18594-7.
- with Karl-Heinz Braun und Frauke Stübig: Wolfgang Klafki: Allgemeine Erziehungswissenschaft. Systematische und historische Abhandlungen. Wiesbaden: Springer VS 2019, ISBN 978-3-658-23165-1.
- with Karl-Heinz Braun and Frauke Stübig: Wolfgang Klafki: Pädagogisch-politische Porträts. Wiesbaden: Springer VS 2019, ISBN 978-3-658-26751-3.
