= Thorsten Schick (politician) =

German politician (born 1971)

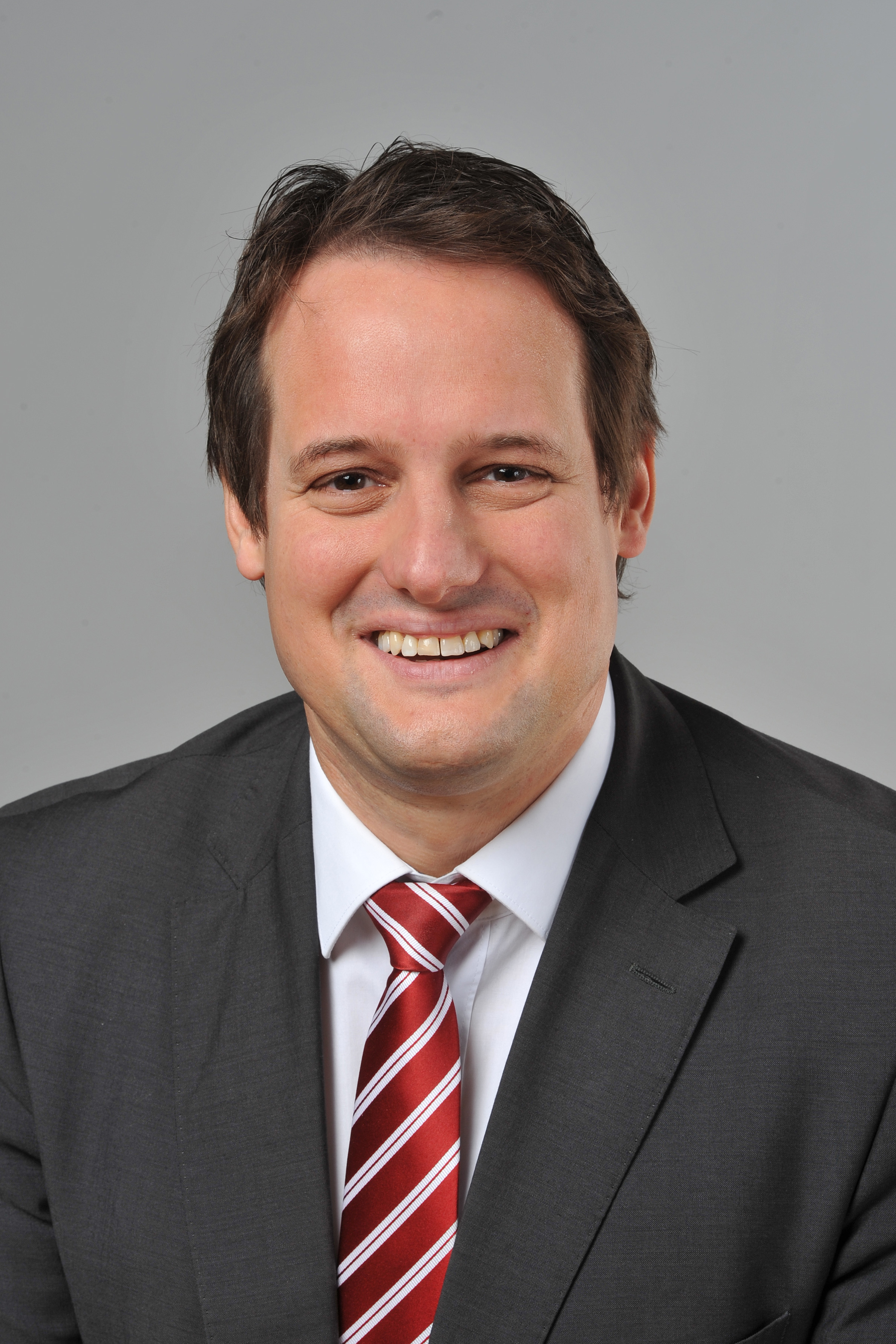
- Schick in 2013

Member of the Landtag of North Rhine-Westphalia
- Incumbent
- Assumed office 13 May 2012
- Constituency: Märkischer Kreis I (2017–present)
- In office 8 June 2005 – 9 June 2010
- Succeeded by: Michael Scheffler
- Constituency: Märkischer Kreis I

Personal details
- Born: 2 September 1971 (age 54) Iserlohn
- Party: Christian Democratic Union

Thorsten Schick (born 2 September 1971 in Iserlohn) is a German politician. He has been a member of the Landtag of North Rhine-Westphalia since 2012, having previously served from 2005 to 2010. He has served as group leader of the Christian Democratic Union since 2022.
