= Iserlohn box =

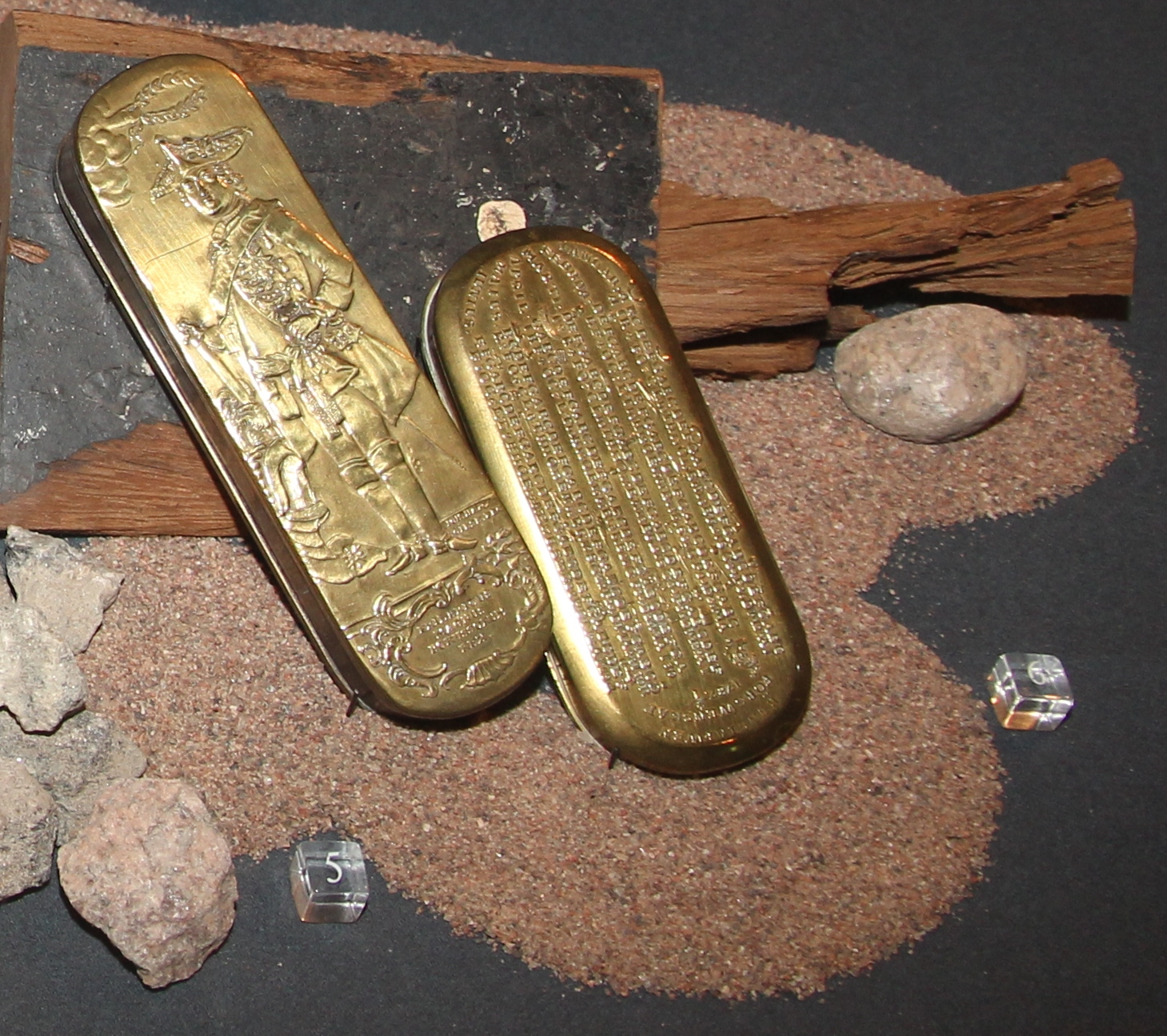
An 18th century Iserlohn box (left).

An Iserlohn box is a copper or brass box for snuff or tobacco which typically has an engraved, chased or embossed lid depicting an allegorical or rustic scene or an image of Frederick the Great. The boxes date from 18th century Iserlohn in Westphalia and the Netherlands.
