= Matthias Asche =

German historian

Matthias Asche (born 16 May 1969) is a German historian specialising in the early modern period.

== Life ==
Born in Hamburg, from 1988 to 1993, Asche studied History, Political Science and German at the University of Osnabrück, the University of Vienna and the University of Rostock. From 1995 to 1997 he was Research Assistant at the University of Tübingen. In 1997, he won his Doctorate there with the work From 1997 to 2003 Asche was a research assistant at Tübingen. In 2003 he received a doctorate for his dissertation Neusiedler im verheerten Land. Kriegsfolgenbewältigung, Migrationssteuerung und Konfessionspolitik im Zeichen des Landeswiederaufbaus. Die Mark Brandenburg nach den Kriegen des 17. Jahrhunderts habilitiert. From 2003 to 2011 he worked as Hochschuldozent at the University of Tübingen, interrupted by chair substitutions at the University of Jena in the winter semester 2005/06 and in the academic year 2007/08. An Außerplanmäßiger Professor since 2011, he has been Akademischer Rat auf Zeit.

In the summer semester 2015 and winter semester 2015/16 Asche represented the chair "Cultural History of the Modern Era" at the University of Potsdam. Since the winter semester 2016/17, he has held the professorship for "General History of the Early Modern Period" at the University of Potsdam.

Asche is a member of the catholic student fraternities A.V. Widukind Osnabrück, AV Cheruskia Tübingen and K.Ö.St.V. Nibelungia Wien.

== Awards ==
- 2006: Research Promotion Prize of the University of Tübingen, donated by the Commerzbank Foundation (for the habilitation thesis).

== Writings ==
- ed. with Marco Kollenberg, Antje Zeiger: Halb Europa in Brandenburg. Der Dreißigjährige Krieg und seine Folgen. Lukas Verlag, Berlin 2020, ISBN 978-3-86732-323-9.
- ed. with Werner Buchholz and Anton Schindling:. Scripta Mercaturae, Sankt Katharinen 2009, ISBN 978-3-89590-177-5. Die baltischen Lande im Zeitalter der Reformation und Konfessionalisierung. Estland, Livland, Ösel, Ingermanland, Kurland und Lettgallen. Stadt, Land und Konfession 1500–1721. 4 parts. Aschendorff, Münster 2009–2012, DNB-IDN 996992375.
- ed. with Markus A. Denzel und Matthias Stickler: Religiöse und konfessionelle Minderheiten als wirtschaftliche und geistige Eliten (16. bis frühes 20. Jahrhundert). Scripta Mercaturae, Sankt Katharinen 2009, ISBN 978-3-89590-177-5.
- ed. with Michael Herrmann, Ulrike Ludwig und Anton Schindling: Krieg, Militär und Migration in der Frühen Neuzeit. Lit, Berlin 2008, ISBN 978-3-8258-9863-2.
- Neusiedler im verheerten Land. Kriegsfolgenbewältigung, Migrationssteuerung und Konfessionspolitik im Zeichen des Landeswiederaufbaus. Die Mark Brandenburg nach den Kriegen des 17. Jahrhunderts. Aschendorff, Münster 2006, ISBN 3-402-00417-8 (Habilitation thesis, University of Tübingen, 2003).
- ed. with Anton Schindling: Dänemark, Norwegen und Schweden im Zeitalter der Reformation und Konfessionalisierung. Nordische Königreiche und Konfession 1500 bis 1660. Aschendorff, Münster 2003, ISBN 3-402-02983-9.
- ed. with Anton Schindling: Das Strafgericht Gottes. Kriegserfahrungen und Religion im Heiligen Römischen Reich Deutscher Nation im Zeitalter des Dreissigjährigen Krieges: Beiträge aus dem Tübinger Sonderforschungsbereich „Kriegserfahrungen – Krieg und Gesellschaft in der Neuzeit“. Aschendorff, Münster 2001; 2nd, reviewed edition 2002, ISBN 3-402-05910-X.
- Von der reichen hansischen Bürgeruniversität zur armen mecklenburgischen Landeshochschule. Das regionale und soziale Besucherprofil der Universitäten Rostock und Bützow in der Frühen Neuzeit (1500–1800). Steiner, Stuttgart 2000, ISBN 3-515-07323-X Dissertation, University of Tübingen, 1997); 2nd, reviewed edition 2010, ISBN 978-3-515-09264-7.
