= Peter Baumgart =

German historian of modern age

Peter Baumgart (born 7 September 1931) is a German historian.

== Life ==
Born in Berlin, Baumgart was promoted D. ph in 1956 in historical thinking at the Free University of Berlin with a work supervised by Carl Hinrichs on Zinzendorf. He was Hinrichs' research assistant at the Friedrich-Meinecke-Institut and habilitated in 1964 on the former Braunschweig-wolfenbüttelsche University of Helmstedt. The habilitation thesis remained unpublished. From 1967 until his retirement, Baumgart taught as full professor of modern history at the University of Würzburg.

His main research interests are the history of education and universities in the early modern period and the history of Prussia and its provinces. He is considered an expert on (Brandenburg) Prussian statehood and culture. About the Soldier King Baumgart wrote a biography in the anthology about Prussia's ruler. On the occasion of his 75th birthday in 2006, the numerous articles on the history of universities in the confessional age published between 1961 and 1994 were collected and published.

Baumgart is a member of the executive committee of the Preußische Historische Kommission sowie der Historische Kommission für Schlesien

== Writings ==
Monographs

- Zinzendorf als Wegbereiter historischen Denkens. (Historische Studien. H. 381). Matthiesen, Lübeck among others 1960; (plus dissertation under the title Spiritualismus und Pietismus bei Zinzendorf als Wegbereiter historischen Denkens, FU Berlin)
- Universitäten im konfessionellen Zeitalter. Gesammelte Beiträge. Aschendorff, Münster 2006, ISBN 978-3-402-03817-8.
- Brandenburg-Preußen unter dem Ancien Régime. Ausgewählte Abhandlungen. Edited by Frank-Lothar Kroll, Duncker & Humblot, Berlin 2009, ISBN 978-3-428-12827-3.

Editions

- Bildungspolitik in Preussen zur Zeit des Kaiserreichs.(Preussen in der Geschichte. Vol. 1). Klett-Cotta, Stuttgart 1980, ISBN 3-12-914110-3.
- Vierhundert Jahre Universität Würzburg. Eine Festschrift.(Quellen und Beiträge zur Geschichte der Universität Würzburg. Vol 6). Im Auftrag der Bayrischen Julius-Maximilians-Universität, Degener, Neustadt an der Aisch 1982, ISBN 3-7686-9062-8.
- Ständetum und Staatsbildung in Brandenburg-Preussen. Ergebnisse einer internationalen Fachtagung (Studies presented to the International Commission for the History of Representative and Parliamentary Institutions. 66). Mit einem Geleitwort von Otto Büsch, de Gruyter, Berlin among others 1983, ISBN 3-11-009517-3.
- Expansion und Integration. Zur Eingliederung neugewonnener Gebiete in den preussischen Staat (Neue Forschungen zur brandenburg-preußischen Geschichte. Bd. 5). Böhlau, Cologne among others. 1984, ISBN 3-412-06683-4.
- Kontinuität und Wandel. Schlesien zwischen Österreich und Preussen. Ergebnisse eines Symposions in Würzburg vom 29. bis 31. Oktober 1987 (Schlesische Forschungen. Vol. 4). Thorbecke, Sigmaringen 1990, ISBN 3-7995-5854-3.
- Lebensbilder bedeutender Würzburger Professoren (Quellen und Beiträge zur Geschichte der Universität Würzburg. Vol. 8). Degener, Neustadt an der Aisch 1995, ISBN 3-7686-9137-3.
- Michael Ignaz Schmidt (1736–1794) in seiner Zeit. Der aufgeklärte Theologe, Bildungsreformer und "Historiker der Deutschen" aus Franken in neuer Sicht. Beiträge zu einem Symposion vom 27. bis 29. Oktober 1994 in Würzburg (Quellen und Beiträge zur Geschichte der Universität Würzburg. Vol. 9). Degener, Neustadt an der Aisch 1996, ISBN 3-7686-9143-8.
- Die Universität Würzburg in den Krisen der ersten Hälfte des 20. Jahrhunderts. Biographisch-systematische Studien zu ihrer Geschichte zwischen dem Ersten Weltkrieg und dem Neubeginn 1945 (Quellen und Forschungen zur Geschichte des Bistums und Hochstifts Würzburg. Vol. 58). Im Auftrag der Kommission für die Geschichte der Bayerischen Julius-Maximilians-Universität Würzburg, Schöningh, Würzburg 2002, ISBN 3-87717-064-1.
- with Bernhard R. Kroener, Heinz Stübig: Die preußische Armee zwischen Ancien Régime und Reichsgründung. Schöningh, Paderborn among others 2008, ISBN 978-3-506-75660-2.
- Politische Correspondenz Friedrichs des Großen. Für die Preußische Historische Kommission. Mehrbändig, Duncker & Humblot, Berlin 1879 ff.

== Literature ==
- Peter Herde, Anton Schindling (ed.): Beiträge zur Bildungsgeschichte. Gewidmet Peter Baumgart anläßlich seines 65. Geburtstages. (Quellen und Forschungen zur Geschichte des Bistums und Hochstifts Würzburg. Vol. 53). Schöningh, Würzburg 1998, ISBN 3-87717-057-9.
