= Ulrich von Hehl =

German historian (born 1947)

Ulrich von Hehl (born 19 October 1947) is a German historian and university professor. He has published extensively, mostly on German history in the twentieth century, and with a particular focus on the role played by the Roman Catholic church and its interaction with politics.

== Life ==
Ulrich von Hehl was born into a Roman Catholic family in Viersen, a manufacturing town in the extreme west of Germany's British occupation zone located between the Dutch frontier and Düsseldorf. Between 1958 and 1959 he attended the Gymnasium (school) in Viersen, before moving on to the Moltkeplatz Gymnasium (school) at Krefeld roughly 15 miles (24 km) to the northeast of Viersen, which he attended till successfully completing his school career in 1966. There followed a period of military service after which, between 1969 and 1974, he studied History and Germanistics at the University of Bonn. His doctorate followed in 1977. His dissertation concerned the Catholic Church and National Socialism in the Archbishopric of Cologne during the twelve Nazi years. and was supervised by Konrad Repgen. He pursued a career in history for a period, heading up the Commission for Contemporary History in Bonn. with which he has been associated since 1977. He received his habilitation (higher academic qualification) in 1987, still from Bonn University, for a piece of biographical work on Chancellor Wilhelm Marx (1863-1946). In 1989/90 he briefly occupied a teaching chair at the University of Augsburg. Moving east, between 1992 and 2013 he held a professorship in contemporary and latest history at Leipzig University, retiring in April 2013.

== Work ==
Ulrich von Hehl's research focus covers Catholicism in Germany, the "Weimar" period and aspects of the Nazi years. His various memberships include a place on the Academic Advisory Board of the Haus der Geschichte der Bundesrepublik Deutschland ("House of the History of the Federal Republic of Germany"). He is also deputy board chairman of the Horst Springer Foundation for Contemporary and Latest History in Saxony. He has been involved in preparing the fourth volume, covering the period from 1914, of a four volume History of the City of Leipzig, produced in 2015 to celebrate the city's anniversary.
