= Kevin Orendorz =

German ice hockey player (born 1995)

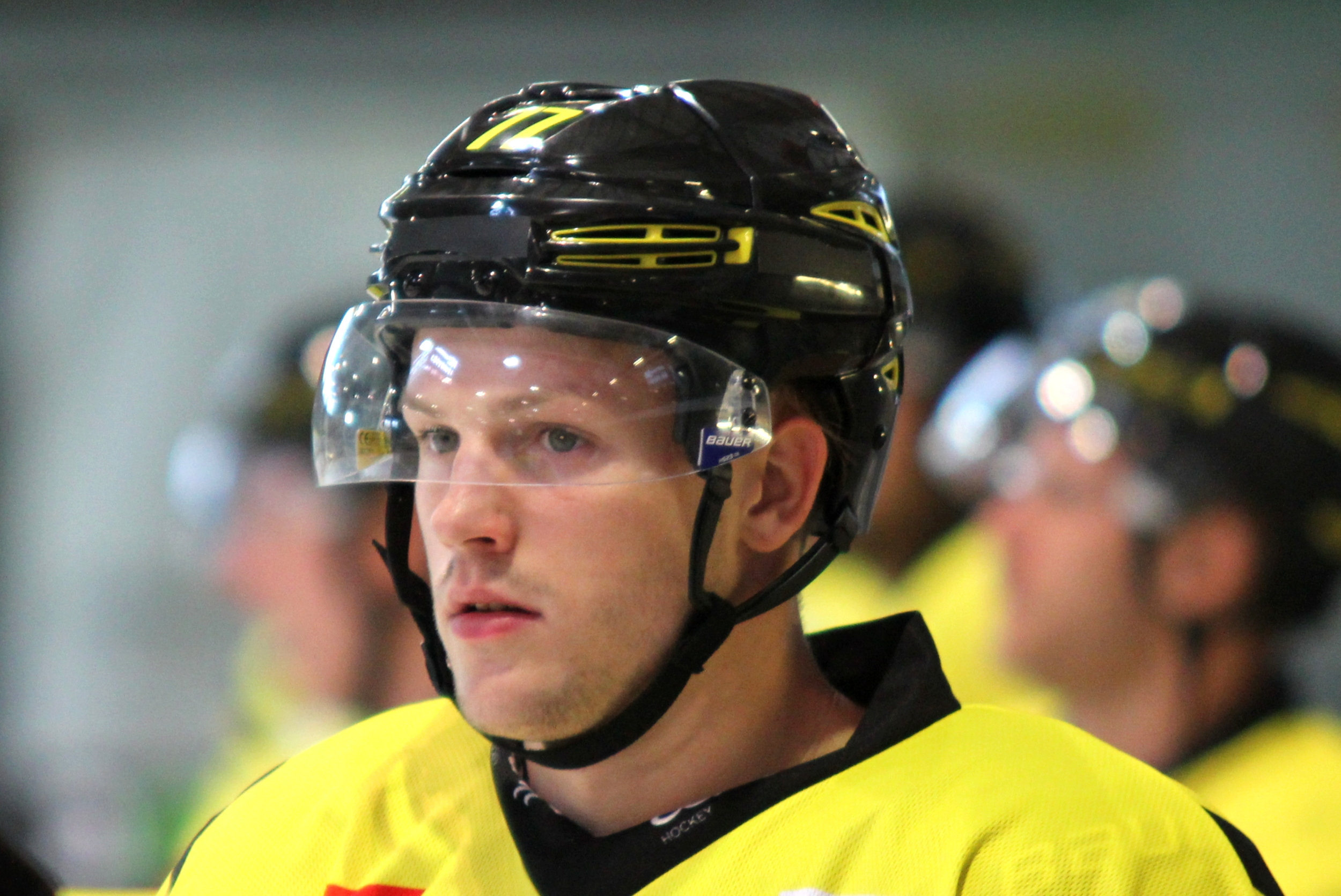
- Born: February 24, 1995 (age 31) Iserlohn, Germany
- Height: 6 ft 2 in (188 cm)
- Weight: 187 lb (85 kg; 13 st 5 lb)
- Position: Winger
- Shoots: Left
- DEL team Former teams: Free Agent; Krefeld Pinguine
- Playing career: 2012–present

Kevin Orendorz (born February 24, 1995) is a German professional ice hockey player. He is currently an unrestricted free agent who most recently played with Krefeld Pinguine of the German Deutsche Eishockey Liga.

== Playing career ==
Orendorz made his Deutsche Eishockey Liga debut playing with Krefeld Pinguine during the 2012–13 DEL season. After spending his first six professional seasons under contract with Krefeld Pinguine, Orendorz left as a free agent following the 2017–18 campaign.
