= Otto Hufnagel =

German teacher and politician

Otto Julius Hufnagel (4 October 1885 – 11 November 1944) was a German teacher and politician (DDP).

Born in Frankfurt am Main, Hufnagel was the son of the teacher Johannes Hufnagel and his wife Ida Marie Henriette née Aschenbrenner. Hufnagel studied at the Heidelberg University. In 1912 he became a senior teacher in Bad Arolsen and was promoted to a student councilor there in 1924. Later he became a student councilor at the Heinrich-von-Gagern-Gymnasium in Frankfurt. From 1919 to 1922 he was a member of parliament for the DDP in the Waldecker Landesvertretun.

Hufnagel died in Westerburg at the age of 59.

== Publications ==
- Die Rückforderung der durch öffentliche Armen-Unterstützung geleisteten Beiträge vom Unterstützten und von dritten Personen unter besonderer Berücksichtigung des preussischen Rechtes.
- Kaspar Schlicks letztes Hervortreten in der Politik, nebst einem kritischen Beitrag zu dem Fälschungsproblem, Inaugural-Dissertation ... von Otto Hufnagel.
- Kaspar Schlicks letztes Hervortreten in der Politik nebst einem kritischen Beitrag zu dem Fälschungsproblem. : [Kap. I, II, III].
- Der waldeckische Staat. Eine verfassungsgeschichtliche Betrachtung.

== Literature ==
- Reinhard König: Die Abgeordneten des Waldeckischen Landtags von 1848 bis 1929. ISBN 3-88964-122-9, p. 53
- Jochen Lengemann: MdL Hessen 1808–1996, 1996, ISBN 3-7708-1071-6, p. 95.
