= Franz Brendle =

German historian

Franz Brendle (born in 1964) is a German historian and scholar teacher.

== Life ==
Born in Ellwangen, Brendle attended the Peutinger-Gymnasium Ellwangen from 1974 to 1983, which he completed with the Abitur in 1983. From 1984 to 1991 he studied history and German literature at the University of Tübingen. From 1993 to 1995 Brendle received a doctoral scholarship from the Konrad-Adenauer-Stiftung and was at the same time research fellow, from 1997 to 1998 as scientific assistant, at the History Department of the University of Tübingen. In 1997, he received his doctorate with a dissertation on the subject of Dynasty, Empire and Reformation. The Dukes of Württemberg Ulrich and Christoph, the Habsburgs and France. at the University of Tübingen.

Since 1998 Brendle has been a member of the Akademischer Rat of the History Department of the University of Tübingen and in the same year was a scientific advisor at the SWR for the film project Württemberg in the Thirty Years' War. In 1999 he was awarded the Baden-Württemberg History Prize. He 2008 he received his habilitation at the University of Tübingen with the thesis Der Erzkanzler im Religionskrieg. Archbishop Anselm Casimir Wambold von Umstadt, Kurmainz and the Empire 1629 to 1647. Since 2010 he has been an extraordinary professor at the Department of History of the University of Tübingen. Brendle was an associate member of the Tübingen Research Training Group Ars and Scientia in the Middle Ages and Early Modern Times from 1995 to 2005. Since 1998 he has been a member of the Scientific Advisory Board of the Society for the Publication of the Corpus Catholicorum and from 2011 to 2015 he is sub-project leader of the Collaborative Research Centre 923 Threatened Orders. He is author and editor of over 50 publications.

== Work ==
=== Author ===
- Dynastie, Reich und Reformation. Die württembergischen Herzöge Ulrich und Christoph, die Habsburger und Frankreich. Kohlhammer, Stuttgart 1998, ISBN 3-17-015563-6.
- Das konfessionelle Zeitalter. Akademie Verlag, Berlin 2010, ISBN 978-3-05-004554-2.
- Der Erzkanzler im Religionskrieg. Kurfürst Anselm Casimir von Mainz, die geistlichen Fürsten und das Reich 1629 bis 1647. Aschendorff, Münster 2011, ISBN 978-3-402-12802-2.

=== Editor ===
- Adel im alten Reich. Bibliotheca-Academica-Verlag, Tübingen 1998, ISBN 3-928471-16-3.
- Deutsche Landesgeschichtsschreibung im Zeichen des Humanismus. Steiner, Stuttgart 2001, ISBN 3-515-07864-9.
- Religionskriege im Alten Reich und in Alteuropa. Aschendorff, Münster 2006, ISBN 978-3-402-06363-7.
- Geistliche im Krieg. Aschendorff, Münster 2009, ISBN 978-3-402-12790-2.
- Jesuiten in Ellwangen. Oberdeutsche Provinz, Wallfahrt, Weltmission. Kohlhammer, Stuttgart 2012, ISBN 978-3-17-022053-9.
