= Harm Klueting =

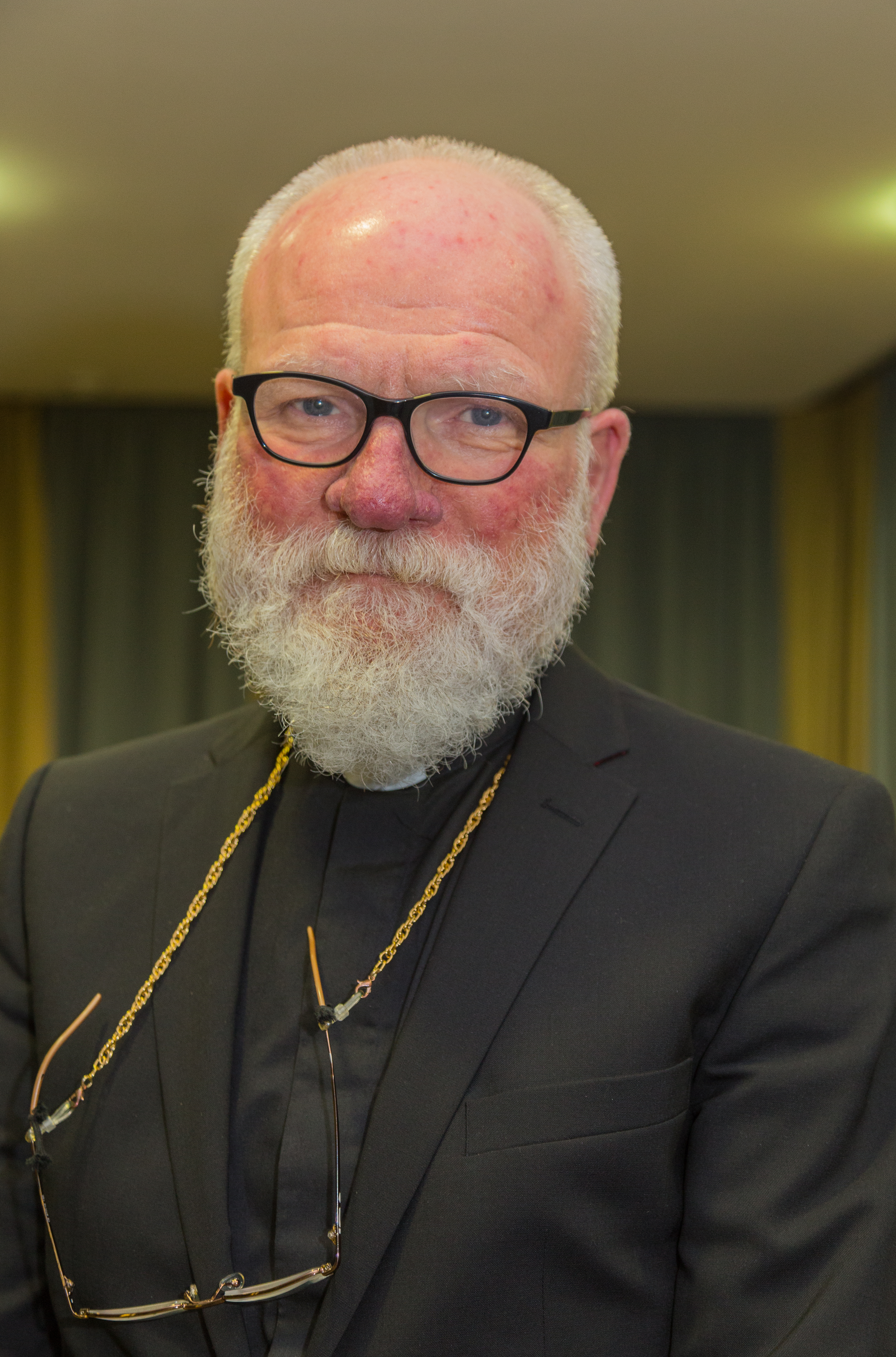
Harm Klueting

Harm Klueting (born 23 March 1949 in Iserlohn, Germany) is a German historian, theologian, university professor and a Roman Catholic priest converted from Lutheranism. His research focuses on church history and general history of the early modern period. But he also has books on the history of Westphalia presented.

== Biography ==
Harm Klueting is son of Herman and Esther Klueting and was born in Iserlohn. After visiting the Hagen-Hohenlimburg primary school, he went to the Friedrich-Gymnasium Harkort in Herdecke. This he left early and completed training as a bookseller. Klueting later became a gifted special approval of the North Rhine-Westphalian Minister of Culture, the General university before moving on to secondary school leaving certificate in Latin (the Great supplementary examinations Latinum), Greek and Hebrew. From 1969 Klueting studied history, Auxiliary sciences of history at the Universities of Bochum, Cologne and Wuppertal (Theological Colleges), Edinburgh, Münster (Westphalia) and Paris (Institut Catholique de Paris). In Bochum, he received his doctorate in Slavic Studies as Doctor of Philosophy in 1974. In 1978 he finished in Cologne from his history studies with a master's degree in Medieval and Modern History. From 1981 to 1983 he was habilitated at the Deutsche Forschungsgemeinschaft. In 1984 he received his habilitation at the University of Cologne in modern history and was a lecturer there. In 1984 was his election as an ordinary member of the Historical Commission for Westphalia. This was followed by professorships at the University of Osnabrück for Early Modern History 1985–1987, at the University of Bonn (Chair Konrad Repgen) 1989/90 and at the University of Göttingen. In 1989 Klueting was appointed associate professor at the University of Cologne. This was followed by a teaching post at the College of Education Hall on the Saale and visiting professor of Modern History at the University of Leicester in England in 1991 and at the Emory University in Atlanta in the U.S., both in modern history. In 1998 Klueting studied Protestant theology at the University of Münster with a degree in theology from. In 2000 he was ordained Protestant minister. In 2001/02 he was a visiting professor at the Theological Faculty of the University of Zurich in church history. In 2002 he became professor of church history at the Protestant Theological Institute in Sibiu in Romania. The following year he received his doctorate at the Evangelical Theological Faculty of the University of Münster in church history as a doctor of theology. He qualified in 2004 for the church and the history of dogma by habilitation of Sibiu at the Augustana Divinity School (Neuendettelsau) in Neuendettelsau. Klueting is editor of the book series profana et Historia ecclesiastica, History and church history between the Middle Ages and Modern and co-editor of Innsbruck's historical studies

== Conversion to Roman Catholicism ==
In 2004, Harm Klueting converted to the Catholic faith. In 2005 he obtained the papal Validation of foreign studies and degrees of his theological doctorate within the meaning of the Apostolic doctorate. In 2007 he was to Neuendettelsau at the Catholic Theological Faculty of the University of Fribourg (Switzerland) and obtained an habilitation for Medieval and Modern History. In 2009 he was in the Archdiocese of Cologne and was ordained deacon. On 22 February 2011, despite the fact that he is married, with one exception approval to Can. 1047 § 3 CIC from Cologne Cardinal and Archbishop Joachim Meisner Klueting was ordained as a diocesan priest and was incardinated at the Archdiocese of Cologne. Klueting is Professor of Modern History at the University of Cologne (Faculty of Philosophy, Department of History) and at the same time he is professor of Catholic theology in the subject Medieval and Modern Church History at the University of Fribourg, Switzerland as well as Associate Member of the Institute of Catholic Theology Faculty of Arts of the University of Cologne for the subject of Historical Theology / Medieval and Modern Church History. Klueting is married to Edeltraud Klueting, who is also Catholic theologian and historian, and has two adult children.

== Journals (selection) ==
Church history:

Luther and the modern era; Primus, Darmstadt, 2011, ISBN 978-3-89678-857-3.

Pious women as learned women. Education, Science and Art in the female Religiosentum the Middle Ages and Modern Times (Mit-Hrsg. with Edeltraud Klueting); Archiepiscopal Diocesan and Cathedral Library, Cologne, 2010 (Libelli Rhenani the Diocesan and Archdiocesan Cathedral Library writings on the Rhenish churches and regional history. and for book and library history, Volume 37), ISBN 978-3-939160-30-4.

The Catholic Enlightenment in Austria or the Habsburg lands – In: A Companion to the Catholic Enlightenment in Europe. Ed. by [[Ulrich L. Lehner|Ulrich L. Lehner]] and Michael Printy. Brill, Leiden, 2010, pp. 127–164.

The Confessional Age. Europe between medieval and modern. Church History and General History, 2 vols, vol 1: Primus, Darmstadt, 2007, ISBN 978-3-89678-337-0, Vol 2 (Notes & Literature): LIT, Berlin, 2009, ISBN 978-3 -8258-0360-5.

Dioceses and the diocese borders from the early Middle Ages to the Present (Mit-Hrsg. with Edeltraud Klueting and Hans-Joachim Schmidt); Herder, Rome, 2006 ISBN 978-3-451-26857-1.

Edith Stein and Dietrich Bonhoeffer. Two ways to follow Christ, John-Verlag, village people, 2004 ISBN 3-7794-1499-6 . Adopted by Paulinus-Verlag, Trier (ISBN 978-3-7902-2049-0).

Reformatio vitae. Johann Jacob Fabricius (1618/20-1673). A contribution to confessionalization and social disciplining in Lutheranism of the 17th Century, LIT, Münster, 2003, ISBN 3-8258-7051-0 (Theol. Diss University of Münster).

Public proclamation of the Word and Sacrament in voluntary administration in the member churches of the Evangelical Church; carbon hammer, Stuttgart, 2002, ISBN 3-17-017208-5.

"Quidquid territorio est, est etiam de teritorio": Josephinisches state church as a rational territorialism – in: The State 37 (1998) pp. 417–434.

General History of the Modern Age:

200 years Reichsdeputationshauptschluss. Secularization, modernization and mediatization between old and new kingdom of law (ed.); Aschendorff, Münster, 2005, ISBN 3-402-05616-X.

The Empire and its territorial states in the 17th and 18th Century (Mit-Hrsg., with Wolfgang Schmale), LIT, Münster, 2004, ISBN 3-8258-7414-1 Irenics and Antikonfessionalismus in the 17th and 18th Century (ed.); Olms, Hildesheim, 2003, ISBN 3-487-11940-4.

The Empire and Austria 1648–1740, LIT, Münster, 1999, ISBN 3-8258-4280-0.

Josephinism. Selected sources on the history of theresianisch-Josephine reforms, Wiss. Book Company, Darmstadt, 1995, ISBN 3-534-02340-4.

Catholic Enlightenment – Enlightenment in Catholic Germany (Eds.), Meiner, Hamburg, 1993, ISBN 3-7873-1107-6 The Denominational Era 1525–1648, Ulm, Stuttgart, 1989, ISBN 3-8001-2611-7.

The doctrine of the power of the States. The foreign policy power problem in the "political science" and in practical politics in the 18th Century, Duncker & Humblot, Berlin, 1986, ISBN 3-428-06052-0 (Habil font University of Cologne).

Westfalica:

The Duchy of Westphalia. Vol 1: The Duchy of Westphalia kurkölnische from the beginnings of eau de Cologne rule in southern Westphalia to Säkukarisation 1803 (Mit-Hrsg., with Jens foci); Aschendorff, Münster, 2009, ISBN 978-3-402-12827-5; Bd . 2 (in-Tl 2 vols.): The former kurkölnische Duchy of Westphalia in the area of today's circuits Sauerland, Olpe, Soest and Maerkischer Circle (19th and 20th century) (Mit-Hrsg., with Jens foci); Aschendorff, Münster, 2012, ISBN 978-3-402-12862-6.

History of Westphalia. The land between the Rhine and Weser of the 8th to 20th Century, Boniface, Paderborn, 1998, ISBN 3-89710-050-9 History of city and department Medebach (Sauerland); city Medebach Medebach, 1994.

Johann Suibert Seibertz: (1788–1871); life and work of the Westphalian historian, exhibition catalog, Brilon, 1988 Secularization in the Duchy of Westphalia from 1802 to 1832.

Preparation, implementation and socio-economic impact dissolution of the monastery; Bohlau, Cologne, 1980, ISBN 3-412-06979-5.

Slavonic:

The Dutch embassy to Muscovy in 1630 / 31st Russian edition of the Protocols and their Dutch translations. With palaeography and linguistic description. A contribution to the Russian firm language (Prikaznyj Jazyk) of the 17th Century; Hakkert, Amsterdam, 1976, ISBN 90-256-0756-X (Phil Diss University of Bochum).

== Literature ==
- Foken, Jens; Klueting, Harm (2009). Das kurkölnische Herzogtum Westfalen von den Anfängen der kölnischen Herrschaft im südlichen Westfalen bis zur Säkularisation 1803 (in German). Münster, Westf: Aschendorff. ISBN 978-3-402-12827-5. OCLC 553531399.
