= Victor Schultze =

German church historian and archaeologist

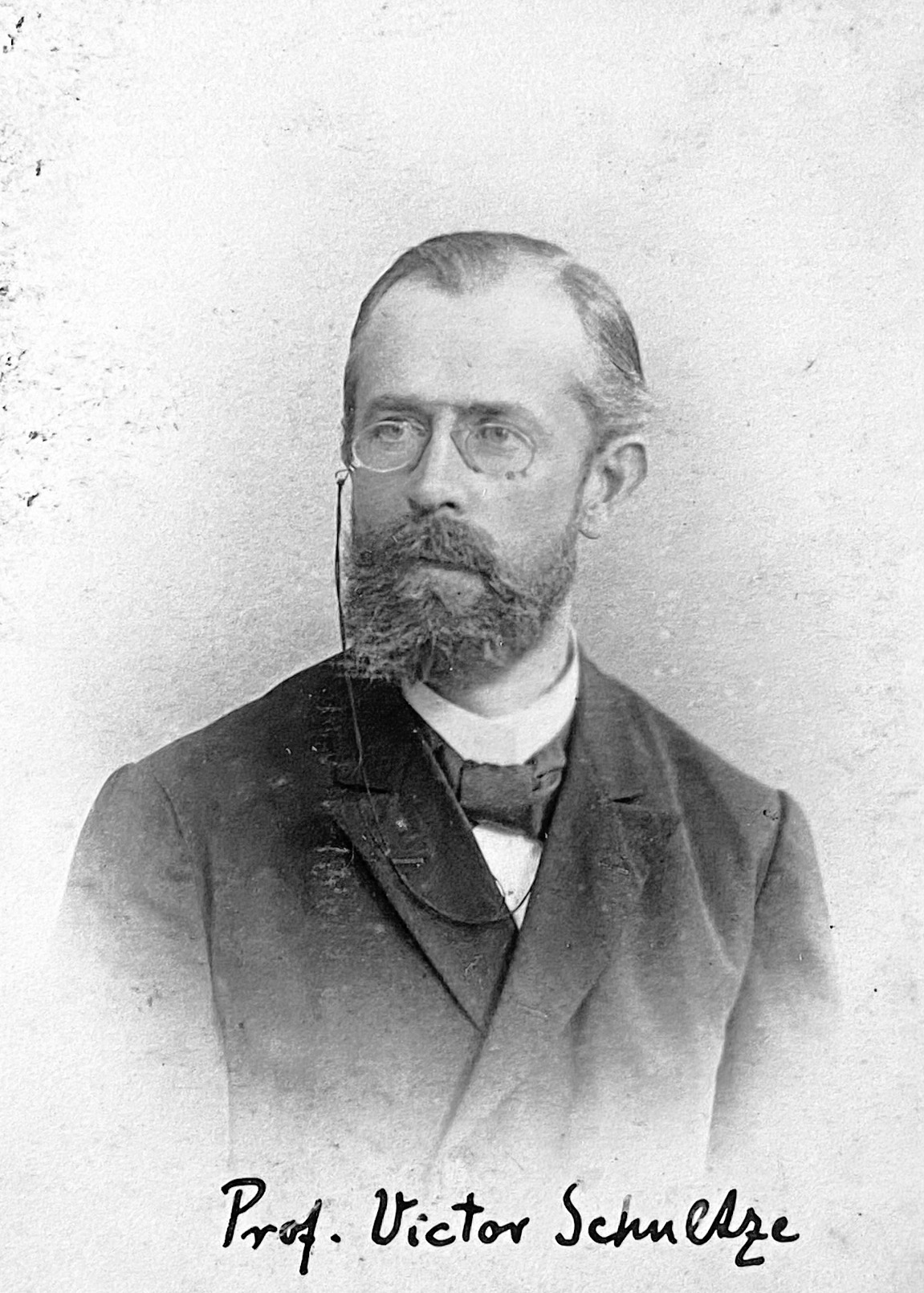
Image of Victor Schultze

Victor Schultze (13 December 1851, in Fürstenberg – 6 January 1937, in Greifswald) was a German church historian and archaeologist.

He studied theology and art history at the universities of Basel, Strasbourg, Jena and Göttingen, and in 1879 qualified as a lecturer of church history and Christian archaeology at the University of Leipzig. In 1884 he became an associate professor at Greifswald, where from 1888 to 1920 he taught classes as a full professor at the university.

== Selected works ==
- Geschichte des Untergangs des griechisch-römischen Heidentums, vol. 1 1887, vol. 2 1892 – History on the downfall of Greco-Roman paganism.
- Die Katakomben von San Gennaro dei Poveri in Neapel, 1877 – The catacombs of San Gennaro dei Poveri in Naples.
- Archäologische Studien über altchristliche Monumente, 1880 – Archaeological studies on early Christian monuments.
- Die Katakomben : die altchristlichen Grabstätten : ihre Geschichte und ihre Monumente, 1882 – The catacombs; the early Christian tombs, history and monuments.
- Archäologie der altchristlichen Kunst, 1895 – Archaeology of early Christian art.
- Altchristliche Städte und Landschaften, 3 vols. 1913-1930 – Early Christian towns and landscapes.
- Grundriss der christlichen Archäologie, 1919 – Outline of Christian archaeology.

He was also editor of the Geschichtsblätter für Waldeck und Pyrmont ("History papers for Waldeck and Pyrmont").
