= Helmut Neuhaus =

German historian of modern age

Helmut Neuhaus (born 29 August 1944) is a German historian who specialises on the Early modern period. From 1989 to 2009 he held the Chair of Modern History I at the University of Erlangen–Nuremberg.

== life and work ==
Born in Iserlohn, Neuhaus studied history, German and philosophy as well as law and political science at the University of Tübingen and the University of Marburg. In 1971 he passed his first Staatsexamen for the teaching profession at grammar schools. In 1975 he received his doctorate in Marburg under Gerhard Oestreich in the subjects Medieval and Modern History, Ancient History and Modern German Literature with the thesis Reichstag und Supplikationsausschuss. Ein Beitrag zur Reichsverfassungsgeschichte der ersten Hälfte des 16. Jahrhunderts

Eleven years later Neuhaus habilitated in modern and contemporary history. His appointment as a private lecturer followed. From 1973 to 1988 he worked during this time as a research associate and research assistant in Marburg and the University of Cologne. Between 1974 and 1992, numerous lectureships took him to Millersville (USA), University of Kassel and Friedrich-Schiller-Universität Jena. From 1987 to 1988 he was professor of early modern history at the Catholic University of Eichstätt-Ingolstadt. In 1989 he was appointed to the Chair I for Modern History at the University of Erlangen–Nuremberg, which he held until his retirement. He rejected appointments to the University of Bonn (1989) and the Leipzig University (1996).

Since 1987 Neuhaus has been a member of the Association for Constitutional History, of which he was chairman from 2006 to 2010. Since 1998 he has also been a full member of the Historical Commission at the Bavarian Academy of Sciences, whose secretary he was elected in 2006. From 2005 to 2007 he was chairman of the working group "Early Modern Times" in the Association of German Historians.

Neuhaus' field of work covers a wide range of topics in early modern German history with a special focus on the constitutional history of the Holy Roman Empire, to whose research he has made an important contribution. At the end of the summer semester of 2009 he gave his farewell lecture on the topic Die Goldene Bulle von 1356 in der Frühen Neuzeit (The Golden Bull of 1356 in the Early Modern Period).

== Publications ==
- Reichstag und Supplikationsausschuß. Ein Beitrag zur Reichsverfassungsgeschichte der ersten Hälfte des 16. Jahrhunderts.(Schriften zur Verfassungsgeschichte. Volume 24). Berlin 1977.
- Die Konstitutionen des Corps Teutonia zu Marburg. Untersuchungen zur Verfassungsentwicklung eines Kösener Corps in seiner 150-jährigen Geschichte. Marburg an der Lahn 1979.
- Religiöse Bewegungen und soziale Umbrüche an der Wende vom Mittelalter zur Neuzeit. (Kurs: Geschichte/Politik. Unterrichtsmaterialien für die Sekundarstufe II. Edited by Reiner Pommerin). Düsseldorf 1980.
- Reichsständische Repräsentationsformen im 16. Jahrhundert. Reichstag, Reichskreistag, Reichsdeputationstag. Schriften zur Verfassungsgeschichte. Volume 33). Berlin 1982.
- as editor: Geschichtswissenschaft in Erlangen. (Erlanger Studien zur Geschichte. Volume 6). Erlangen 2000.
- Das Reich in der Frühen Neuzeit. (Enzyklopädie deutscher Geschichte. Volume 42). Munich 1997, 2nd edition 2003.
- Zeitalter des Absolutismus. 1648–1789. (Deutsche Geschichte in Quellen und Darstellung. Volume 5). Stuttgart 1997.
- with Klaus Herbers: Das Heilige Römische Reich. Schauplätze einer tausendjährigen Geschichte (843–1806). Cologne among others 2005, 2nd edition. 2006.
- 150 Jahre Historische Kommission bei der Bayerischen Akademie der Wissenschaften. Eine Chronik. Munich 2008.

== Literature ==
- Axel Gotthard, Andreas Jakob, Thomas Nicklas (ed.): Studien zur politischen Kultur Alteuropas. Festschrift für Helmut Neuhaus zum 65. Geburtstag.(Historische Forschungen. Volume 91). Duncker & Humblot, Berlin 2009, ISBN 978-3-428-12576-0.
