= Volker Press =

German historian (1939–1993)

Volker Press (1939 – 1993) was a German historian.

== Life and career ==
Volker Press studied history and English from 1957 to 1965 at the Ludwig-Maximilians-Universität München. He completed his doctorate in 1966 with Friedrich Hermann Schubert with a dissertation on the Electorate of the Palatinate in the confessional age. After serving as an assistant at Kiel University and Goethe University Frankfurt, he took a post as a full professor (Professor ordinarius) of modern history at the University of Giessen. In 1980, he moved to a post at the University of Tübingen where he taught medieval and modern history until his sudden death in 1993.

The focal points of Press's research included the imperial knights, the ecclesiastical territories seized by the imperial nobles, and the position of the Habsburg emperors in the Holy Roman Empire and in their home territories. His papers are in the possession of the archive of the University of Tübingen. His voluminous library was acquired by the Charles University in Prague. Press had been a member of the Heidelberg Academy of Sciences since 1991.

== Works ==
Monographs

- Calvinismus und Territorialstaat: Regierung und Zentralbehörden der Kurpfalz 1559–1619. Stuttgart: Klett-Cotta, 1970.
- Das alte Reich: Ausgewählte Aufsätze. Stephanie Blankenhorn and Johannes Kunisc, eds. 2nd. edition, Berlin: 2000, ISBN 3-428-09138-8.
- Kaiser Karl V., König Ferdinand und die Entstehung der Reichsritterschaft. Wiesbaden: Steiner, 1976.
- Kriege und Krisen: Deutschland 1600–1715. Neue Deutsche Geschichte. Munich: C.H. Beck, 1991., ISBN 3-406-30817-1.
- Südwestdeutsche Bischofsresidenzen ausserhalb der Kathedralstädte. Stuttgart: Kohlhammer, 1992.

Edited volumes

- Moraw, Peter and Volker Press, ed. Academia Gissensis: Beiträge zur älteren Giessener Universitätsgeschichte. Marburg, 1982, ISBN 3-7708-0734-0.
- Press, Volker, and Dieter Stievermann, ed. Altes Reich und Deutscher Bund: Kontinuität in der Diskontinuität. Munich: Oldenbourg, 1995.
- Press, Volker, and Dieter Stievermann, ed. Martin Luther: Probleme seiner Zeit. Stuttgart: Klett-Cotta, 1986. ISBN 3-608-91431-5.
- Press, Volker, ed. Alternativen zur Reichsverfassung in der frühen Neuzeit? Munich: Oldenbourg, 1995. ISBN 3-486-56035-2.
