= Hans-Christof Kraus =

German historian

Hans-Christof Kraus (born 3 November 1958) is a German historian.

== Life ==
Born in Göttingen, Kraus studied history, German literature and philosophy at the Georg-August-Universität Göttingen from 1978 to 1984. In the 1980s he was editor of the Young Conservatives Phoenix magazine. In the late 1980s and 1990s he wrote articles for right-wing conservatism journals Etappe and Criticón, as the student assistant at the Institute of History at the Humboldt University of Berlin, Niklas Weber, wrote in an article in the Süddeutsche Zeitung, which was criticized by Benjamin Hasselhorn as "one-sided and distorting."

In 1992, he submitted his dissertation on the Prussian conservative Ernst Ludwig von Gerlach in the subject of modern history to Rudolf von Thadden. In 1994/1995, Kraus was a scholarship holder at the Historisches Kolleg in Munich. In 2002, after his habilitation, he studied at LMU Munich with the topic English constitution and political thought in the Ancien Régime 1689-1789. The work was reviewed by Horst Möller, Eckhart Hellmuth and Hans-Michael Körner. After teaching activities at the University of Administrative Sciences, Speyer and at the University of Stuttgart, LMU Munich and the University of Jena, he was appointed to the chair of Modern and Contemporary History at the University of Passau in 2007.

Kraus' work and research focuses on German and English history of the 18th to 20th century, the history of politics, Constitutional History, political History of Ideas, as well as the history of education and science. For his research Kraus has been awarded numerous scientific honours and memberships. Kraus is a member of several historical commissions, such as the Historische Kommission bei der Bayerischen Akademie der Wissenschaften, the Kommission für Geschichte des Parlamentarismus und der politischen Parteien, the Historische Kommission zu Berlin and the Vereinigung für Verfassungsgeschichte. He is a member of the board of the Preußische Historische Kommission. Kraus is also editor of the Neue Deutsche Biographie and co-editor of various historical journals, including the Zeitschrift für Neuere Rechtsgeschichte, the Jahrbuch Politisches Denken and the Passauer Jahrbuch. In 2006, he was awarded the Historian Prize of the Erich and Erna Kronauer Foundation.

== Writings ==
Monographs

- Der Wendepunkt des Philosophen von Sanssouci. Duncker & Humblot, Berlin 2017, ISBN 978-3-428-15390-9.
- Bismarck. Größe – Grenzen – Leistungen. Klett-Cotta, Stuttgart 2015, ISBN 978-3-608-94861-5.
- Versailles und die Folgen. Außenpolitik zwischen Revisionismus und Verständigung (1919–1933) (Deutsche Geschichte im 20. Jahrhundert. Vol. 4). Be.bra-Verlag, Berlin-Brandenburg 2013, ISBN 978-3-89809-404-7 (Als Lizenzausgabe: (Bundeszentrale für Politische Bildung. Schriftenreihe. 1540). Bundeszentrale für politische Bildung, Bonn 2014, ISBN 978-3-8389-0540-2).
- Kultur, Bildung und Wissenschaft im 19. Jahrhundert (Enzyklopädie deutscher Geschichte. Vol. 82). Oldenbourg, München 2008, ISBN 978-3-486-55727-5.
- Das Ende des alten Deutschland. Krise und Auflösung des Heiligen Römischen Reiches Deutscher Nation 1806 (Wissenschaftliche Abhandlungen und Reden zur Philosophie, Politik und Geistesgeschichte. Vol. 37). Duncker & Humblot, Berlin 2006, ISBN 3-428-12217-8 (2nd revised edition; id. 2007, ISBN 978-3-428-12492-3).
- Englische Verfassung und politisches Denken im Ancien Régime. 1689 bis 1789 (Veröffentlichungen des Deutschen Historischen Instituts London. Vol. 60). Oldenbourg, Munich 2006, ISBN 3-486-57908-8 (in the same time, Ludwig-Maximilians-Universität München, Habilitation thesis, 2001/2002).
- Theodor Anton Heinrich Schmalz. (1760–1831). Jurisprudenz, Universitätspolitik und Publizistik im Spannungsfeld von Revolution und Restauration (Studien zur europäischen Rechtsgeschichte. Vol. 124). Klostermann, Frankfurt 1999, ISBN 3-465-03047-8.
- Ernst Ludwig von Gerlach. Politisches Denken und Handeln eines preußischen Altkonservativen (Schriftenreihe der Historischen Kommission bei der Bayerischen Akademie der Wissenschaften. Vol. 53). 2 volumes. Vandenhoeck und Ruprecht, Göttingen 1994, ISBN 3-525-36046-0 (in the same time: University of Göttingen, Dissertation, 1992).

As editor

- Fritz Hartung. Korrespondenz eines Historikers zwischen Kaiserreich und zweiter Nachkriegszeit. Duncker und Humblot, Berlin 2019, ISBN 978-3-428-15731-0.
- Ernst Ludwig von Gerlach: Gottesgnadentum und Freiheit. Ausgewählte politische Schriften aus den Jahren 1863 bis 1866. Herausgegeben und mit einem Nachwort versehen. Karolinger, Vienna among others 2011, ISBN 978-3-85418-141-5.
- Konservative Politiker in Deutschland. Eine Auswahl biographischer Porträts aus zwei Jahrhunderten. Duncker und Humblot, Berlin 1995, ISBN 3-428-08193-5.
