= Konrad Repgen =

German historian (1923–2017)

- Born: 5 May 1923; Friedrich-Wilhelms-Hütte (Troisdorf), Rhineland, Germany
- Died: 2 April 2017 (aged 93); Bonn, Germany
- Occupation: Historian
- Children: Tilman Repgen legal historian

Konrad Repgen (5 May 1923 – 2 April 2017) was a German historian and a professor emeritus (retired) at the University of Bonn. He was revered for his work on contemporary church history.

== Life ==
Konrad Repgen was born in 1923 at Friedrich-Wilhelms-Hütte, part of the conurbation of Troisdorf, a short distance to the south-east of Cologne. His father was a teacher and an active member of the Catholic Centre Party. In January 1933, a régime change heralded a rapid switch to single-party government, and Repgen's father, identified as an activist member of one of the "wrong" parties, lost his teaching job the same year.

Konrad Repgen completed his schooling at the Beethoven-Gymnasium (school) in Bonn in 1941. War had resumed in 1939, and Repgen was promptly conscripted into the army, serving as a soldier on the Russian Front until 1945. With the end of the war, in May 1945, he found himself captured by the British army and held as a prisoner of war till August of that year. Release came in time to enable him to enroll for the winter semester at Bonn University, where over the next five years he studied History, Germanistics, Philosophy and Latin. While at university Repgen joined the Arminia Catholic student fraternity. He received his doctorate in 1950 for a dissertation on the March Movement and the May Elections which were features of the political turmoil of 1848 in the Rhineland. The work, which was supervised by Max Braubach, was adapted as a book and found a publisher a few years later.

Between 1952 and 1955, Repgen undertook an extended period of research at the German Historical Institute in Rome. A significant landmark followed in 1958 when he received his habilitation for a piece of work entitled "The Roman Curia and the Peace of Westphalia. Pope, emperor and state." (" Die römische Kurie und der Westfälische Friede. Papst, Kaiser und Reich"). He relocated from the Bonn area in 1962 when he was appointed to a full professorship at the Saarland University at Saarbrücken, where he remained until 1967. Back at Bonn, that was he year in which his old teacher Max Braubach retired from the Konkordatslehrstuhl (teaching chair), and Repgen returned to Bonn to take it on. He remained at Bonn as a professor in Medieval and Modern history until his retirement in 1988. Between 1985 and 1988, he was also dean of the Philosophy Faculty. Briefly, in 1975/76, he combined his duties at Bonn with a post as a visiting fellow at the University of Oxford. As a teacher at Saarbrücken and Bonn, he has supervised fifty doctorates and seven habilitations. His historian students include Winfried Baumgart, Franz Bosbach, Klaus Gotto, Ulrich von Hehl, Hans Günter Hockerts, Markus Huttner, Christoph Kampmann and Karsten Ruppert.

Konrad Repgen's research primarily focused on editorial work related to early modern Europe, but he also studied the political and social history of the nineteenth and twentieth centuries. He rejected the sociological-political historical prism favoured by the so-called Bielefeld School, and is regarded as a conservative among historians. For many years, he headed up the long-running "Acta Pacis Westphalicae" project, which publishes archive material covering the succession of congresses that eventually, in 1648, came up with what became known as the Peace of Westphalia. He has also published standard works on national and church history, among them "Dreißigjähriger Krieg und Westfälischer Friede", for which in 1998 he won the History prize of the City of Münster. (The city was much impacted by the war and involved in the treaties that concluded it.) In addition, between 1976 and 1997, he was in charge of the Archive Section at the Reich Chancellery covering the twelve years of the Hitler government. He was a member of the British Academy, of the (German) Commission for Contemporary History, the Commission for Parliamentary History and of Political Parties, the Historical Commission of the Bavarian Academy, and of the North Rhine-Westphalian Academy of Sciences, Humanities and the Arts.

In 1989, Repgen was appointed a Commander of the Order of St. Gregory the Great. In 1995, he was awarded an honorary doctorate by the Culture Faculty of the newly established University of Bayreuth. In 1998, he was honoured with the Ring of Honour from the Görres Society, and in 2000 with the Prize of the Alfried Krupp von Bohlen und Halbach Foundation. He was an advisory council member with the Munich-based Institute for Contemporary History since 1972 and with the Italian-German Historical Institute since 1973.
