= Codex Guelferbytanus =

Codex Guelferbytanus or Codex Guelpherbytanus may refer to:

- Codex Guelferbytanus A
- Codex Guelferbytanus B
- Codex Guelferbytanus 64 Weissenburgensis, which contains in the lower text of the palimpsests: Codex Guelferbytanus A, Codex Guelferbytanus B, and Codex Carolinus.
- Codex Vaticanus 354, formerly the Codex Guelpherbytanus
- Minuscule 126, also called Codex Guelpherbytanus (C) by Franz Anton Knittel
- Minuscule 429, also called Codex Guelpherbytanus (E) by Franz Anton Knittel before it was called Act. 69, Paul 74., and Apoc. 30 by Scrivener
