= Romans 12 =

- ← chapter 11 chapter 13 →
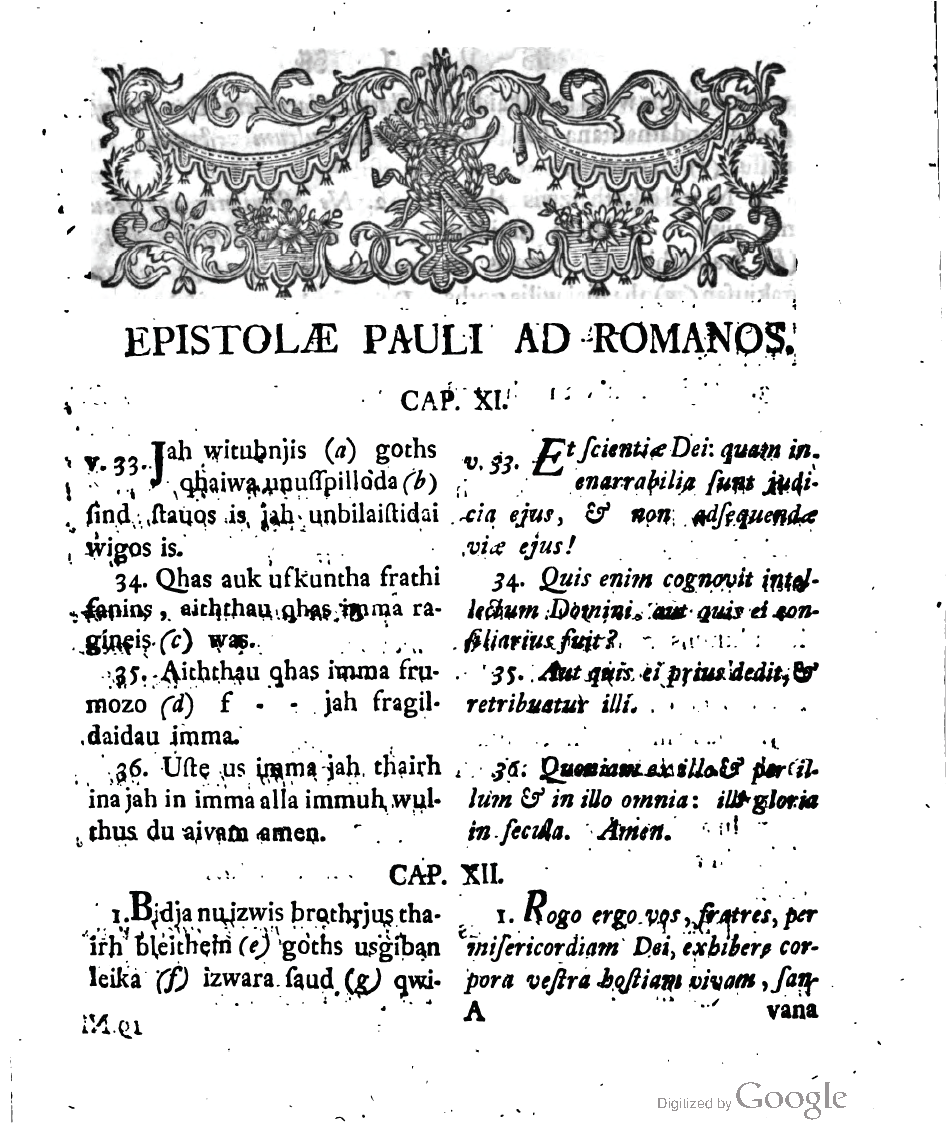
- Romans 11:33–12:1 on Knittel's edition of Codex Carolinus
- Book: Epistle to the Romans
- Category: Pauline epistles
- Christian Bible part: New Testament
- Order in the Christian part: 6

Romans 12 is the twelfth chapter of the Epistle to the Romans in the New Testament of the Christian Bible. It is authored by Paul the Apostle, while he was in Corinth in the mid-50s AD, with the help of an amanuensis (secretary), Tertius, who adds his own greeting in Romans 16:22.

According to Martin Luther,

In chapter 12, St. Paul teaches the true liturgy and makes all Christians priests, so that they may offer, not money or cattle, as priests do in the Law, but their own bodies, by putting their desires to death. Next he describes the outward conduct of Christians whose lives are governed by the Spirit; he tells how they teach, preach, rule, serve, give, suffer, love, live and act toward friend, foe and everyone. These are the works that a Christian does, for, as I have said, faith is not idle.

== Text ==
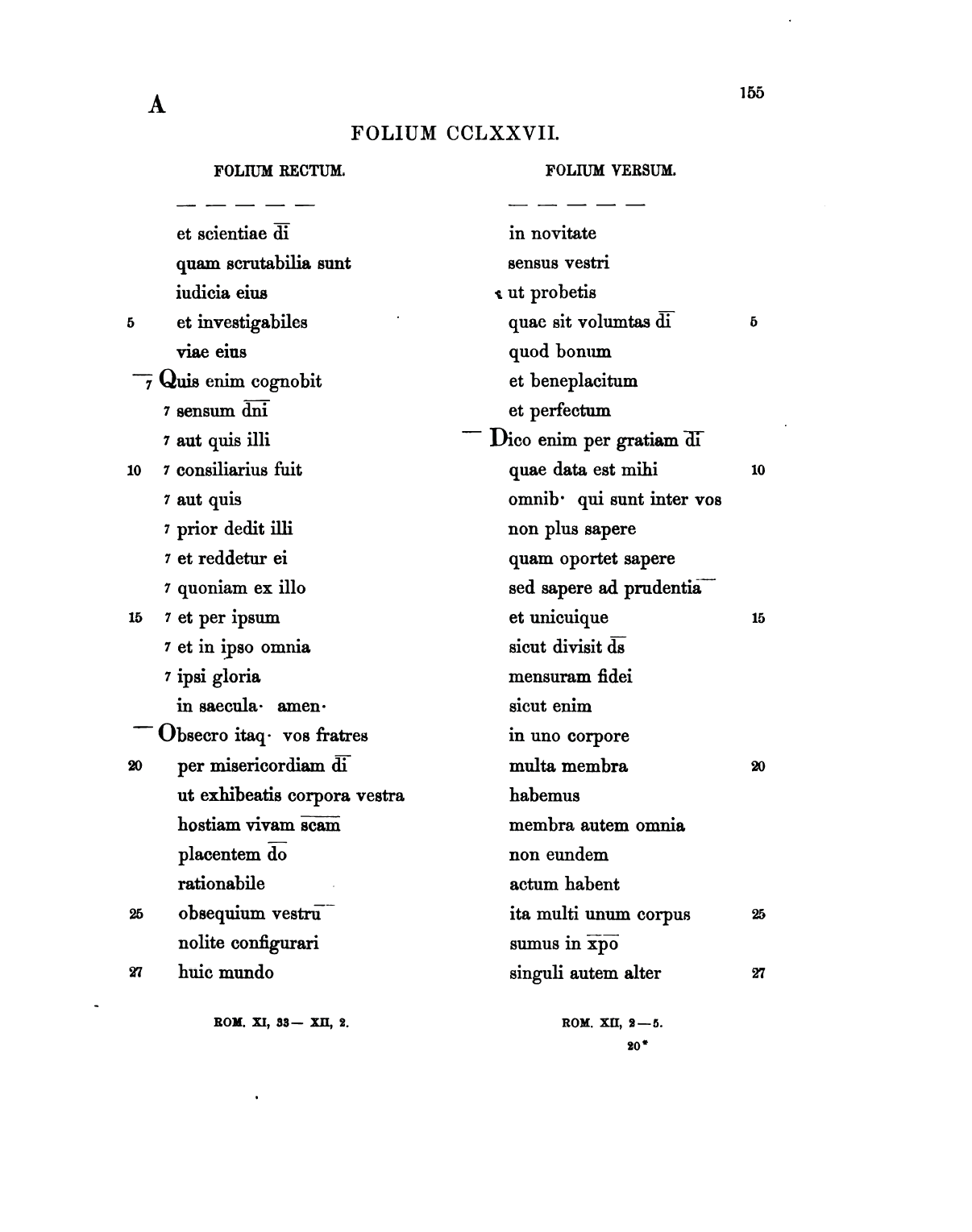
Romans 11:33–12:5 on Tischendorf's edition of Codex Carolinus (Monumenta, page 155).

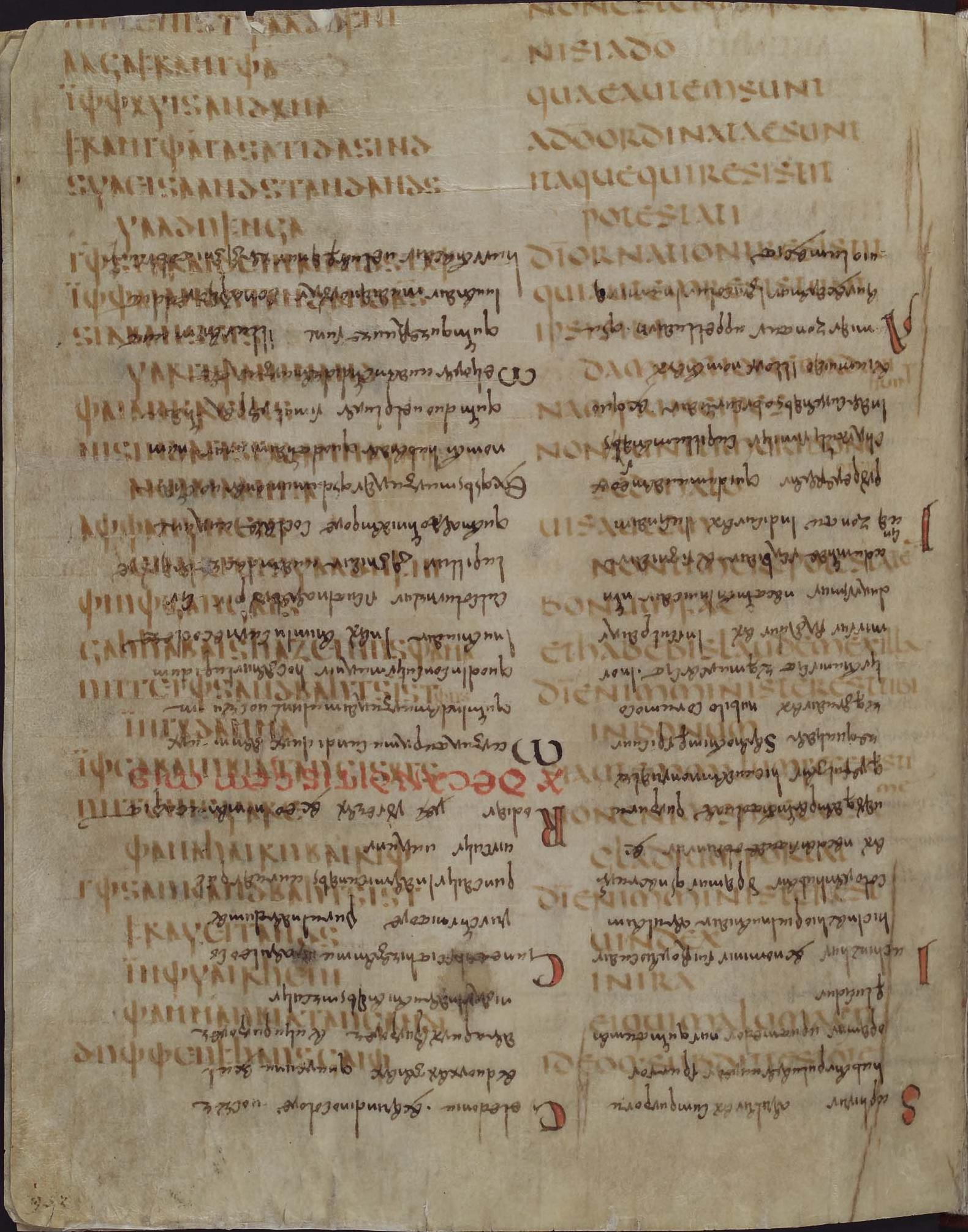
Folio 256 verso of Codex Guelferbytanus 64 Weissenburgensis, page 507, showing palimpsest with Romans 12:17–13:1 of Codex Carolinus at the lower layer; and Isidore of Seville's writings at the upper layer in reverse.

The original text was written in Koine Greek. This chapter is divided into 21 verses.

=== Textual witnesses ===
Some early manuscripts containing the text of this chapter are:

- In Greek:
  - Codex Vaticanus (AD 325–350)
  - Codex Sinaiticus (330–360)
  - Codex Alexandrinus (400–440)
- In Gothic language
  - Codex Carolinus (6th/7th century; extant verses 1–5, 17–21)
- In Latin
  - Codex Carolinus (6th/7th century; extant verses 1–5, 17–21)

=== Old Testament references ===
- Romans 12:19 references Deuteronomy 32:35
- Romans 12:20 references Proverbs 25:21,22

== A living sacrifice and the renewal of minds (verses 1–2) ==
=== Verse 1 ===
I beseech you therefore, brethren, by the mercies of God, that you present your bodies a living sacrifice, holy, acceptable to God, which is your reasonable service.

— Romans 12:1, New King James Version

The first letter of Peter uses a similar expressions:

You also, as living stones, are being built up a spiritual house, a holy priesthood, to offer up spiritual sacrifices acceptable to God through Jesus Christ

— 1 Peter 2:5, New King James Version

The word "therefore" links Paul's general exhortation to holiness with the foregoing verses in Romans 11 (Romans 11:33-36), "where the riches of God were described as, and shown to be, imparted apart from merit", although there have been a number of theologians who have treated "therefore" as following on from "the whole dogmatic part of the epistle, beginning with Romans 1:16".

Paul speaks of "reasonable service (worship)", (τὴν λογικὴν λατρείαν, tēn logikēn latreian) in contrast to the λατρεια, latreia, 'worship' which formed part of the Jewish covenant with God (Romans 9:4). Lutheran theologian Johann Albrecht Bengel summarises the contrasts to which Paul refers:

The service [worship], λατρέια, of the Gentiles is unreasonable, ἄλογος, (cf. Romans 1:18–25), the confidence of the Jews is unreasonable, ἄλογος, Romans 2:3), but the Christian considers all things rightly, and collects [infers] his duty from the kindness of a merciful God. The epithet λογικὴν now corresponds to that verb, λογίζεσθαι, which is often used (Romans 3:28, Romans 6:11 and Romans 8:18).

=== Verse 2 ===
And do not be conformed to this world, but be transformed by the renewing of your minds, that you may prove what is that good and acceptable and perfect will of God.

— Romans 12:2, New King James Version

- "Be conformed": translated from συσχηματίζεσθε, syschēmatizesthe 'to become like-shaped'; same word as 1 Peter 1:14 The verb is based on the Greek noun schema, indicating a 'form' that is external rather than internal, which occurs in 1 Corinthians 7:31 ("the fashion of this world") and Philippians 2:8 ("in fashion as a man").
- "To this world": 'This world' here is used in the sense of 'this age'. The same phrase appears in Matthew 12:32; Luke 16:8; 1 Corinthians 1:20; 1 Corinthians 2:6; 1 Corinthians 2:8; 1 Corinthians 3:18; 2 Corinthians 4:3; Galatians 1:4; Ephesians 1:21; 1 Timothy 6:17; 2 Timothy 4:10; and Titus 2:12.
- "Be transformed": translated from Greek μεταμορφοῦσθε, metamorphousthe having a root verb metamorphóō (the root of the English terms metamorphosis and metamorphize; from metá, 'change after being with' and morphóō, 'changing form in keeping with inner reality') meaning 'transformed after being with'; 'transfigured', occurring 4 times in the New Testament, including in Matthew 17:2, Mark 9:2 ('was transfigured', applied to Jesus), this verse, and 2 Corinthians 3:18 ('are changed').

== Exhortations for the Christian community (verses 3–8) ==
Verses 3–8 take the form of sermon, closely paralleled by 1 Corinthians 12:12–28. Paul starts the exhortation first to the humility and Christian unity, reflecting that he writes from Corinth, "the native habitat of spiritual pride and factional division" (cf. 1 Corinthians 1–4). A major difference with the epistle to the Corinthians is that the list of gifts in verses 6–8 includes gifts of exhortation, generosity, and compassion but not deeds of power, healings, and tongues as found in 1 Corinthians 12:28. In Romans the gifts are not related specifically to the activity of the Holy Spirit.

=== Verse 3 ===
For I say, through the grace given to me, to everyone who is among you, not to think of himself more highly than he ought to think, but to think soberly, as God has dealt to each one a measure of faith.

— Romans 12:3, New King James Version

- "Through the grace given to me": translated from Greek διὰ τῆς χάριτος τῆς δοθείσης μοι, dia tēs charitos tēs dotheisēs moi; 'by means of (in virtue of) the divine grace bestowed on me'; which characterizes Paul's apostleship (1 Corinthians 15:10; cf. Romans 15:15; 1 Corinthians 3:10; Ephesians 3:7–8).

=== Verse 4 ===
Each one of us has a body with many parts, and these parts all have different uses.

Heinrich Meyer criticised the Dutch theologian Wessel Albertus van Hengel for interpreting μέλη πάντα, melē panta, as if it read οὐ πάντα, ou panta, meaning "not all the parts".

=== Verse 5 ===
so we, being many, are one body in Christ, and individually members of one another.

- "In Christ" means "by virtue of the union with Christ" (cf. Romans 8:1; 2 Corinthians 5:17).

== Love in action (verses 9–21) ==
Described by Moo as "love and its manifestations", verses 9–21 are proverbial in tone, a style known as parenesis. Some verses echo the Old Testament, notably 16c, 19c, and 20, while others are reflections of Jesus' teachings (especially 14, 17, 18 and 21).

William Barclay suggests that in verses 9 to 13, "Paul presents his people with [twelve] telegraphic rules for everyday life".

=== Verses 17–21 ===
Verses 17–21 form a chiasm, bracketed by lines containing the word "evil" – verse 17a and verse 21. The next layer comprising verses 17b–18 and verse 20, deals with the way to treat non-Christians. The central portion is the prohibition of vengeance.

=== Verse 19 ===
Beloved, do not avenge yourselves, but rather give place to wrath; for it is written, "Vengeance is Mine, I will repay," says the Lord.

— Romans 12:19, New King James Version

Part of this verse – "I will repay" or in older translations "vengeance is mine" ("Vengeance is mine, and recompense", in the English Standard Version) – is a quotation from Deuteronomy 32:35. Paul's instruction here is not to be vengeful: John Wycliffe and his colleagues translated it as "not defending yourselves" (Romans 12:19).

=== Verse 21 ===
Do not be overcome by evil, but overcome evil with good.

— Romans 12:21, New King James Version

This verse is a comprehensive summary of Romans 12:19–20, that is, "be not carried away to revenge and retaliation (verse 19) by evil which is committed against you, but overcome the evil by the good which you show to your enemy (verse 20), put to shame by your noble spirit, ceases to act malignantly against you and becomes your friend".

== See also ==
- Spiritual gift
- Related Bible parts: Deuteronomy 32, 1 Corinthians 12

== Bibliography ==
- Coogan, Michael David (2007). Coogan, Michael David; Brettler, Marc Zvi; Newsom, Carol Ann; Perkins, Pheme (eds.). The New Oxford Annotated Bible with the Apocryphal/Deuterocanonical Books: New Revised Standard Version, Issue 48 (Augmented 3rd ed.). Oxford University Press. ISBN 9780195288810.
- Hill, Craig C. (2007). "64. Romans". In Barton, John; Muddiman, John (eds.). The Oxford Bible Commentary (first (paperback) ed.). Oxford University Press. pp. 1083–1108. ISBN 978-0199277186.
