= Romans 11 =

- ← chapter 10 chapter 12 →
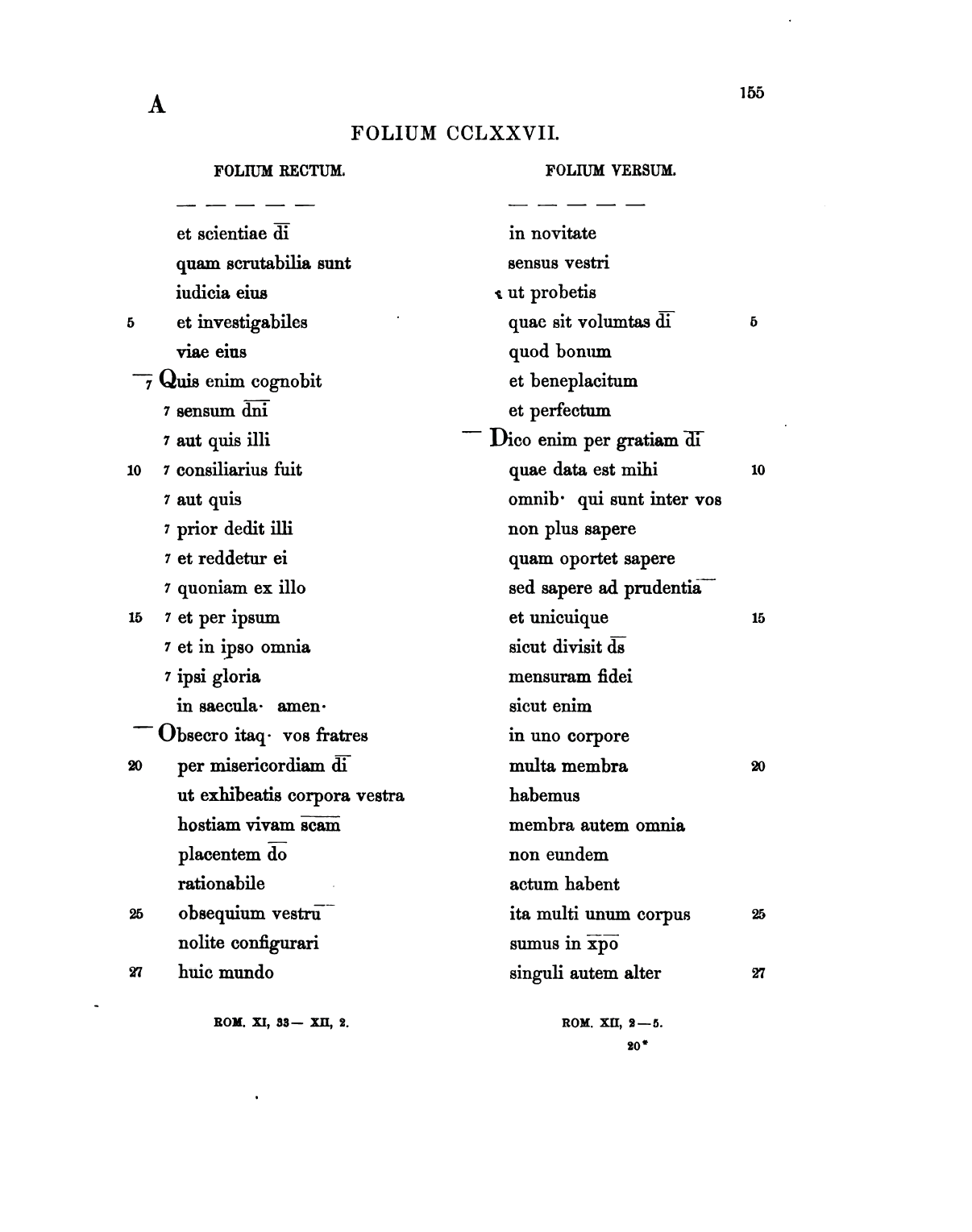
- Romans 11:33–12:5 on Tischendorf's edition of Codex Carolinus (Monumenta, p. 155)
- Book: Epistle to the Romans
- Category: Pauline epistles
- Christian Bible part: New Testament
- Order in the Christian part: 6

Romans 11 is the eleventh chapter of the Epistle to the Romans in the New Testament of the Christian Bible. It is authored by Paul the Apostle, while he was in Corinth in the mid-50s AD, with the help of an amanuensis (secretary), Tertius, who adds his own greeting in Romans 16:22.

This chapter concludes the section of the letter in which "St. Paul teaches us about the eternal providence of God" with particular reference to the election of a chosen people, Israel (Romans 9:11), who have become disobedient (Romans 11:31), and in whose place a remnant have been chosen (Romans 11:5) and grafted into place (Romans 11:17-24).

== Text ==
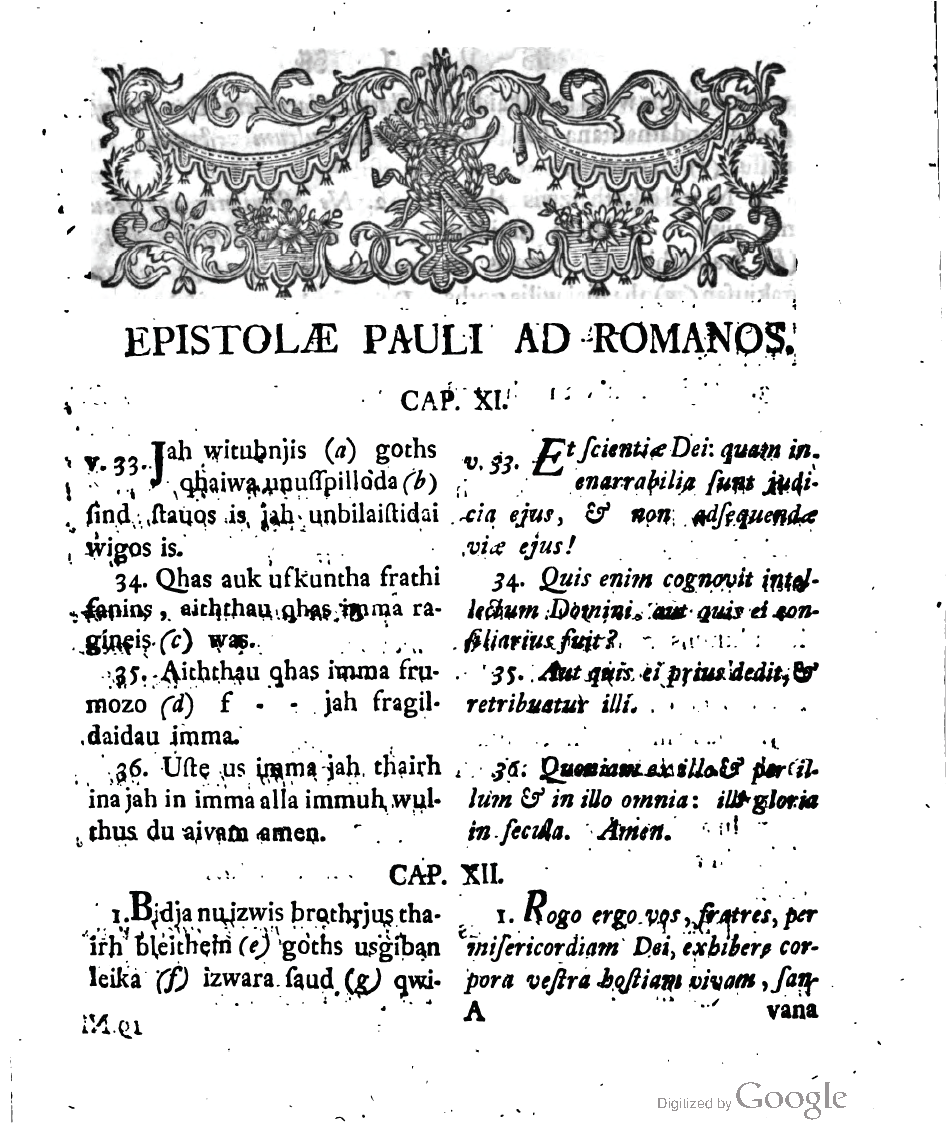
Romans 11:33–12:1 on Knittel's edition of Codex Carolinus.

The original text was written in Koine Greek. This chapter is divided into 36 verses.

=== Textual witnesses ===
Some early manuscripts containing the text of this chapter are:

- In Greek:
  - Codex Vaticanus (AD 325–350)
  - Codex Sinaiticus (330–360)
  - Codex Alexandrinus (400–440)
  - Codex Ephraemi Rescriptus (c. 450; extant verses 1–14)
- in Gothic language
  - Codex Carolinus (6th/7th century; extant verses 33–36)
- in Latin
  - Codex Carolinus (6th/7th century; extant verses 33–36)

=== Old Testament references ===
- Romans 11:1–2 references Psalm 94:14
- Romans 11:3 references 1 Kings 19:10,14
- Romans 11:4 references 1 Kings 19:18
- Romans 11:8 references Deuteronomy 29:4 and Isaiah 29:10 and Isaiah 6:9
- Romans 11:9–10 references Psalm 69:22, 23
- Romans 11:27 references Isaiah 59:20, 21
- Romans 11:34 references Isaiah 40:13, Wisdom 9:13 and Jeremiah 23:18
- Romans 11:35 references Job 41:11

=== New Testament references ===
- Romans 11:1 references Philippians 3:5
- Romans 11:34 references 1 Corinthians 2:16

== Has God rejected Israel? ==
Paul reiterates in verses 1-11 his answer to the same question in chapter 9, focussing here on other cases where a remnant has been preserved.

=== Verse 1 ===
I say then, has God cast away His people? Certainly not! For I also am an Israelite, of the seed of Abraham, of the tribe of Benjamin.

— Romans 11:1, New King James Version

Paul opens this part of his letter with another rhetorical question: "Has God cast away His people?" (Note: Cf. Romans 10: 18, 19 and Romans 11:11: But I ask ..., So I ask ...) He also uses the phrase "Certainly not!" or *God forbid" (μη γενοιτο, mē genoito) regularly in this letter. (Note: See Romans 6#The bearing of justification by grace upon a holy life) On this occasion, he puts himself forward as an example to evidence his argument, "to show that God has not rejected His people en masse. An Israelite of pure descent, he is, nevertheless a true believer". Later in the chapter (Romans 11:13), Paul also refers to himself as the "apostle of the gentiles" (εθνων αποστολος, ethnōn apostolos).

=== Verse 25–27 ===
For I do not desire, brethren, that you should be ignorant of this mystery, lest you should be wise in your own opinion, that blindness in part has happened to Israel until the fullness of the Gentiles has come in. And so all Israel will be saved, as it is written: "The Deliverer will come out of Zion, And He will turn away ungodliness from Jacob; For this is My covenant with them, When I take away their sins."

— Romans 11:25–27, New King James Version

Historian Paula Fredriksen reads these verses as Paul's attempt to explain why, by the middle of the first century AD, gentiles appeared to outnumber Jews in the Christ-following movement. She argues that Paul offered a reinterpretation of an apocalyptic prophecy: God has deliberately made most of Israel temporarily insensible to the gospel, so that apostles like Paul would have more time to reach gentiles across the nations. Only after the full complement of nations had been gathered in would God restore Israel's receptivity. For Paul, she contends, this was not a rejection of Jews, but a temporary postponement; God's promises to Israel remained irrevocable. She then traces how centuries later, Augustine of Hippo reinterpreted this same passage, arguing that "all Israel" referred not to actual Jews but to "spiritual Israel," meaning the church.

== Verse 34 ==
"For who has known the mind of the Lord? Or who has become His counselor?"

— Romans 11:34, New King James Version

Romans 34 cites both Isaiah 40:13 and Jeremiah 23:18.

== See also ==
- Abraham
- Baal
- Benjamin
- David
- Elijah
- Israel
- Zion
- Other related Bible parts: Deuteronomy 29, 1 Kings 19, Job 41, Psalm 69, Isaiah 40, Isaiah 59, Jeremiah 23

== Bibliography ==
- Coogan, Michael David (2007). Coogan, Michael David; Brettler, Marc Zvi; Newsom, Carol Ann; Perkins, Pheme (eds.). The New Oxford Annotated Bible with the Apocryphal/Deuterocanonical Books: New Revised Standard Version, Issue 48 (Augmented 3rd ed.). Oxford University Press. ISBN 978-0195288810.
- Hill, Craig C. (2007). "64. Romans". In Barton, John; Muddiman, John (eds.). The Oxford Bible Commentary (first (paperback) ed.). Oxford University Press. pp. 1083–1108. ISBN 978-0199277186.
