= Notker Hammerstein =

German historian (1930–2024)

Notker Hammerstein (3 October 1930 − 13 March 2024) was a German historian. His research interests were mainly in the field of University history and history of science as well as the history of the Holy Roman Empire of the German Nation.

== Life ==
Born in Offenbach am Main, Hammerstein was the son of the elementary school teacher August Hammerstein (1890–1976). He attended the Heinrich-von-Gagern-Gymnasium in Frankfurt and passed his Abitur there in 1949. He then studied economics and philosophy, later history, philosophy and English literature at the Goethe University Frankfurt and the Ludwig-Maximilians-Universität München. In 1956, he was appointed a Doctor in Frankfurt by Otto Vossler, then became a research assistant and from 1960 assistant at the Department of History. In 1968, he habilitated and obtained the venia legendi for Medieval and Modern History. In 1971, Hammerstein was appointed professor in the course of the new Hessian Higher Education Act and in 1973 he was appointed to a newly established Extraordinary Office for Early Modern History at the Goethe University Frankfurt. He became Emeritus in 1999. His brother Reinhold was professor for musicology at Heidelberg University, his brother Gerhard honorary professor for criminal law at the University of Freiburg.

In 1999, Hammerstein published a book on the history of the Deutsche Forschungsgemeinschaft during the Weimar Republic and the Third Reich. Ernst Klee called this book an "attempt at a clean slate", since Hammerstein described the work of the Nazi psychiatrist Robert Ritter as "general medical research", although he had divided the work of the Nazi psychiatrist into "full Gypsies", "Gypsy half-breeds" and "non-Gypsies" in his "expert opinions" in a racist manner.

Hammerstein died on 13 March 2024, at the age of 93.

== Memberships ==
- 1986: Election to the Scientific Advisory Board of Herzog August Library Wolfenbüttel, 1991–1996 Chairman of the Advisory Board.
- 1994: Elected to the Scientific Advisory Board of the Interdisciplinary Centre for the Study of the European Enlightenment at Martin Luther University Halle-Wittenberg.
- Four years deputy chairman of the German Society for the Study of the 18th Century.
- 1988 to 2006: German representative and vice chairman of the International Commission of the History of Universities in the International Association of Historians.

== Publications ==
- Jus und Historie. Ein Beitrag zur Geschichte des historischen Denkens an deutschen Universitäten im späten 17. und im 18. Jahrhundert. Vandenhoeck & Ruprecht, Göttingen 1972, ISBN 3-525-36151-3 (at the same time: Frankfurt am Main, Universität, Habilitation thesis, 1968).
- Aufklärung und katholisches Reich. Untersuchungen zur Universitätsreform und Politik katholischer Territorien des Heiligen Römischen Reiches deutscher Nation im 18. Jahrhundert. (Historische Forschungen. 12). Duncker & Humblot, Berlin 1977, ISBN 3-428-03948-3.
- Die Johann Wolfgang Goethe-Universität Frankfurt am Main.
  - Volume 1: Von der Stiftungsuniversität zur staatlichen Hochschule. 1914–1950. Alfred Metzner Verlag, Neuwied und Frankfurt am Main, 1989, ISBN 3-472-00107-0.
  - Volume 2: Nachkriegszeit und Bundesrepublik 1945–1972, Wallstein Verlag, Göttingen, 2012, ISBN 978-3-8353-0550-2.
  - Volume 3: Ihre Geschichte in den Präsidentenberichten 1972–2013, Wallstein Verlag, Göttingen, 2014 ISBN 978-3-8353-1592-1.
- Antisemitismus und deutsche Universitäten. 1871–1933. Campus, Frankfurt among others 1995, ISBN 3-593-35283-4.
- Handbuch der deutschen Bildungsgeschichte.
  - as publisher with August Buck: Vol 1: Von der Renaissance und der Reformation bis zum Ende der Glaubenskämpfe. Beck, Munich 1996, ISBN 3-406-32463-0;
  - as publisher with Ulrich Herrmann: Vol. 2: 18. Jahrhundert. Vom späten 17. Jahrhundert bis zur Neuordnung Deutschlands um 1800. Beck, Munich 2005, ISBN 3-406-32464-9.
- Die Deutsche Forschungsgemeinschaft in der Weimarer Republik und im Dritten Reich: Wissenschaftspolitik in Republik und Diktatur: 1920–1945. Beck, Munich 1999, ISBN 3-406-44826-7;
  - Ingo Haar: Rezension in H-Soz-u-Kult 25 September 2000 .
- Res publica litteraria. Ausgewählte Aufsätze zur frühneuzeitlichen Bildungs-, Wissenschafts- und Universitätsgeschichte (Historische Forschungen. 69). Edited by Ulrich Muhlack and Gerrit Walther. Duncker & Humblot, Berlin 2000, ISBN 3-428-09899-4.
