= Gerichtslinde =

Culturally significant Lime tree

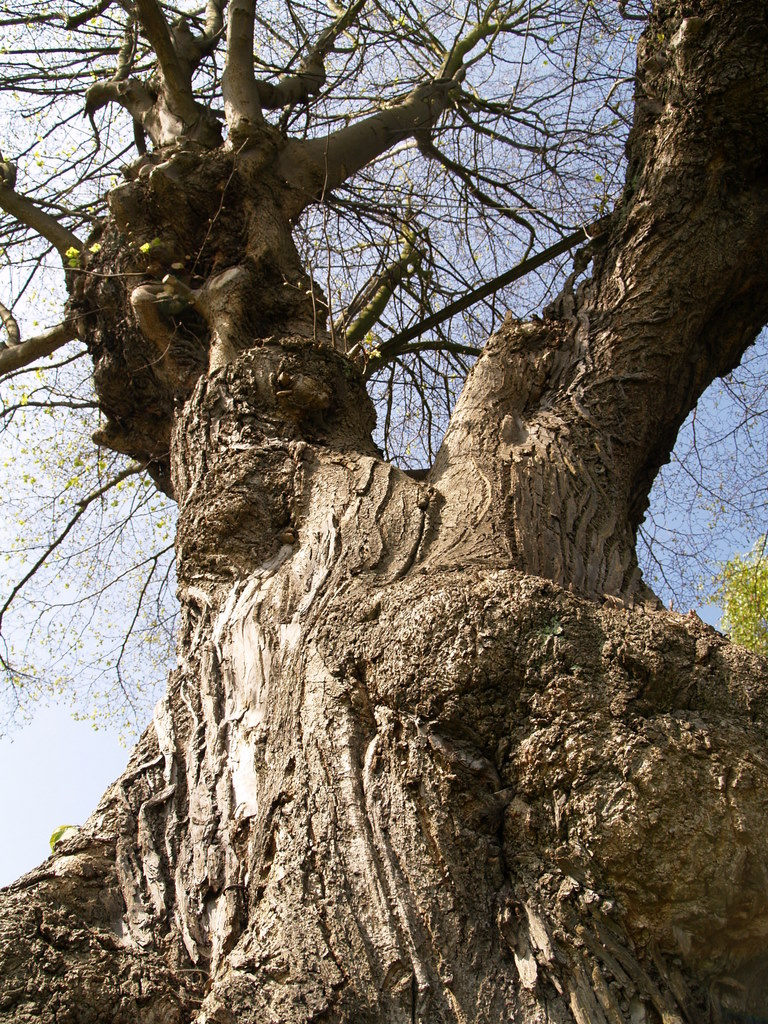
Gerichtslinde in Mönchengladbach

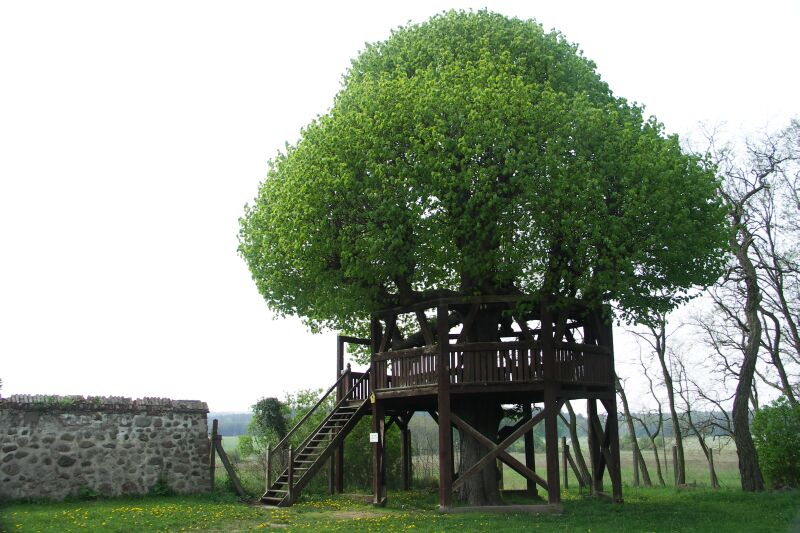
Tanzlinde in Galenbeck

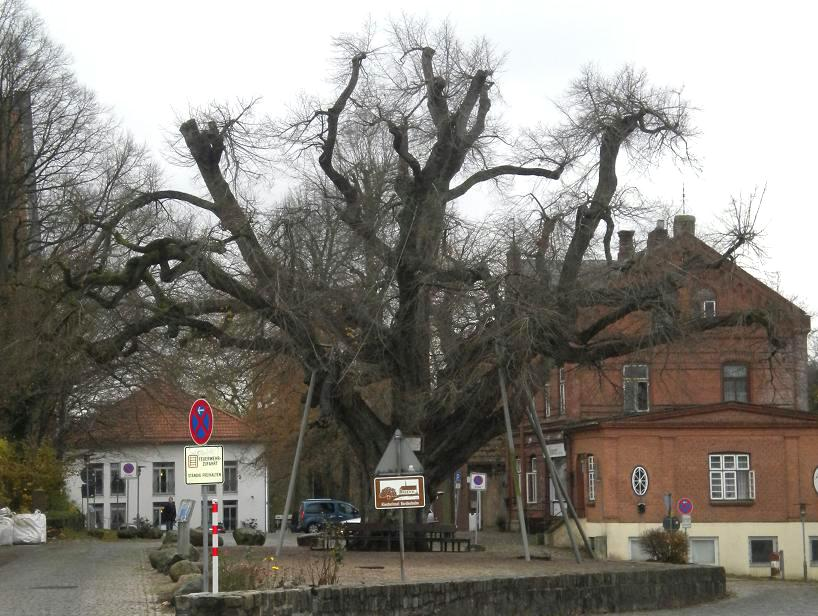
Bordesholm Gerichtslinde in November 2010

Himmelsberg Dance Linden, in the coat of arms of Himmelsberg village

In the Holy Roman Empire, a Gerichtslinde (German: [ɡəˈʁɪçtsˌlɪndə], "court linden"; plural -linden) was a linden tree where assemblies and judicial courts were held. Rooted in Germanic tribal law, the custom has left traces through the Germanic language-speaking areas.

Court lindens usually were situated outside settlements in open fields "under the free heaven". When located in the center of its village, the tree was also at the center of festivities, in this respect known as Tanzlinde "dance linden". After Christianization, the linden remained associated with justice and benevolent protection, often re-dedicated to Mary mother of Jesus (Marienlinden) or to the twelve Apostles (Apostellinden).

== History ==
Many surviving linden trees may sometimes retain names Thie-Linde, Thing-Linde or Tilly-Linde, but often simply Dorflinde "village linden". The oldest of them is in Schenklengsfeld, Hesse, planted in the 9th century, in the time of Louis the Younger.

The 12th century Visio Godeschalci describes a journey which the pious Holstein peasant Godeskalk believed he had made in the lower world. There is mentioned an immensely large and beautiful linden-tree hanging full of shoes, which were handed down to such dead travellers as had exercised mercy during their lives.

Numerous examples of sacred trees and groves exist amongst the pre-Christian Germanic peoples. The linden is often claimed to have been sacred to Freyja in the pre-Christian period, forming a polarity with the oaks sacred to Donar.

== Specimens ==
Notable specimens are found in Bargischow, Castell, Frankfurt am Main, Großgoltern, Herzogenreuth, Himmelsberg (Hesse), Hohenpölz, Kierspe, Müden an der Örtze, Neuenrade, Salzhemmendorf, Sachsenbrunn Schaumburg, Upstedt, Waldtann (Kreßberg) and Warmsen.

The Danish Open Air Museum in northern Copenhagen displays a reconstruction of such a village meeting place for a medieval-era village originally found on the island of Funen, Denmark. Each tenant farmer had his own stone seat beneath the linden and the meeting was presided over by the village elder (Danish: oldermand, cognate "alderman").

== See also ==
- Maypole
- Sacred grove
- Sacred trees and groves in Germanic paganism and mythology
- Trees in mythology

== Literature ==
- Lenzing, Anette: Gerichtslinden und Thingplätze in Deutschland. Königstein i. Ts. 2005 (= Die Blauen Bücher). ISBN 3-7845-4520-3
- Fischer-Rizzi, Susanne: Blätter von Bäumen. Legenden, Mythen, Heilanwendungen und Betrachtung von einheimischen Bäumen. Hugendubel, München, 1994. ISBN 3-88034-683-6
- Petruszek T., Das Buch der Bäume, Dreisam Verlag (1991).
