= Werner Gembruch =

German historian

Werner Gembruch (5 July 1918 − 15 July 1988) was a German historian.

== Life ==
Born in Würzburg, the son of a factory owner, Gembruch passed his Abitur at the Heinrich-von-Gagern-Gymnasium in Frankfurt am Main in 1937. Afterwards he performed Reich Labour Service for six months. He started a military career. In November 1942 he became a British prisoner of war in El-Alamein. He taught Latin in a so-called camp university. He studied history, German and philosophy at the Goethe University Frankfurt. His academic teacher was Otto Vossler. He received his doctorate in 1950 with a thesis on Otto von Bismarck. Gembruch was Vossler's assistant until 1956. In the meantime he had been promoted to major in the Bundeswehr. After the end of his assistant position he changed for financial reasons to the Military History Research Office in Freiburg im Breisgau. There he worked as a lifetime civil servant, among other things on the development of curricula for officer schools. However, he continued to publish scientific articles, especially in the journal Europäische Sicherheit & Technik.

Gembruch habilitated in Frankfurt in 1960 with a thesis on Heinrich Friedrich Karl vom und zum Stein. In view of his outstanding habilitation, the Faculty of Philosophy in Frankfurt offered him a postdoctoral lectureship. He thereupon decided to swap his secure career for the less lucrative and less secure career at the university. In the winter semester of 1960/61 he took up his teaching activities at the University of Frankfurt. In April 1965 he was appointed full professor there. Gembruch retired in 1986. With his work on Stein he presented a standard work. His most important essays were published in 1990 by Johannes Kunisch in a bundle. The studies deal with Prussian and French history from 1633 to 1831.

Gembruch died at the age of 70.

== Publications ==
- Gedanken zu Tolstois "Krieg und Frieden". (1957)
- Frankfurter historische Abhandlungen.
- Staat und Heer. Ausgewählte historische Studien zum Ancien Régime, zur Französischen Revolution und zu den Befreiungskriegen. (Historische Forschungen. Vol. 40). Herausgegeben von Johannes Kunisch. Duncker & Humblot, Berlin 1990, ISBN 3-428-06716-9.
- Freiherr vom Stein im Zeitalter der Restauration. (Schriften der Wissenschaftlichen Gesellschaft an der Johann-Wolfgang-Goethe-Universität. Vol. 2). Steiner, Wiesbaden 1960.

== Literature ==
- Peter Wende: "Werner Gembruch. Soldat und Historiker." In: Evelyn Brockhoff, Bernd Heidenreich und Michael Maaser (ed.): Frankfurter Historiker (Schriftenreihe des Frankfurter Universitätsarchivs. vol.. 6). Wallstein, Göttingen 2017, ISBN 3-8353-1749-0, pp. 169–185.
