= Otto Vossler =

German historian

Otto Vossler (14 February 1900 – 26 December 1987) was a German historian.

== Life ==
Born in Heidelberg, Vossler was the younger son of the Romanist Karl Vossler and his wife Ester Countess Gnoli, daughter of the Italian poet and literary historian Count Domenico Gnoli. Growing up in the bilingual parental home, Vossler could translate and publish after the death of his father his correspondence with the Italian anti-fascist Benedetto Croce. After the move of the family, Vossler attended the Maximiliansgymnasium München in Munich. He completed his studies at the Ludwig-Maximilians-Universität München in 1925 under Hermann Oncken with a doctorate on Mazzini's political thinking in the intellectual currents of his time. In 1929 he habilitated, also under Oncken, at the Humboldt University of Berlin with a study on the American revolutionary ideals under Thomas Jefferson. In 1930 he was appointed associate professor at Leipzig University, in 1938 he was appointed full professor (until 1945), and in 1946 he took over the chair of Medieval and Modern History, especially English and American History, at the Goethe University Frankfurt. He retired in 1967. Among his academic students was Werner Gembruch. In addition to the revolutionary movements of the 18th and 19th centuries, his research on Jean-Jacques Rousseau, Alexis de Tocqueville and the development of national thought were also important.

In 1942 he became a member of the Saxon Academy of Sciences and Humanities, and from 1945 until his death he was a corresponding member. From 1942 to 1944 he was Dean of the Philological-Historical Department of the Faculty of Philosophy at Leipzig University.

Vossler died in Frankfurt at the age of 85.

== Publications ==
- Mazzinis politisches Denken und Wollen in den geistigen Strömungen seiner Zeit. Oldenbourg, Munich, Berlin 1927.
- Die amerikanische Revolutionsideale in ihrem Verhältnis zu den europäischen. Untersucht an Thomas Jefferson. Oldenbourg, Munich 1929.
- Der Nationalgedanke von Rousseau bis Ranke. Oldenbourg, Munich, Berlin 1937.
- Geist und Geschichte. Von der Reformation bis zur Gegenwart. Gesammelte Aufsätze. Piper, Munich 1964.
- Die Revolution von 1848 in Deutschland. Suhrkamp, Frankfurt a. M. 1967; 8th edition 1985.
- Alexis de Tocqueville. Freiheit und Gleichheit. Klostermann, Frankfurt, 1973.
- Geschichte als Sinn. Suhrkamp, Frankfurt. 1979

== Literature ==
- Ulrich Muhlack: "Otto Vossler 14.2.1902 – 26.12.1987." In Historische Zeitschrift 247 (1988), pp. 214–216. (JSTOR Stable Link)
- Ulrich Muhlack: "Geschichte als Sinn. Otto Vossler." In Evelyn Brockhoff, Bernd Heidenreich and Michael Maaser (ed.): Frankfurter Historiker (Schriftenreihe des Frankfurter Universitätsarchivs. Vol. 6). Wallstein, Göttingen 2017, ISBN 3-8353-1749-0, pp. 145–168.
