= Gerrit Walther =

German historian (born 1959)

Gerrit Walther (born 15 February 1959) is a German historian.

== Life ==
Born Kiel, Walther studied literature, history and philosophy at the Goethe University Frankfurt from 1980 to 1986 and completed an editorial training course at a daily newspaper. His most important academic teachers were Ulrich Muhlack and Notker Hammerstein. From 1987 to 1997 Walther was a research assistant in Frankfurt. In 1992 he received his doctorate in Frankfurt am Main with a thesis on the historian and politician Barthold Niebuhr supervised by Ulrich Muhlack. The second and third reviewers of the work were Notker Hammerstein and Lothar Gall.

In the summer of 1993, Walther was awarded the Friedrich Sperl Prize of the Association of Friends and Sponsors of the Johann Wolfgang Goethe University Frankfurt. In 1997 he also completed his habilitation in Frankfurt with a thesis on the Fulda prince abbot Balthasar von Dernbach. In Frankfurt he also taught as a private lecturer for modern history. In 2000/2001 Walther held a chair for early modern history at the University of Giessen. Since 2002, he has been teaching in the succession of Hartwig Brandt as professor of early modern history at the Bergische Universität Wuppertal. He became Dean of the Faculty of Humanities and Cultural Studies in October 2008.

In 2006, Walther became a full member of the North Rhine-Westphalian Academy of Sciences, Humanities and the Arts. Since 2008 he has been a member of the Historical Commission at the Bavarian Academy of Sciences, and in 2012 he was elected President of the Commission to succeed Lothar Gall. On March 8, 2017, he was confirmed in office for another five years. In 2012, the Bavarian Academy of Sciences elected him as its corresponding member.

Walther's research focuses on the general history of the confessional age, the French history of the early modern period, the history of humanism and European education, the history of historiography and classical antiquity studies, and the aristocratic and court culture of the early modern period. Walther was a specialist editor for education in the Enzyklopädie der Neuzeit and is a specialist representative for early modern times on the editorial board of The Historical Journal.

== Writings ==
Monographs

- Julius Maria Becker 1887–1949. Ein Dichter zwischen den Weltkriegen. Battert, Baden-Baden 1989, ISBN 3-87989-160-5.
- Niebuhrs Forschung. (Frankfurter historische Abhandlungen. Vol. 35). Steiner, Stuttgart 1993, ISBN 3-515-06369-2 (Zugleich: Frankfurt Universität, Dissertation, 1991).
- Abt Balthasars Mission. Politische Mentalitäten, Gegenreformation und eine Adelsverschwörung im Hochstift Fulda. (Schriftenreihe der Historischen Kommission bei der Bayerischen Akademie der Wissenschaften. Vol. 67). Vandenhoeck und Ruprecht, Göttingen 2002, ISBN 3-525-36060-6 (Zugleich: Frankfurt, Universität Habilitations-Schrift, 1997) (Numerised).

Editor

- with Notker Hammerstein: Ulrich Muhlack: Staatensystem und Geschichtsschreibung. Ausgewählte Aufsätze zu Humanismus und Historismus, Absolutismus und Aufklärung. (Historische Forschungen. Vol. 83). Duncker & Humblot, Berlin 2006, ISBN 978-3-428-12025-3.
- with Michael Maaser: Notker Hammerstein: Geschichte als Arsenal. Ausgewählte Aufsätze zu Reich, Hof und Universitäten der Frühen Neuzeit. (Schriftenreihe des Frankfurter Universitätsarchivs. Vol. 3). Wallstein, Göttingen 2010, ISBN 978-3-8353-0798-8.

== Literature ==
- Gerrit Walther. In: Bayerische Akademie der Wissenschaften, Jahrbuch 2012, Munich 2013, p. 203–204.
- Matei Chihaia, Georg Eckert (ed.): Kolossale Miniaturen. Festschrift für Gerrit Walther. Münster 2019, ISBN 3-402-13411-X.
