= Minuscule 126 =

- New Testament manuscript
- Name: Guelferbytanus XVI. 16 (Guelf. 16.16)
- Text: Gospels
- Date: 12th century
- Script: Greek
- Now at: Herzog August Bibliothek
- Size: 21 cm by 15.5 cm
- Type: Byzantine text-type
- Category: V
- Hand: carelessly written
- Note: marginalia

Minuscule 126 (in the Gregory-Aland numbering), ε 185 (Von Soden numbering). It is a Greek minuscule manuscript of the New Testament, written on parchment. Palaeographically it has been assigned to the 12th century. It has complex contents with full marginalia.

== Description ==
The manuscript contains a complete text of the four Gospels on 219 parchment leaves (21 cm by 15.5 cm). The text is written in one column per page, 26 lines per page. Matthew 28:18-20 is written in cruciform. The capital letters are often occur in the middle of words. According to F. H. A. Scrivener the manuscript was carelessly written.

The text is divided according to the κεφαλαια (chapters) whose numbers are given at the margin, and their τιτλοι (titles of chapters) at the top of the pages. There is also a division according to the smaller Ammonian Sections (in Mark 241 - 16:20), with references to the Eusebian Canons (written below Ammonian Section numbers).

It contains the Eusebian Canon tables at the beginning, prolegomena, tables of the κεφαλαια (tables of contents) before each Gospel, pictures, lectionary markings (added by later hand), synaxaria (later hand), and some corrections added by a later hand .

== Text ==
The Greek text of the codex is a representative of the Byzantine text-type. Hermann von Soden classified it to the textual family K^{x}. Aland placed it in Category V.

According to the Claremont Profile Method it represents textual family K^{x} in Luke 1, Luke 10, and Luke 20.

The text is of an unusual character.

== History ==
The manuscript was examined by Heusinger (1752), Birch, Franz Anton Knittel, and Tischendorf. Knittel called it Codex Guelpherbytanus (E). Scrivener called it Codex 126 in the Gospels and thought it to be 11th Century.

C. R. Gregory saw it in 1891.

Currently, the codex is located at the Herzog August Bibliothek (Theol. Gr. 60) at Wolfenbüttel.

== See also ==
- List of New Testament minuscules
- Biblical manuscript
