= Carla Falluomini =

Italian philologist (born 1970)

Carla Falluomini (born 1970) is an Italian philologist who specializes on Gothic and Lombardic palaeography, languages and cultures. She is currently professor at the University of Perugia.

== Biography ==
Carla Falluomini was born in 1970 in Ferrara. In 1999, she gave a new collation for Gothic text of Codex Carolinus; the first collation of the codex was made by Franz Anton Knittel in 1762, who had made some errors.

Falluomini taught Germanic philology at the University of Turin. Since 2006, she has been involved in an international project to publish a new critical edition of the Gothic Bible. In 2010, she was the UNESCO contact person for the inclusion of the Codex Argenteus in the UNESCO World Heritage List.

== Works ==
- Der sogenannte Codex Carolinus von Wolfenbüttel. (Codex Guelferbytanus 64 Weissenburgensis). Mit besonderer Berücksichtigung der gotisch-lateinischen Blätter (255, 256, 277, 280), Wolfenbütteler Mittelalter-Studien, Wiesbaden (1999). ISBN 3-447-04230-3
- Sagitho und nicht sautho. Zu 1 Kor. 15,2 in der gotischen Bibel, ZfdA 133 (2004) 75–79
- Textkritische Anmerkungen zur Gotischen Bibel Annali della Facoltà di Lingue e Letterature Straniere 5, 2005 (2009), pp. 311–320.
- Kodikologische Bemerkungen über die Handschriften der Goten (2006), p. 3-37
- The Gothic version of the Gospels and Pauline epistles: cultural background, transmission and character, Arbeiten zur neutestamentlichen Textforschung, Berlin (2015). ISBN 978-3-11-055273-7
