= Minuscule 97 =

- New Testament manuscript
- Text: Acts of the Apostles, Pauline epistles
- Date: 12th century
- Script: Greek language
- Now at: Herzog August Bibliothek
- Size: 18 cm by 13.5 cm
- Type: Byzantine text-type
- Category: V

Minuscule 97 (in the Gregory-Aland numbering), α 260 (von Soden), is a Greek language minuscule manuscript of the New Testament, on parchment leaves. Palaeographically it has been assigned to the 12th century. The manuscript is lacunose. Formerly it was labelled by 97^{a} and 241^{p}.

== Description ==
The codex contains a complete text of the Acts of the Apostles, Catholic epistles, and Pauline epistles on 204 leaves (size 18 cm by 13.5 cm) with only one lacuna (Acts 16:39-17:18). The text is written in one column per page, 27 lines per page.

It contains the Euthalian Apparatus, subscriptions at the end of each book, numbers of στιχοι, Synaxarion, Menologion, and αναγνωσεις (lessons) at the margin. It has marginal scholia from Chrysostom and Œcumenius.

The Greek text of the codex is a representative of the Byzantine text-type. Kurt Aland placed it in Category V.

== History ==
Formerly the manuscript was deposited by one Theodoret in the Catechumens library of the Great Lavra monastery on Mount Athos. It came from Athos to Germany. The text of the manuscript was collated by Langer, librarian at Wolfenbüttel, for Griesbach. C. R. Gregory did not see this manuscript.

Formerly it was labelled by 97^{a} and 241^{p}. In 1908 Gregory gave for it number 97.

It is currently housed at the Herzog August Bibliothek (Codd. Gud. Graec. 104.2), at Wolfenbüttel.

== See also ==
- List of New Testament minuscules
- Biblical manuscript
- Textual criticism
