= Codex Guelferbytanus B =

Uncial 026
- New Testament manuscript
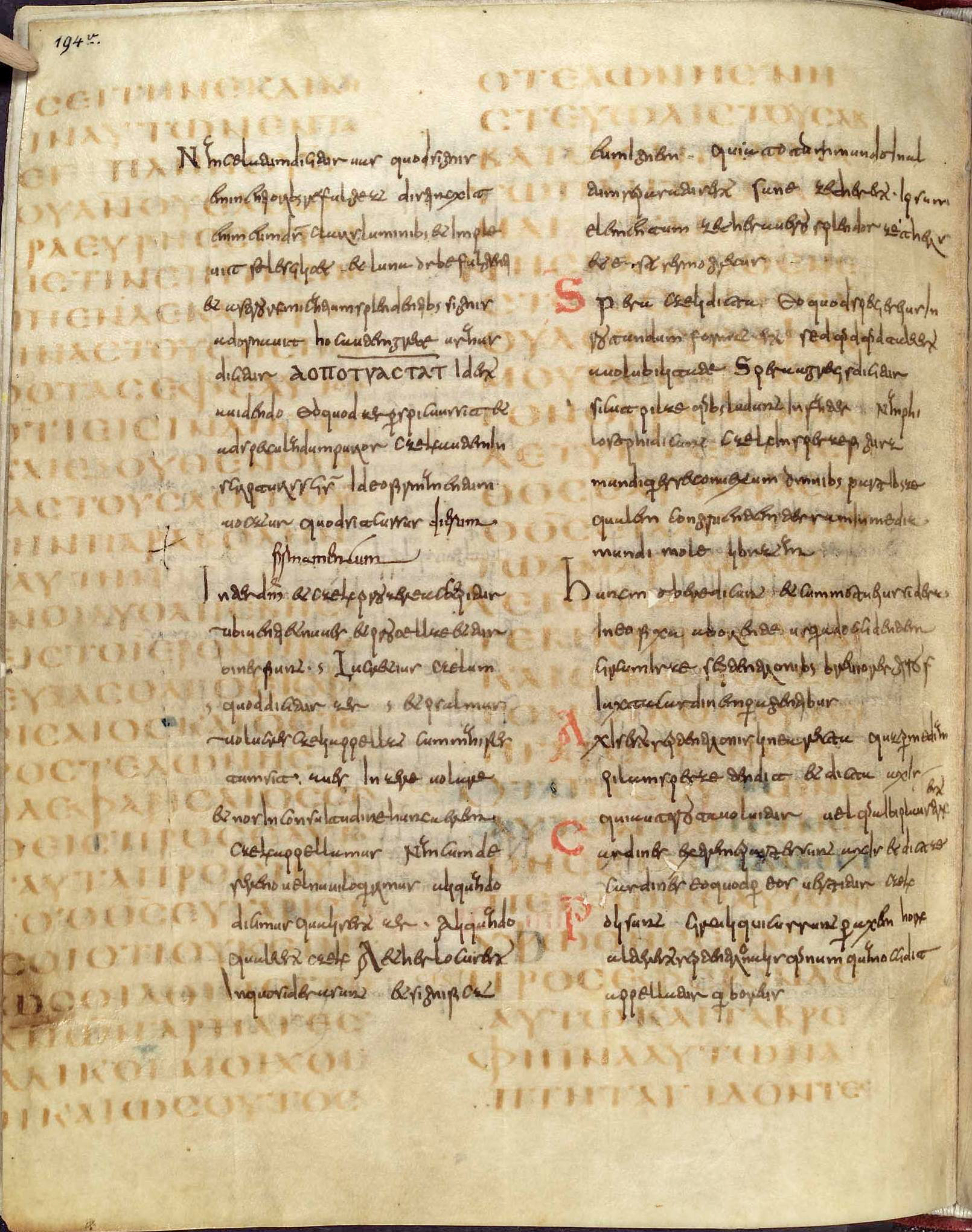
- Folio 194 verso
- Name: Guelferbytanus B
- Sign: Q
- Text: Luke, John
- Date: 5th century
- Script: Greek
- Found: 18th century
- Now at: Wolfenbüttel
- Size: 26.5 cm by 21.5 cm
- Type: Byzantine text-type
- Category: V

Codex Guelferbytanus B, ("Wolfenbüttel Codex B"), designated by Q or 026 (in the Gregory-Aland numbering), ε 4 (von Soden), is a Greek uncial manuscript of the Gospels, dated palaeographically to the 5th century. It is a palimpsest.

== Contents ==
These are the Gospel of Luke 4:34-5:4, 6:10-26, 12:6-43, 15:14-31, 17:34-18:15, 18:34-19:11, 19:47-20:17, 20:34-21:8, 22:27-46, 23:30-49; and Gospel of John 12:3-20, 14:3-22.

== Description ==
The codex contains text of the Gospels in a fragmentary condition on 13 parchment leaves (26.5 cm by 21.5 cm). It is written in two columns per page, 28 lines per column, in large uncial letters. The letters Θ, Ε, Ο, Σ are compressed, a departure from the very ancient forms. The text is divided according to the Ammonian Sections, whose numbers are given at the margin, but references to the Eusebian Canons are absent. It is speculated that references to the Eusebian Canons were written in red.

The nomina sacra are written in an abbreviated way. N ephelkystikon occurs (e.g. τηρησεν in John 12:7).

It is a palimpsest, with many verses illegible. The upper text of the codex is the Latin text Isidore of Seville's Origins and letters, as in the Codex Guelferbytanus A. The whole book is known as Codex Guelferbytanus 64 Weissenburgensis.

== Text ==
The Greek text of this codex is a representative of the Byzantine text-type, with a number (about 20%) of an alien readings (usually Alexandrian), which stand in a close agreement with the later Alexandrian witnesses L, 33, 579). According to Kurt and Barbara Aland it agrees 5 times with the Byzantine text against the original, it does not support original text against the Byzantine, it agrees with both 5 times. It has 2 independent or distinctive readings. Alands placed it in Category V.

According to the Claremont Profile Method it has mixed text in Luke 20.

According to Scrivener the codex agrees with codices AB united 50 times, sides with B against A 38 times, accords with A against B in 75 places.

In John 12:4 it reads λεγει ουν εις των μαθητων αυτου Ιουδας Σιμωνος Ισκαριωτης;

John 12:5 πτωχοις ] τοις πτωχοις
John 12:6 ειπεν δε τουτο ουχ οτι ] omitted
John 12:6 εβασταζεν ] εβαωζεν
John 12:7 τηρηση ] τηρησεν
John 12:9 εγνω ουν ο οχλος πολυς ] εγνω ουν οχλος πολυς
John 12:12 ο ] omitted
John 12:13 — ] λεγοντες
John 12:16 αυτου οι μαθηται ] οι μαθηται αυτου
John 12:19 ειπαν ] ειπον
John 12:19 ο κοσμος ] ο κοσμος ολος

== History ==
The manuscript was discovered in the 18th century by Franz Anton Knittel (1721–1792) in the Ducal Library of Wolfenbüttel.

The history of the codex is linked with Guelferbytanus A. It was examined, collated, and edited by Constantin von Tischendorf. The codex is located in Wolfenbüttel Herzog August Bibliothek (Weissenburg 64).

== See also ==
- List of New Testament uncials
- Textual criticism
- Codex Carolinus
