= Michael Maaser =

German historian

Michael Maaser (born 12 February 1964) is a German historian, archivist of the Goethe University Frankfurt.

== Life ==
Born in Steinheim in Hanau, Maaser graduated from the Hohe Landesschule gymnasium. He studied history at the Goethe University Frankfurt. On a scholarship of the Gerda Henkel Stiftung, he further studied in Düsseldorf.

During his studies and afterwards, Maaser worked as a research assistant in Frankfurt at the university's archive, directed by Notker Hammerstein, and became his successor. He achieved a doctorate in philosophy from the Department of Philosophy and Historical Sciences. Maaser taught Modern History in Frankfurt from 2002/03. He habilitated in 2015 and since then has been teaching as a private lecturer.

== Memberships ==
- Scientific member of the Historische Kommission für Hessen.
- Member of the Executive Board of the Deutsche Akademie für Kulinaristik.
- Chairman of the scientific advisory board of the Bibliographia Judaica Archive
- Member of the Frankfurter Historische Kommission
- Member of the working group "Die Universität Frankfurt im Nationalsozialismus" (seit Mai 2017)
- Chairman of the Monument Advisory Board of the City of Hanau.
- Chairman of the home and history association Steinheim am Main from 2009 to 2014.
- former chairman of the sponsoring association of the Theodor-Heuss-School Hanauu

== Writings ==
As author:

- Elisabeth Langgässer und Heinrich Ellermanns "Blätter für die Dichtung". In Karlheinz Müller (ed.), Elisabeth Langgässer. Ein Colloquium aus Anlaß ihres 90. Geburtstages. Darmstadt 1989.
- Andreas Riems literarisches Werk. In Karl H.L. Welker (ed.), Andreas Riem. Ein Europäer aus der Pfalz. (Schriften der Siebenpfeiffer-Stiftung, vol. 6.) Stuttgart 1999, pp. 37–49.
- Promotionen an der Universität Helmstedt im 16. und 17. Jahrhundert. In Rainer A. Müller (ed.): Promotionen und Promotionswesen an deutschen Hochschulen der Frühmoderne. (Abhandlungen zum Studenten- und Hochschulwesen. vol. 10.) Cologne 2001, pp. 111–117.
- "Mich zog es zu den Roten, weil nur sie den Kampf gegen die Nazis ernsthaft und kompromißlos führten." Die Frankfurter Studienjahre der "roten Gräfin" Marion Dönhoff. In: Forschung Frankfurt 3/2002, pp. 96–97.
- "Aber was war ich schon? Ein Student, der Betriebswirtschaft lernen wollte, aber von volkswirtschaftlichem Eifer besessen war." Ludwig Erhard und sein Studium beim Nationalökonom Franz Oppenheimer. In Forschung Frankfurt 3/2002, pp. 97–98.
- "Philosophie ist das Allerernsteste, aber so ernst auch wieder nicht." Theodor Adorno – einer der wichtigsten deutschen Denker hat 100. Geburtstag. In UniReport vom 12 February 2003, p. 3.
- Eine Brücke über dieSenckenberganlage. Adorno und die Universität Frankfurt. In Forschung Frankfurt 3–4/2003, pp. 48–51.
- Das Standbild des Heiligen Johannes von Nepomuk am Alten Friedhof Steinheim (Kleine Beiträge ... 8). Hanau 2003.
- Die erste Stiftungsuniversität Deutschlands. Die Universität Frankfurt setzte von Anfang an Akzente. In UniReport dated 4 February 2004, p. 3.
- Bescheidener Start in eine große Zukunft. Nach Gründung der Universität zogen die Studenten in den Krieg statt in den Hörsaal. Studentische Selbstverwaltung war von Anfang an selbstverständlich. In UniReport dated 15 April 2004, p. 3.
- „Restlose Reinigung von den Schlacken des liberalistischen Geistes“. Die Universität Frankfurt im Dritten Reich: Kein Aktiver Widerstand der Professoren. In Forschung Frankfurt 2/2004, pp. 46–50.
- Frankfurter Studenten zwischen 1914 und 1959: Das Wechselvolle des Politischen. Schon die Gründer der Stiftungsuniversität förderten studentisches Engagement. In Forschung Frankfurt 3–4/2004, pp. 84–88.
- Studieren in Frankfurt 1914–2004. Eine Ausstellung des Universitätsarchivs Frankfurt am Main im Auftrag des Präsidiums der Johann Wolfgang Goethe-Universität (Faltblatt) 2004.
- Studium und Doktorpromotion an der Universität Helmstedt im späten 16. Jahrhundert, in Rainer A. Müller (ed.): Bilder – Daten – Promotionen. Studien zum Promotionswesen an deutschen Universitäten der frühen Neuzeit. (Pallas Athene 24.) Stuttgart 2007.
- Justus Mösers Werk als bürgerliches Bildungsgut, in Karl H.L. Welker (ed.): Vom Ursprung der anwaltlichen Selbstverwaltung. Justus Möser und die Advokatur. Göttingen 2007, pp. 15–34.
- Die Frankfurter Studenten im "Dritten Reich", in Jan-Otmar Hesse, Jörn Kobes (ed.): Frankfurter Wissenschaftler 1933–1945. Göttingen 2008.
- Von der Wallfahrt in Steinheim zur Wallfahrt nach Steinheim, in Norbert Kemmerer (ed.): Jubiläumsschrift 700 Jahre Steinheimer Kreuzwallfahrt 1309–2009. Hanau-Steinheim 2009, pp. 41–47.
- Tafelfreuden bilden: Erasmus' Traktat über Kindererziehung, in Zeitsprünge. Forschungen zur Frühen Neuzeit 13 (2009), Heft 3/4, Frankfurt 2009, pp. 488–496.
- "Der Heros der Wissenschaft kam mir entgegen." Goethe, Carl Caesar Leonhard und Hanau, in Regina Kaiser, Ute Peukert (ed.), Vom Kupferstich zum Kirchenfenster, Marburg 2010.
- Humanismus und Landesherrschaft. Herzog Julius (1528–1589) und die Universität Helmstedt. (Frankfurter Historische Abhandlungen 46.) Stuttgart (Franz Steiner Verlag) 2010.
- Einige Steinheimer Geschichtsforscher und ihre Werke, in: Norbert Kemmerer, Michael Maaser (ed.), Friedensdenkmal – Geschichtsverein – Johannisfeuer. Festschrift 1911–2011. (STJb 6.) Hanau 2011, pp. 39–44.
- Vom Denkmal zum Mahnmal. 100 Jahre Steinheimer Friedensdenkmal, eine Dokumentation (together with Norbert Kemmerer und Ernst Henke), in Norbert Kemmerer, Michael Maaser (ed.), Friedensdenkmal – Geschichtsverein – Johannisfeuer. Festschrift 1911–2011. (STJb 6.) Hanau 2011, pp. 13–26.
- Stadt, Universität, Archiv. Das Archiv der Johann Wolfgang Goethe-Universität Frankfurt am Main, in Biuletyn Polskiej Misji Historycznej 6 (2011), pp. 155–165.
- Lesen, in Michael Maaser/Gerrit Walther (ed.): Bildung. Ziele und Formen, Traditionen und Systeme, Medien und Akteure. Stuttgart (Metzler Verlag) 2011, pp. 81–84.
- Dokumente zu Hermann Strasburger im Universitätsarchiv Frankfurt, in Frank Bernstein und Hartmut Leppin (ed.): Wiederanfang und Ernüchterung in der Nachkriegszeit. Dem Althistoriker Hermann Strasburger in memoriam. (Schriftenreihe des Frankfurter Universitätsarchivs, vol. 4.) Göttingen (Wallstein) 2013, pp. –45.
- "Dem Archiv verschrieben" Das Universitätsarchiv Frankfurt – Schatzkammer und Gedächtnis der Universität. In Michael Maaser und Wolfgang Schopf (ed.): Schatzkammer und Gedächtnis (Bögen des Universitätsarchivs Frankfurt II). Frankfurt 2013, pp. 4–8.
- 1914 (Bögen des Universitätsarchivs Frankfurt III). Frankfurt 2013.
- HUNDERT. Die Goethe-Universität in 100 Dingen. Frankfurt 2014.
- Frankfurter Universitätsgründung und Erster Weltkrieg, in Frank Estelmann und Bernd Zegowitz (ed.): Literaturwissenschaften in Frankfurt 1914–1945 (Schriftenreihe des Frankfurter Universitätsarchivs, vol. 7.) Göttingen (Wallstein) 2017, S. 21–29.
- Stifter werden Freunde. Die Geschichte der Freundesvereinigung der Goethe-Universität Frankfurt. Frankfurt 2018.
- Bürgertum und Antike im 18. Jahrhundert (together with Andreas Fahrmeir), in Joachim Jacob und Johannes Süßmann (ed.): Das 18. Jahrhundert. Lexikon zur Antikerezeption in Aufklärung und Klassizismus. Stuttgart 2018, pp. 105–112.
- Goethe als zweiter Mann im Staat: Carl August, Goethe und das Geheime Consilium ab 1775, in Matei Chihaia und Georg Eckert (ed.): Kolossale Miniaturen. Festschrift für Gerrit Walther. Münster 2019, pp. 12–22.
- Universität und Studierende. Die studentische Beteiligung an der Universität Frankfurt von ihrer Gründung bis in die 1930er Jahre., Göttingen (i. Vb.).

As editor:

- Michael Maaser (ed.), Stadt, Universität, Archiv., Göttingen: Wallstein Verlag 2009.
- Notker Hammerstein, Geschichte als Arsenal. Ausgewählte Aufsätze zu Reich, Hof und Universitäten der Frühen Neuzeit, edited by Michael Maaser and Gerrit Walther. (Schriftenreihe des Frankfurter Universitätsarchivs Band 3.), Göttingen 2010.
- Norbert Kemmerer, Michael Maaser (ed.), Friedensdenkmal – Geschichtsverein – Johannisfeuer. Festschrift 1911–2011. (STJb 6.), Hanau 2011.
- Michael Maaser, Gerrit Walther (ed.), Bildung. Ziele und Formen, Traditionen und Systeme, Medien und Akteure. Stuttgart 2011.
- Evelyn Brockhoff, Bernd Heidenreich, Michael Maaser (ed.), Frankfurter Historiker, Göttingen: Wallstein Verlag 2017.
