= Minuscule 429 =

- New Testament manuscript
- Name: Guelferbytanus XVI. 7
- Text: New Testament (except Gospels)
- Date: 14th/15th century
- Script: Greek
- Now at: Herzog August Bibliothek
- Size: 22.5 cm by 16 cm
- Type: mixed, Byzantine
- Category: III, V

Minuscule 429 (in the Gregory-Aland numbering), α 398 (in the Soden numbering), is a Greek minuscule manuscript of the New Testament, on cotton paper. Palaeographically it has been assigned to the 14th century (Apocalypse – 15th century).

== Description ==
The codex contains the text of the New Testament except Gospels on 204 paper leaves (22.5 cm by 16 cm). It is written in one column per page, in 29 lines per page. The leaves are arranged in quarto. It contains Prolegomena and many marginal readings.

The order of books: Acts of the Apostles, Pauline epistles, Catholic epistles, and Book of Revelation.

It contains the Comma Johanneum added by a later hand.

== Text ==
The Greek text of the Acts of the Apostles and the Catholic epistles Aland placed in Category III. It exhibits a remarkable text. The text of the Pauline epistles and Apocalypse is a representative of the Byzantine text-type. Aland placed it in Category V. In the Pauline epistles, the text is close to the codices 206, 522, 1891, and 2815.

In Acts 12:25 it reads εξ Ιερουσαλημ εις Αντιοχειαν (from Jerusalem to Antioch) along with 945, 1739, e, p, syr^{p}, cop^{sa} geo; majority reads εις Ιερουσαλημ (to Jerusalem);

In 2 Timothy 2:14 it reads Χριστου (of Christ) for θεοῦ (of God) along with 206, 1758.

== History ==
Acts and epistles were written by George, a monk in the 14th century (Scrivener 13th century). The Apocalypse was added later in the 14th or 15th century.

The manuscript was examined by Franz Anton Knittel in 1773 (who called it Codex Guelpherbytanus C), Matthaei (designated by X), and Franz Delitsch. C. R. Gregory saw it in 1891. Formerly it was labelled as Scrivener's Act. 69. Later, it was known as 69^{a}, 74^{p}, and 30^{r}. In 1908, Gregory gave the number 429 to it.

The manuscript is currently housed at the Herzog August Bibliothek (Codd. Aug. Quarto 16.7.4) in Wolfenbüttel.

== See also ==
- List of New Testament minuscules
- Biblical manuscript
- Textual criticism
