= Visio Godeschalci =

Visio Godeschalci is a 12th-century text relating the vision of a peasant of Harrie, now Großharrie in Holstein, named Gottschalk. In December 1189, during the siege of Segeberg castle, Gottschalk fell ill, and during five days was presumed dead.

His visions were recorded by two authors, surviving in two distinct but congruent accounts, both in Latin, an extensive one (text A: Godeschalcus) and a shorter one (text B: Visio Godeschalci).

== Two versions ==
=== Godeschalcus ===
The longer text presumably dates to between August and October 1190. The author presumably was a canon of Neumünster monastery, originally from Lower Saxony, and shows literary and philosophical education. In the section on purgatory, the author adds observations on current events, incidentally doubling as a primary source of everyday and legal affairs of the late 12th century Holy Roman Empire.

=== Visio Godeschalci ===
The author of the shorter version was presumably the priest of Nortorf. It is uncertain whether he had access to the longer text. The text is an account in the first person. This version is mentioned by Caesarius von Heisterbach in his Dialogus miraculorum.

=== Manuscripts ===
- Wolfenbüttel, Herzog-August-Bibliothek, Cod. 558 Helst., 1v-24r (Autograph)
- Hannover, Niedersächsische Landesbibliothek, Ms. XXIII 163, f.1-81

== The vision ==
The vision shows the influence both of local folklore and of Christian mythology.

Gottschalk experiences separation from his body and is received to the afterlife by two angels. He is shown a vision of purgatory, where he recognizes several prominent deceased atoning for their sins. He then sees Heavenly Jerusalem, but is not allowed to set foot in it. Instead, he returns to his body.

== Modern editions ==
- Erwin Assman: Godeschalcus und Visio Godeschalci. (Quellen und Forschungen zur Geschichte Schleswig-Holsteins, 74) Neumünster 1979 ISBN 3-529-02174-1

== Bibliography ==
- Enno Bünz: Visio Godeschalci/Godeschalcus. In: Verfasserlexikon, 10, Sp. 404-408
- Peter Dinzelbacher: Visio Godesc(h)alci. In: Lexikon des Mittelalters 8, Sp. 1731
- Hedwig Röckelein: Otloh, Gottschalk, Tnugdal: Individuelle und kollektive Visionsmuster des Hochmittelalters. (Europäische Hochschulschriften. Reihe III. Geschichte und Hilfswissenschaften. Bd. 319) Dissertation Tübingen. Frankfurt am Main 1987.
