= Ulrich Muhlack =

German historian

Ulrich Muhlack (born 3 October 1940) is a German historian.

== Life ==
Born in Königsberg, From 1960 to 1965 Muhlack studied history and Latin at the Goethe University Frankfurt and the University of Göttingen. In 1965 he passed the first Staatsexamen for the teaching profession at grammar schools. The following year he received his doctorate in Frankfurt with a dissertation on "France in the politics of the Prussian statesman Wilhelm von Humboldt". From 1972 he was professor for general historical methodology and History of Historiography at the University of Frankfurt am Main. He retired in the summer semester of 2006. Among others Gerrit Walther belonged to Muhlack's academic students. On his 65th birthday he was honored with the publication of his writings in the form of an anthology. The volume brings together a total of 14 essays by Muhlack, which were published between 1978 and 2004.

Muhlack has intensively studied the theory of history and the historiography of humanism (especially the example of Beatus Rhenanus). His 1991 synthesis Historical Science in Humanism and the Enlightenment. Die Vorgeschichte des Historismus is considered his most important monographic publication. At present he is working on an edition of the correspondence between the Bavarian Academy of Sciences and Leopold von Ranke.

== Writings ==
Monographs

- Das zeitgenössische Frankreich in der Politik Humboldts. (Historische Studien. H. 400). Matthiesen, Lübeck/Hamburg 1967 (Dissertation, Universität Franckfurt, 1966).
- with Ada Neschke-Hentschke: Einführung in die Geschichte der klassischen Philologie. Wissenschaftliche Buchgesellschaft, Darmstadt 1972, ISBN 3-534-05671-X.
- Geschichtswissenschaft im Humanismus und in der Aufklärung. Die Vorgeschichte des Historismus. Beck, Munich 1991, ISBN 3-406-35091-7.
- with Hubert Wolf, Dominik Burkard: Rankes „Päpste“ auf dem Index. Dogma und Historie im Widerstreit (Römische Inquisition und Indexkongregation. Vol. 3). Schöningh, Paderborn/München/Wien/Zürich 2003, ISBN 3-506-77674-6.
- Staatensystem und Geschichtsschreibung. Ausgewählte Aufsätze zu Humanismus und Historismus, Absolutismus und Aufklärung (Historische Forschungen. Vol. 83). Edited by Notker Hammerstein and Gerrit Walther. Duncker und Humblot, Berlin 2006, ISBN 3-428-12025-6.

Publishing

- Leopold von Ranke: Die grossen Mächte / Politisches Gespräch. Ed., kommentiert und mit einem Nachwort versehen von Ulrich Muhlack. Insel, Frankfurt/Leipzig 1995, ISBN 3-458-33476-9.
- Historisierung und gesellschaftlicher Wandel in Deutschland im 19. Jahrhundert. (Wissenskultur und gesellschaftlicher Wandel. Vol. 5). Akademie, Berlin 2003, ISBN 3-05-003841-1.
