= Franz Anton Knittel =

German theologian, priest and palaeographer

Franz Anton Knittel (April 3, 1721 – December 10, 1792) was a German, Lutheran orthodox theologian, priest, and palaeographer. He examined palimpsests' text of the Codex Guelferbytanus 64 Weissenburgensis and deciphered text of Codex Carolinus. He was the author of many works.

== Life ==
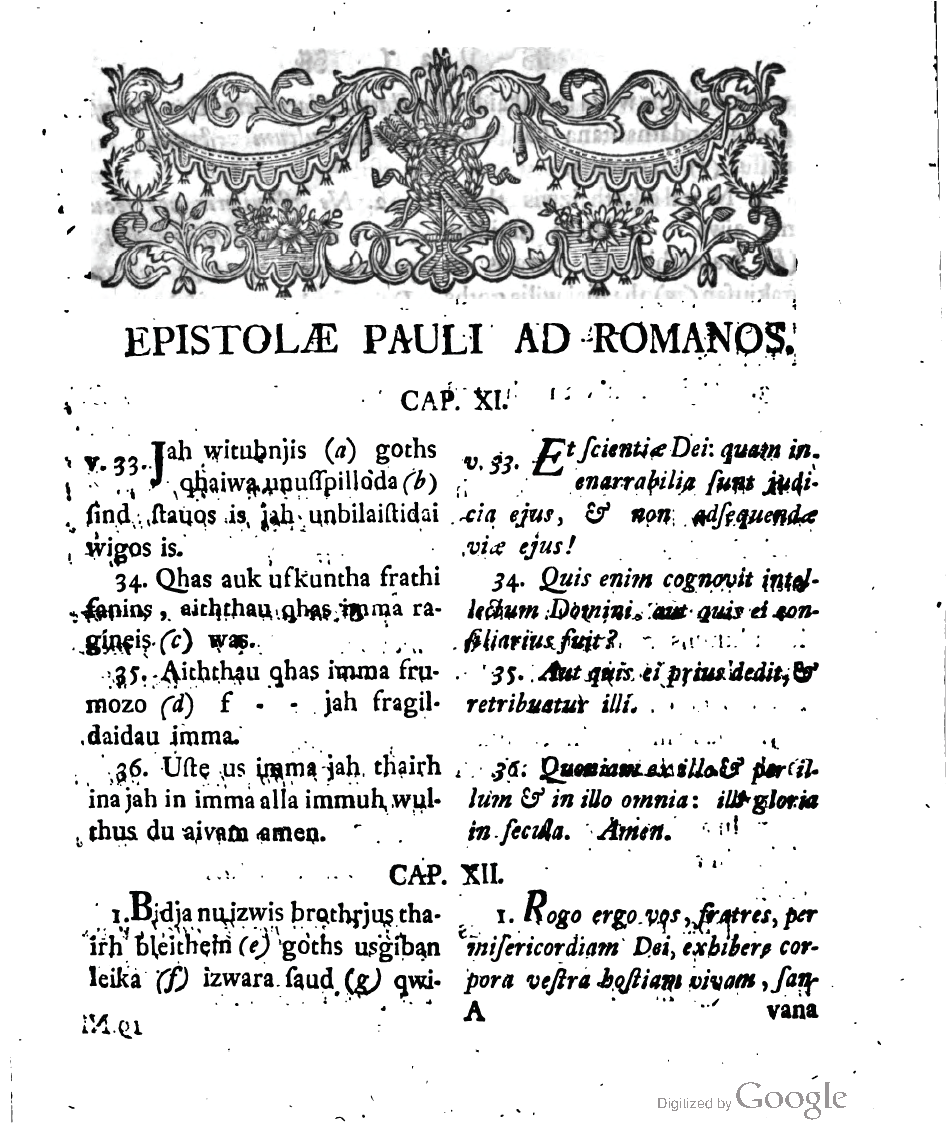
Romans 11:33-12:1 in Knittel's edition of Codex Carolinus

Knittel became a priest in 1751 and the archdeacon of the main church in Wolfenbüttel in 1753. In 1766, he became general superintendent and the first preacher in Wolfenbüttel and in 1776 general superintendent in Brunswick. After receiving work in the main church of Wolfenbüttel Knittel started to examine manuscripts housed in the Ducal Library of Wolfenbüttel. In 1756, he studied the Codex Guelferbytanus 64 Weissenburgensis. The manuscript and its palimpsest text had earlier been examined by Heusinger, who described it in 1752, but Knittel was the first who recognized that the palimpsest Greek text belonged to two different manuscripts of the New Testament. Knittel designated these two texts by sigla A and B. He recognized also lists of the κεφαλαια (chapters) as another, the third Greek manuscript. Knittel also deciphered and reconstructed the Gothic-Latin text of the palimpsest and published it in 1762 at Brunswick. It is known as Codex Carolinus. The upper text of palimpsest contains text of Isidore of Seville's Origines and his six letters. Knittel designated it by siglum E and dated it to the 11th century.

Knittel made many errors in deciphering the palimpsest's text, especially in the Latin text of Codex Carolinus (e.g. enarrabilia for scrutabilia). Tischendorf made a new and more accurate collation for the Latin text (edited in 1855). A new collation of the Gothic text was published by Carla Falluomini in 1999. Knittel examined also other manuscripts (e.g. Minuscule 126, 429).

Knittel defended a traditional point of view in theology and was against the modern textual criticism. He defended an authenticity of the Pericopa Adulterae (John 7:53-8:11), Comma Johanneum (1 John 5:7), and Testimonium Flavianum. According to him Erasmus in his Novum Instrumentum omne did not incorporate the Comma from Codex Montfortianus, because of grammar differences, but used Complutensian Polyglotta. According to him the Comma was known for Tertullian.

== Works ==
- Gedanken von einem Lehrgebaude einer gemessenen Geistlerlehre und ihrem Bussen in der Gottesgelahrtheit 1746
- Epistola, in qua de eo, quod in Georgicis Hesiodes, quae εργα και ημεραι inscribuntur, supposititium est, disseruit de salis vallibus et a viro celebrrimo in arte critica M. horum, quae accusantus, vindice atquae assertore, dissentit, Brunsvick 1754
- Neue Gedanken von den allgemeinen Christsehlern in den Handschriften des Neuen Testamtns u. s. w., mebst einem Versuche einer hermeneutischen Muthmassunge - Sitten - Lehre der ersten Kirche, Braunschweig 1755
- Praecopium Ulphilanum primum, Brunovici 1758; alterum 1760
- Ulphilae versionem Gothicam nonnullorum capitum epistolae Pauli ad Romanos e litura MS. rescript Bibliothecae Guelferbytanae, cum variis monumentis ineditis eruit, commentatus est, detitque foras, Brunovici 1762
- Friedenspredigt, Braunschweig 1763
- Prisca ruris ecclesia, Brunovici 1767
- Beyträge zur Kritik über Johannes Offenbarung, Schröder, Braunschweig und Hildensheim 1773.
- Neue Kritiken über das weltberühmte Zeugnis dea alten Juden Flav. Josephus von Jesu Christo Braunschweig 1779
- Neue Kritiken über den berühmten Sprych: Drey sind, die da zeugen im Himmel, der Vater, das Wort, und der heilige Geist, und diese drei sind eins Braunschweig 1785. [English] New Criticisms on the Celebrated Text, 1 John V. 7. "For there are three that bear record in heaven, the Father, the Word, and the Holy Ghost; and these three are one," William Alleyn Evanson, 1829.
- Ueber die Aufklärung des Lachmannes, Frankfurt und Leipzig 1787
