= Codex Carolinus =

6th- or 7th-century Biblical manuscript

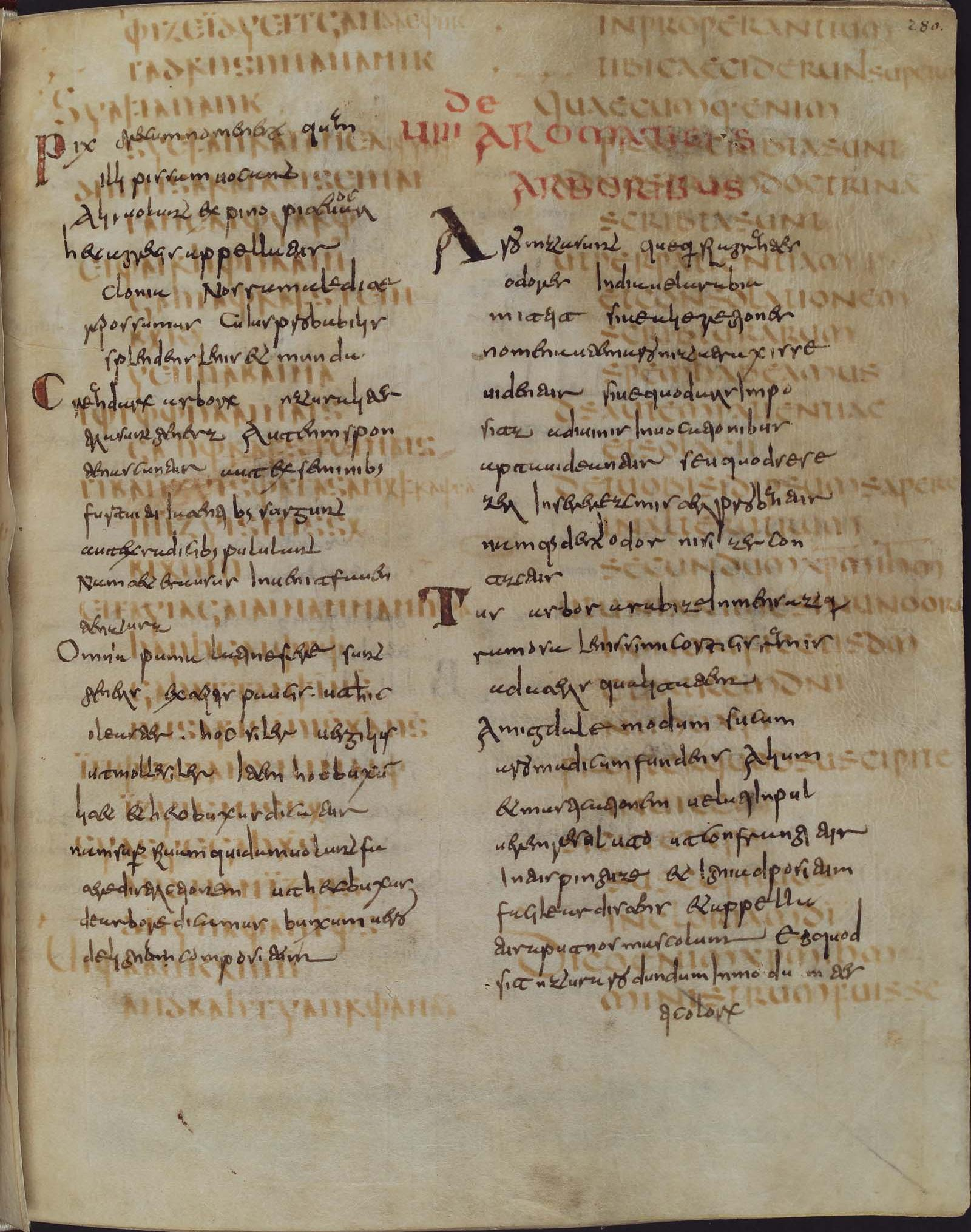
Codex Carolinus, showing the text of Romans 15:3-8

Codex Carolinus is an uncial manuscript of the New Testament on parchment, dated to the 6th-7th century. It is a palimpsest of a Latin text written over a Gothic one. The Gothic text is designated by siglum Car; the Latin text is designated by siglum gue (traditional system) or by 79 (on the list of Beuron) and represents the Old Latin translation of the New Testament. It is housed in the Herzog August Library in Wolfenbüttel in Lower Saxony, Germany.

Thought fragmentary, it is one of the very few extant manuscripts of Wulfila's Gothic Bible. The four leaves of the codex were used as raw material for the production of another manuscript – Codex Guelferbytanus 64 Weissenburgensis, and its text has been reconstructed several times. Franz Anton Knittel was the first to examine it and decipher its text.

== Description ==
The codex has survived to the present day in a very fragmentary condition. It contains only the text of the Epistle to the Romans 11-15 on four parchment leaves (size 26.5 cm by 21.5 cm). The text is written in two parallel columns, 27 lines per column. The left column is in Gothic, the right in Latin.

Contents
Romans 11:33-12:5; 12:17-13:5; 14:9-20; 15:3-13.

The text of the codex is not divided into chapters. The nomina sacra are used both in Gothic and Latin texts (i̅h̅m̅ and i̅h̅u̅ for "Iesum" and "Iesu"). All the abbreviations are marked with the superscript bar. Its text has some value in Romans 14:14 for Textual Criticism.

It is a palimpsest; the whole book is known as Codex Guelferbytanus 64 Weissenburgensis. The upper text is in Latin, it contains Isidore of Seville's Origines and his six letters. The lower text of the codex belongs to several much earlier manuscripts, such as Codex Guelferbytanus A, Codex Guelferbytanus B, and Codex Carolinus.

== History ==
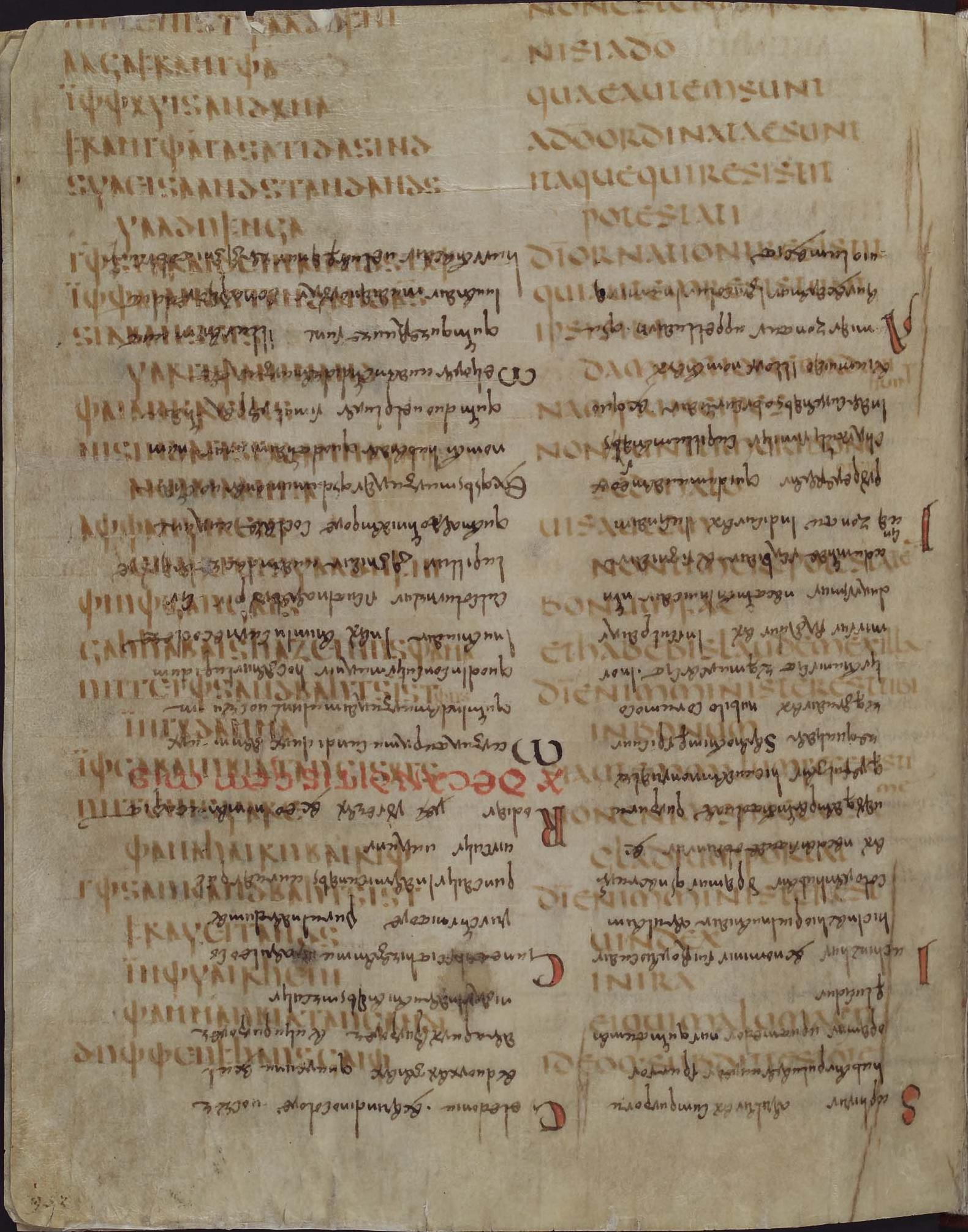
Folio 256 verso with text of Romans 12:17-13:1; the Latin text is inverted

The manuscript is dated palaeographically to the 6th century or 7th century. According to Tischendorf it was written in the 6th century. Probably it was written in Italy. Nothing is known about its early history. In the 12th or 13th century four of its leaves were used as material for another book and they were overwritten by Latin text. Its later story is linked with the codices Guelferbytanus A and B.

Formerly the manuscript was held in Bobbio, Weissenburg, Mainz, and Prague. The Duke of Brunswick bought it in 1689.

The manuscript became known to the scholars in the half of the 18th century, where it was found in the Ducal Library of Wolfenbüttel. The first description of the codex was made by Heusinger. Franz Anton Knittel (1721–1792) recognized two lower Greek texts of the New Testament in this palimpsest codex, and designated them by A and B, he recognized also the Gothic-Latin text (known later as Codex Carolinus). F. A. Knittel deciphered Gothic-Latin text of the Codex Carolinus and published it in 1762 at Brunswick. In his edition all abbreviated forms, Gothic and Latin, are written in full. It was published in Uppsala in 1763. It was published again by Theodor Zahn.

Knittel made many errors, especially in Latin text, he also did not decipher every word and left several lacunae in the reconstructed text (e.g. Romans 11:35; 12:2; 15:8). Tischendorf made a new and more accurate collation for the Latin text and edited in 1855. Tischendorf used abbreviations for the nomina sacra, he did not leave any lacunae. The new collation of the Gothic text was given by Carla Falluomini in 1999.

The codex is located at the Herzog August Bibliothek (no. 4148) in Wolfenbüttel.

== Samples of reconstructed text (Romans 11:33-12:2) ==
=== Gothic text (folio 277 recto, 1 col.) ===
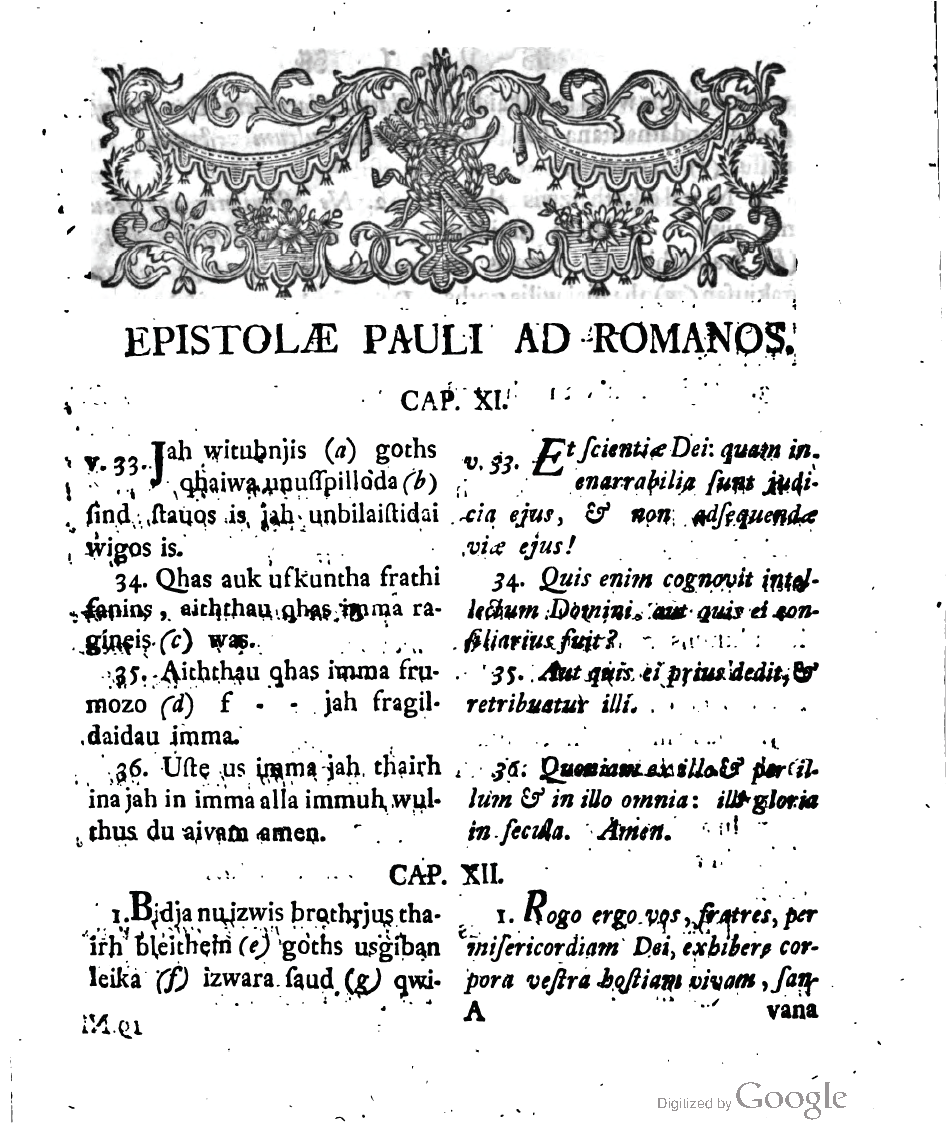
Romans 11:33-12:1 in Knittel's edition

Knittel's reconstruction Jah witubnijs goths qhaiwa unusspilloda sind stauos is jah unbilaistidai wigos is Qhas auk ufkuntha frathi fanins aiththau qhas imma raginens was Aiththau qhas imma frumozo f . . jah fragildaidau imma Uste us imma jah thairh ina jah in imma alla immuh wulthus du aivam amen Bidja nuizwis brothrjus thairh bleithein goths usgiban leika izwara saud qwiwana weihana waila galeikaidana gotha andathahtana blotinassu izwarana ni galeikoth izwis thamma aiwa	Falluomini's reconstruction Jah witubnijs g(u)þ(i)s hvaiwa unusspilloda si(n)d stauos ïs jah unbilaistidai wigos ïs Hvas auk ufkunþa [.]raþi f(rauj)ins aiþþau hvas ïmma raginens was Aiþ[.]au hvas ïmma fr[../.]a gaf jah fragildaidau ïmma uste us ïmma jah thairh ina jah ïn ïmma alla ïmmuh wulþus du aiwam amen Bi[.]ja nu ïzwis broþrjus þairh bleiþein g(u)þ(i)s usgiban leika ïzwara saud qiwana weihana waila galeikaidana g(u)þa andaþahtana blotinassu ïzwara(n)a ni galeikoþ ïzwis þamma aiwa

=== Latin text (folio 277 recto, 2 col.) ===
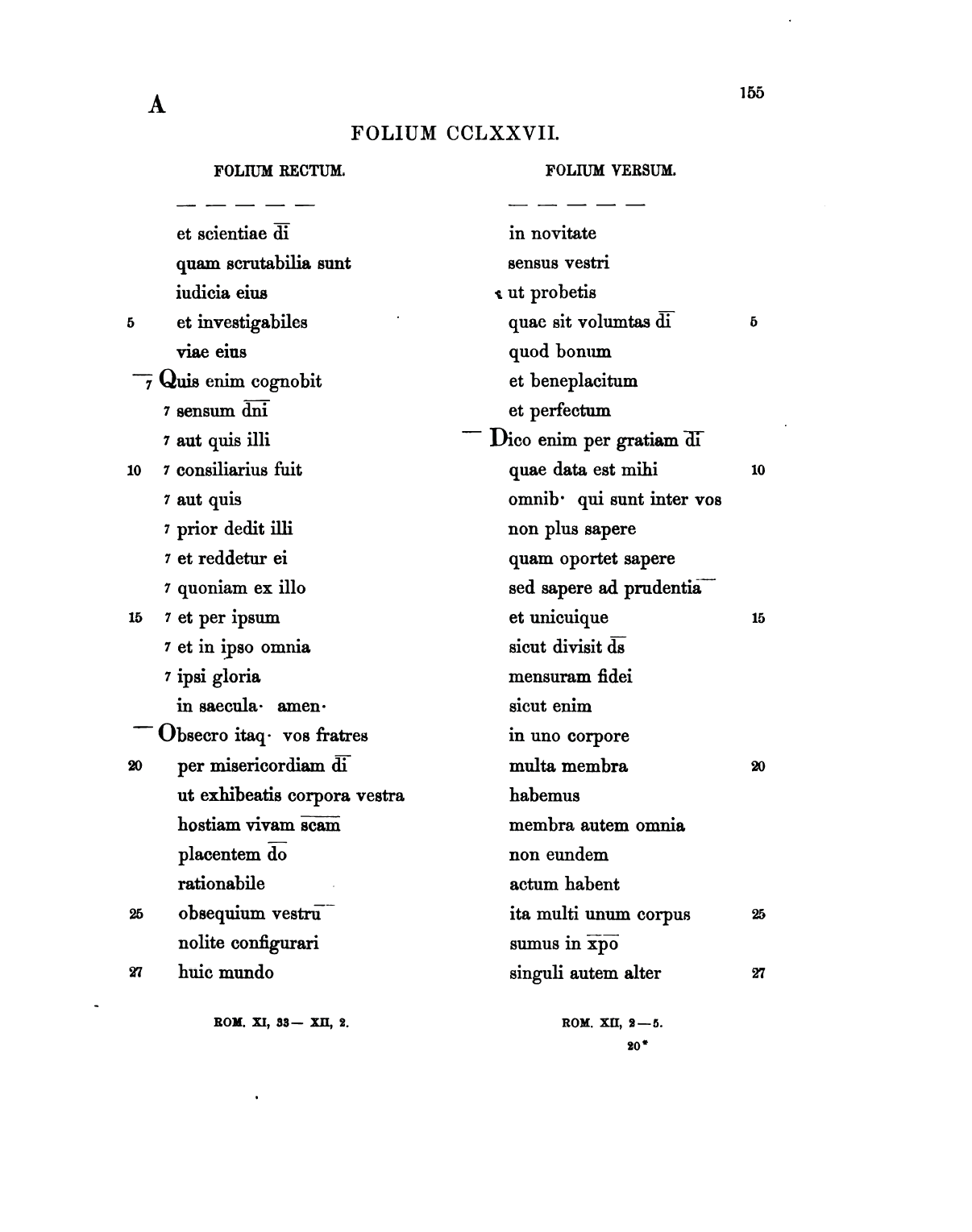
Tischendorf's edition of the text Romans 11:33-12:5

Knittel's reconstruction et scientiae Dei quam in enarrabilia sunt iudicia eius et non adsequaende viae eius Quis enim cognovit intellectum Domini aut quis ei consiliarus fuit aut quis ei prius dedit et retribuatur illi quoniam ex illo et per illum in illo omnia illi gloria in secula amen Rogo ergo vos fratres per misericordiam Dei exbibere corpora vestra hostiam vivam sanctam placentem Deo consideratum cultum vestrum ne assimiletis vos seculo	Tischendorf's reconstruction et scientiae d̅i̅ quam scrutabilia sunt iudicia eius et investigabiles viae eius Quis enim cognobit sensum d̅n̅i̅ aut quis illi consiliarus fuit aut quis prior dedit illi et reddetur ei quoniam ex illo et per ipsum et in ipso omnia ipsi gloria in secula amen Obsecro itaq vos fratres per misericordiam d̅i̅ ut exhibeatis corpora vestra hostiam vivam s̅c̅a̅m̅ placentem d̅o̅ rationabile obsequium vestru̅ nolite configuari huic mundo

== See also ==
Another manuscript of Gothic Bible

- Codices Ambrosiani
- Codex Argenteus
- Skeireins

Sortable articles

- Gothic Bible
- List of New Testament Latin manuscripts
- Biblical manuscript
- Textual criticism
