= Herzog August Library =

Library in Wolfenbüttel, Germany

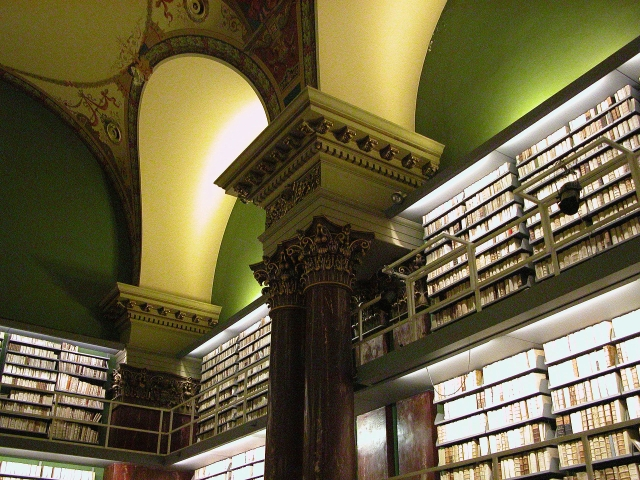
- Detail
- 52°09′50″N 10°31′52″E
- Location: Wolfenbüttel, Germany
- Established: 1572
- Architect: Hermann Korb

Collection
- Items collected: books, journals, newspapers, magazines, multimedia and manuscripts

Other information
- Director: Peter Burschel
- Website: www.hab.de

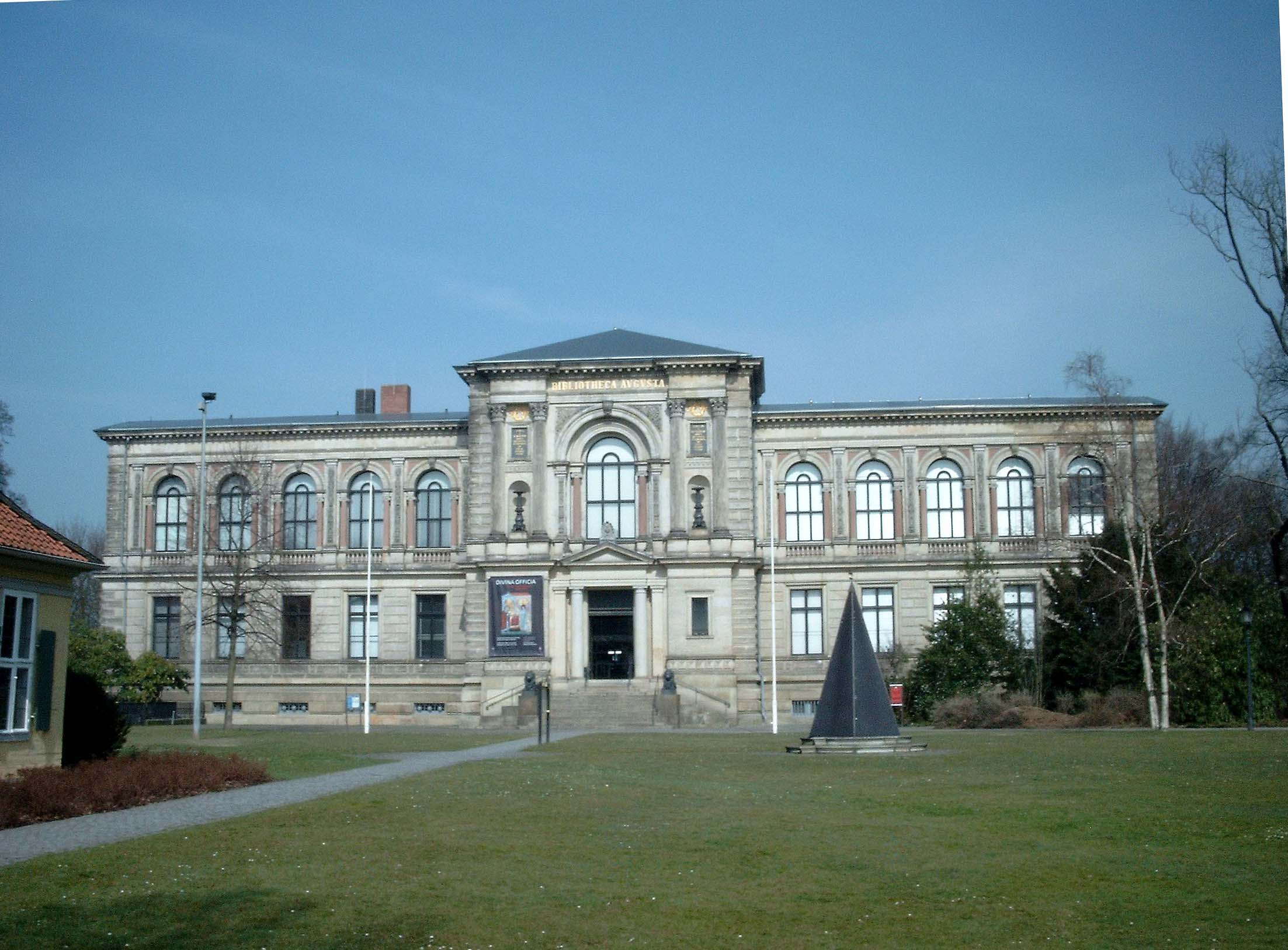
Main building of the Herzog August Bibliothek

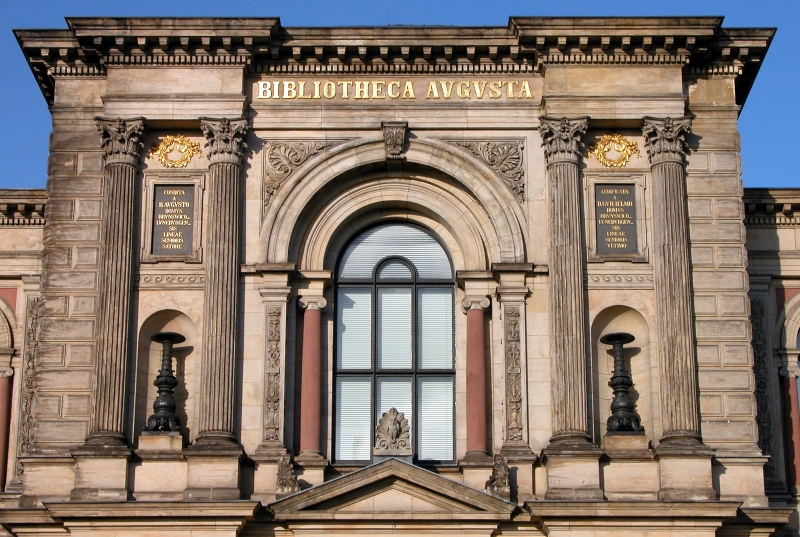
Entrance to the Library

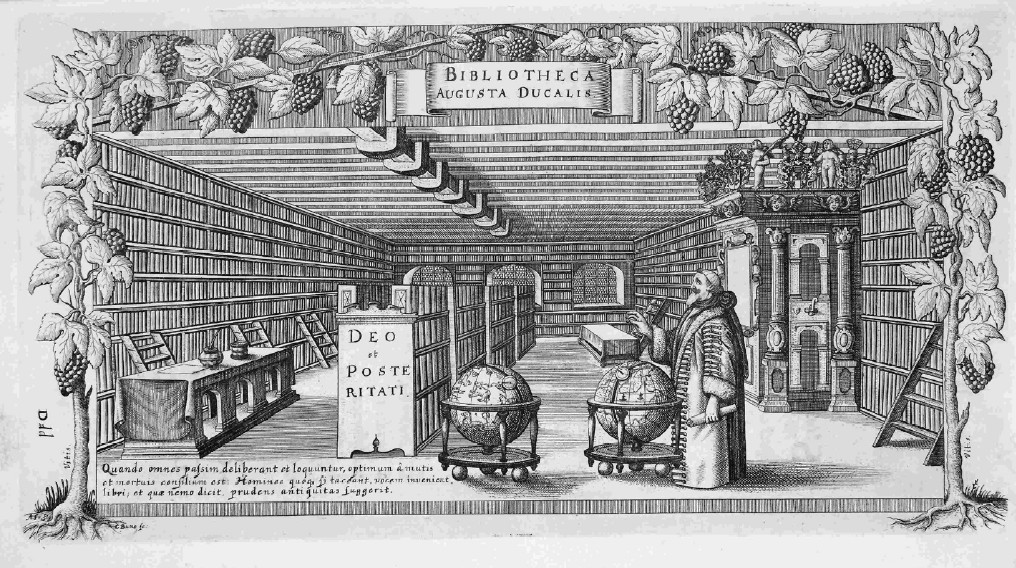
Duke Augustus in his library (1650) by Conrad Buno

The Herzog August Library (German: Herzog August Bibliothek — "HAB"), in Wolfenbüttel, Lower Saxony, known also as Bibliotheca Augusta, is a library of international importance for its collection from the Middle Ages and early modern Europe. The library is overseen by the Lower Saxony Ministry for Science and Culture.

== History ==
=== Before Augustus II: The Bibliotheca Julia ===
The ducal library was founded in the residenz town of Wolfenbüttel by Duke Julius of Brunswick-Lüneburg (1528–1589), who began collecting books around 1550 while studying in France. After buying some chivalric romances and scholarly literature he started acquiring from 1558 theological writings, and in 1567 his first large closed collection: the library of the Nuremberg City Counsel Michael von Kaden (d. between 15 December 1540/9 March 1541), containing mainly legal and humanistic writings. In the period 1570–1572, the libraries of the monasteries of Dorstadt, Wöltingerode, Heiningen and Steterburg were, in the course of the introduction of the Reformation in the duchy, transferred to Wolfenbüttel.

On 5 April 1572, Julius issued the first Liberey (i.e. library) Ordinance, which is considered the official founding document of the Wolfenbüttel library. As early as 1571, the Duke had entrusted the church musician Leonhart Schröter with library administration duties. Schröter is therefore considered the first Wolfenbüttel librarian. The collection of the Bibliotheca Julia received new growth in 1578 through the purchase of a larger collection of manuscripts from the estate of the theologian Johannes Aurifaber, who died three years earlier, and from the inheritance of Duchess Sophia Jagiellon and of the illegitimate son of Erich II of Brunswick-Calenberg-Göttingen.

After Julius' death in 1589, his son Duke Heinrich Julius inherited the library along with the crown. He expanded it to include the estate of the theologian Matthias Flacius and the collections of the monasteries Georgenberg bei Goslar near Goslar, Brunshausen and Hamersleben.

However, in 1618, just a few years after his accession, the succeeding Duke Friedrich Ulrich handed over the entire collection, which now comprised around 5,000 manuscripts and prints, to the Helmstedt University Library. In 1810, after the university closed, large parts of the holdings were returned to Wolfenbüttel.

=== The Bibliotheca Augusta ===
In the 17th century it was the largest library north of the Alps. The library was named after Duke Augustus (1579–1666), who greatly enlarged the collection, which was kept at Wolfenbüttel. Armies passed by, back and forth, over the centuries, but the collection was well protected. It was so highly regarded that generals placed the library under special protection, and the library is one of the oldest in the world to have never suffered loss to its collection.

In 2006 the library housed around 11,500 manuscripts and 900,000 books, of which 350,000 were printed between the 15th to 18th centuries. Of these, 3,500 are incunabula, 75,000 are from the sixteenth century, 150,000 are from the seventeenth century, and 120,000 are from the eighteenth century.

Notable librarians have included:

- 1604–1666: Augustus the Younger, Duke of Brunswick-Lüneburg
- 1691–1716: Gottfried Wilhelm Leibniz
- 1770–1781: Gotthold Ephraim Lessing
- 1968–1992: Paul Raabe
- 2016–: Peter Burschel

The library is famed for its research and for the hundreds of international scholars who collaborate with the library staff on various projects. Its research programs are described as exploring the "history of international relations, or the history of culture, ideas, and politics ... social history, the history of religion, business, science and law, constitutional history, the history of society, [and] women and gender from the Middle Ages to Early Modern Times".

== Significant manuscripts ==
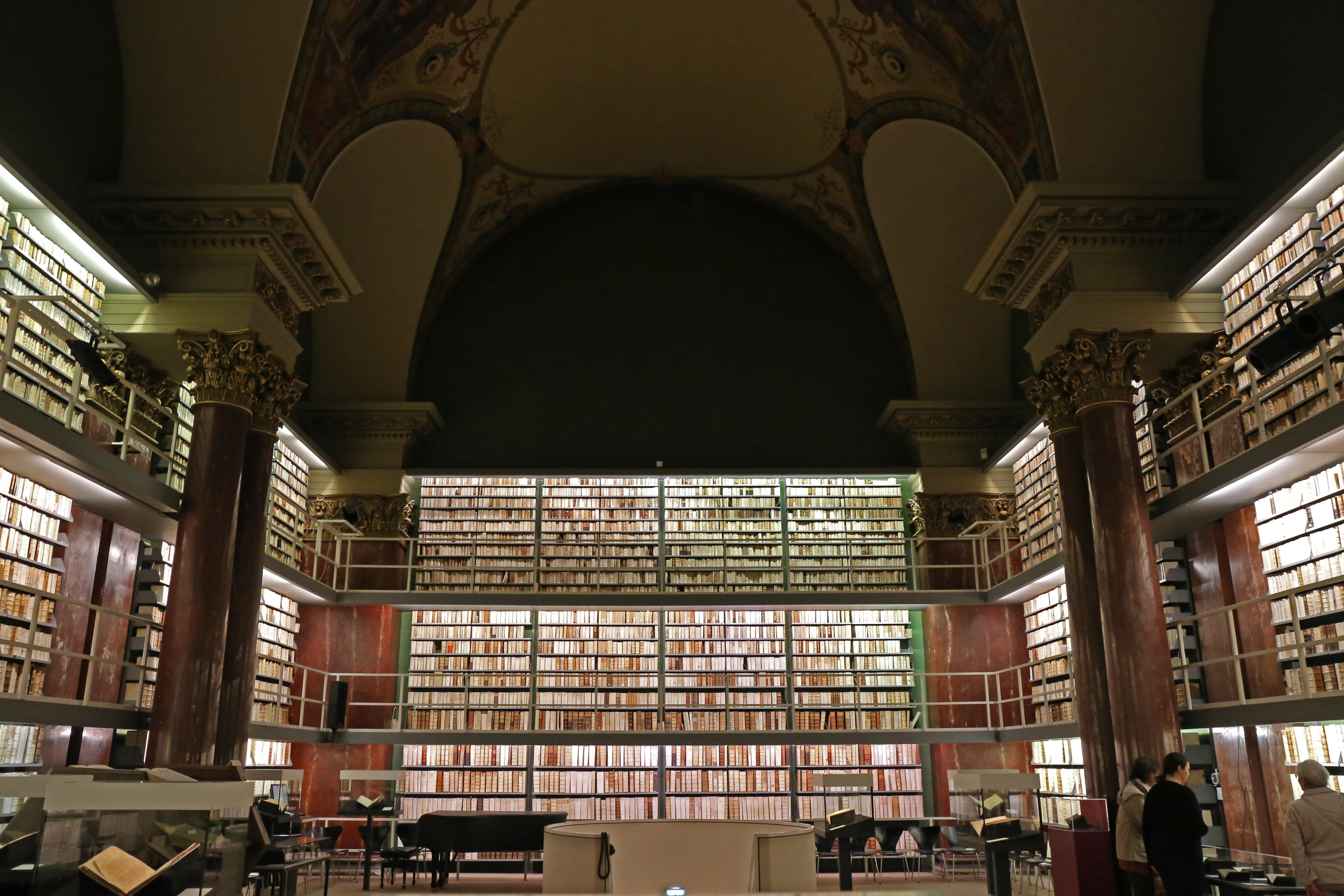
Augusteerhalle

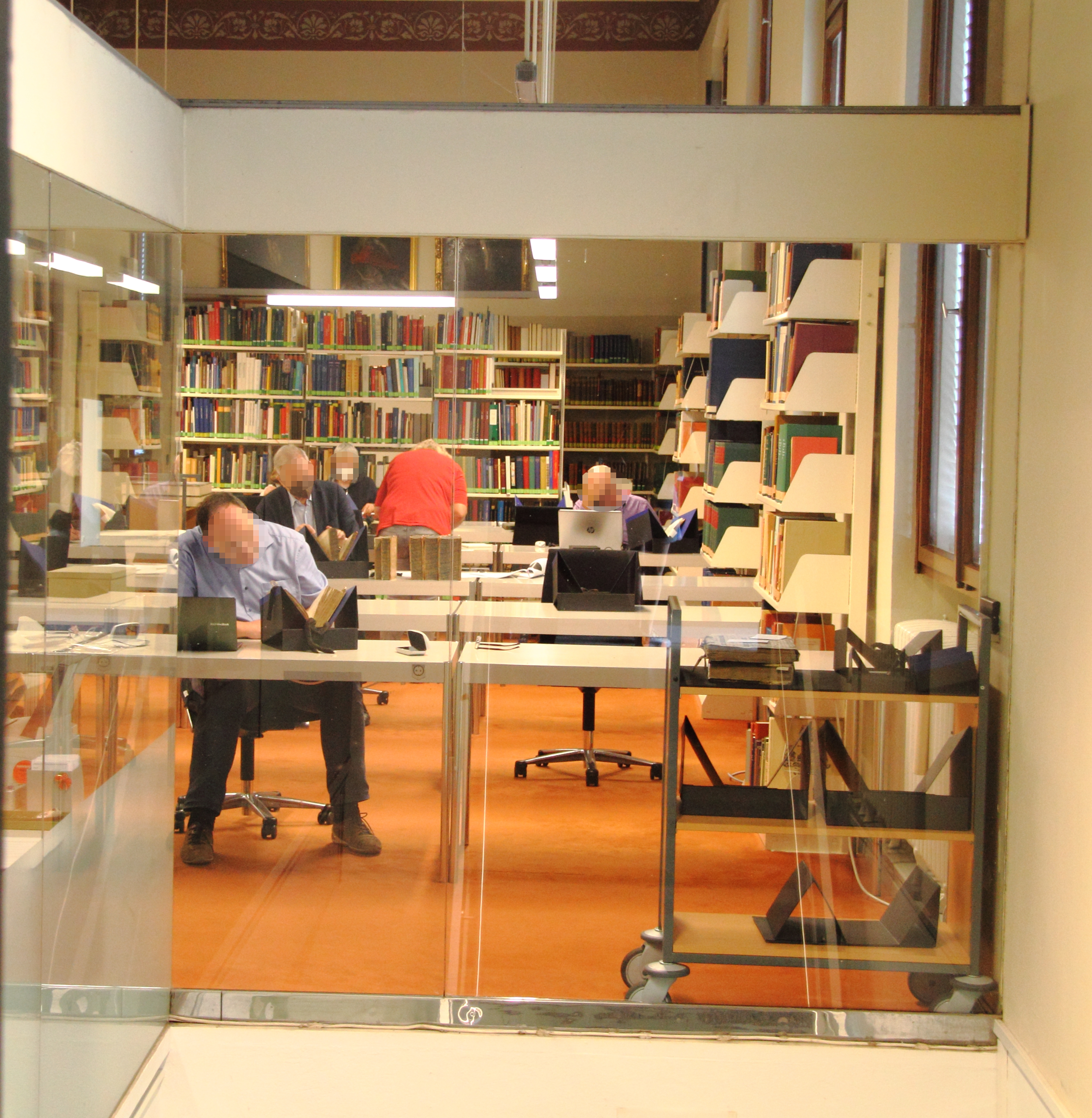
Reading room in 2022

- The famous palimpsest Codex Guelferbytanus 64 Weissenburgensis, which contains in the lower text Codex Guelferbytanus A, Codex Guelferbytanus B, and Codex Carolinus.
- Gospels of Henry the Lion
- Liber Floridus ca. 1150
- Minuscule 97
- Minuscule 126
- Minuscule 429
- Nine volumes from the library of Matthias Corvinus
- Schönrainer Liederhandschrift
- Visio Godeschalci
- Corpus Agrimensorum Romanorum
- Magnus liber organi, manuscripts W1 and W2
- Luther's Wolfenbüttel Psalter the only extant copy of Luther's glosses of his lectures on the Psalms beginning 1513.
