= Jakob Friedrich Heusinger =

German classical philologist

Jakob Friedrich Heusinger (11 April 1719 in Useborn in der Wetterau – 27 September 1778 in Wolfenbüttel) was a German classical philologist.

He studied philology and theology at the University of Jena, receiving his magister degree in 1748. Afterwards, he served as conrector (from 1750) and rector (from 1759) at the gymnasium in Wolfenbüttel. As a classical scholar he edited works by Cicero, Cornelius Nepos, Plutarch, et al.

== Selected works ==
- "Codicis M.S. qui Aiacem et Electram Sophoclis continet, brevem descriptionem, et in easdem tragoedias observationum specimen", 1745; respondent Friedrich Liebe.
- "De Quatuor Evangeliorum Codice Graeco quem antiqua manu in membrana scriptum Guelferbytana bibliotheca servat", 1752 (Referring to the Codex Guelferbytanus containing the four canonical Gospels).
- "Programma de Nepote Cornelio bene merendi aliquot subsidia Bibliothecae Guelpherbytanae indicans", 1759.
- "Fragmenta Cornelii Nepotis Guelpherbytana a censoria Lipsiensis critici virgula vindicate", 1760.
- "Fl. Mallii Theodori De metris liber", 1766 (edition of Flavius Mallius Theodorus' treatise on metres).
- "M. Tullii Ciceronis De officiis libri tres", 1783; with Johann Michael Heusinger, Konrad Heusinger (edition of Cicero's "De Officiis", book III.
