= Codex Guelferbytanus A =

Uncial 024
- New Testament manuscript
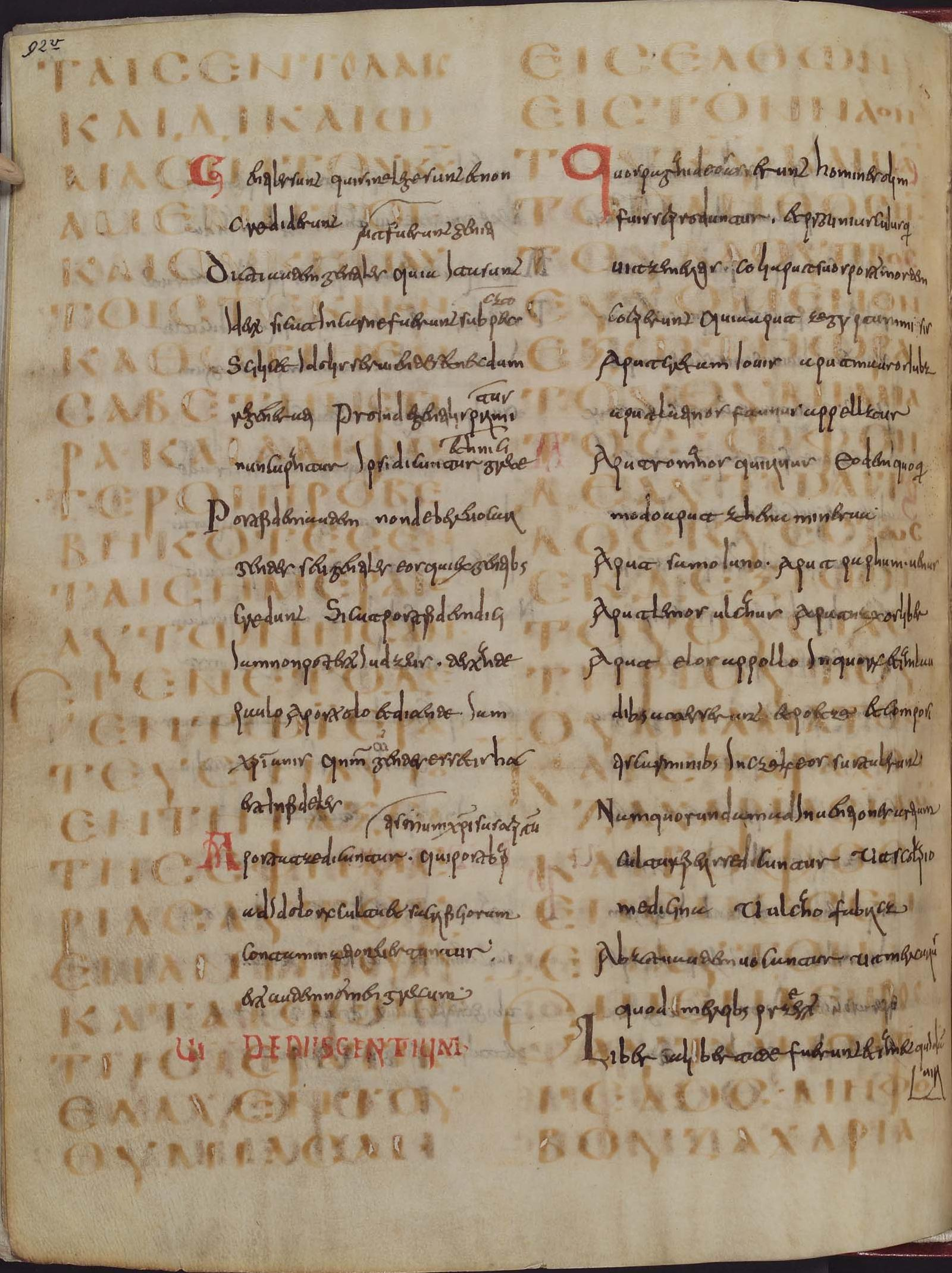
- Luke 1:6-13
- Name: Guelferbytanus A
- Sign: P^{e}
- Text: Gospels
- Date: 6th century
- Script: Greek
- Found: F. A. Knittel, 18th century
- Now at: Wolfenbüttel
- Size: 26.5 cm by 21.5 cm
- Type: Byzantine text-type
- Category: V
- Note: palimpsest

Codex Guelferbytanus A designated by P^{e} or 024 (in the Gregory-Aland numbering), ε 33 (von Soden), is a Greek uncial manuscript of the Gospels, dated palaeographically to the 6th century. The manuscript is very lacunose.

== Description ==
The codex contains the text of the four Gospels in a very fragmentary condition on 44 leaves (26.5 cm by 21.5 cm). Written in two columns per page, 24 lines per column. It does not contain in genere breathings and accents. Sometimes it uses breathings, but often wrongly. It has errors of iotacism in the Alexandrian way.

Contents
Matthew 1:11-21; 3:13-4:19; 10:7-19; 10:42-11:11; 13:40-50; 14:15-15:3.29-39;
Mark 1:2-11; 3:5-17; 14:13-24.48-61; 15:12-37;
Luke 1:1-13; 2:9-20; 6:21-42; 7:32-8:2; 8:31-50; 9:26-36; 10:36-11:4; 12:34-45; 14:14-25; 15:13-16:22; 18:13-39; 20:21-21:3; 22:3-16; 23:20-33; 23:45-24:1; 24:14-37;
John 1:29-40; 2:13-25; 21:1-11.

The notation of the Ammonian Sections is given in the margin of text, but without reference to the Eusebian Canons. The nomina sacra attested in this uncial fragment are Ι̅Σ̅ (Iesous, Jesus) Χ̅Σ̅ (Christos, Christ), Κ̅Σ̅ (Kurios, Lord) Θ̅Σ̅, Υ̅Σ̅, Π̅Η̅Ρ̅, Π̅Ν̅Α̅, Ι̅Λ̅Η̅Μ̅, Α̅Ν̅Ο̅Σ̅, and Δ̅Α̅Δ̅. The number "forty" is also written with an abbreviation — Μ̅. All the abbreviations are marked with the superscript bar.

It is a palimpsest. The whole book is known as Codex Guelferbytanus 64 Weissenburgensis. The upper text is in Latin and contains Isidore of Seville's Origines.

== Text ==
The Greek text of this codex is a representative of the Byzantine text-type. Aland placed it in Category V. According to the Claremont Profile Method in Luke 20 it has mixed text.

According to Scrivener the codex agrees with AB united 50 times, sides with B against A 29 times, and accords with A against B in 102 places.

== History ==
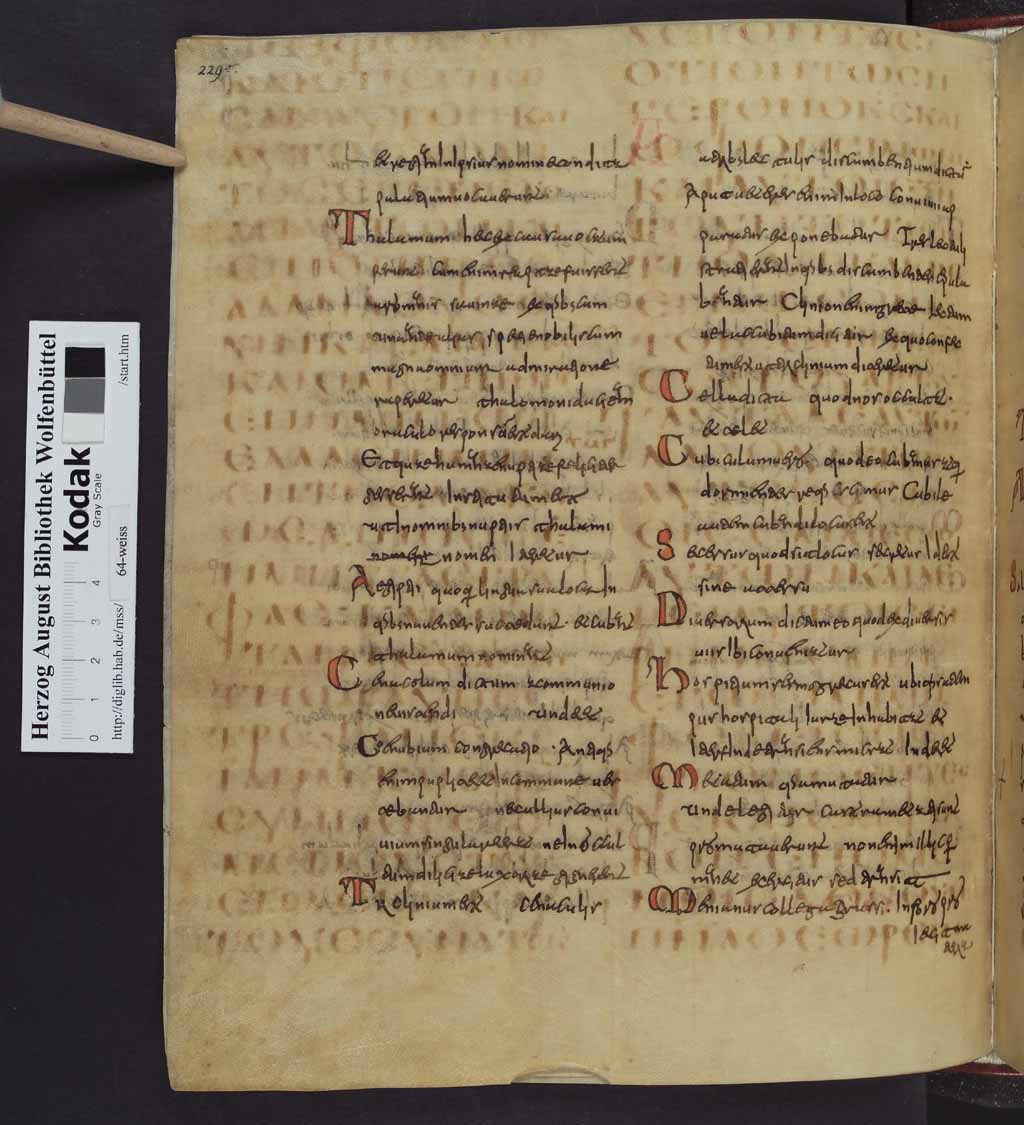

Formerly the manuscript was held in Bobbio, Weissenburg, Mainz, and Prague. The Duke of Brunswick bought it in 1689.

The manuscript became known to scholars in the latter half of the 18th century. Franz Anton Knittel (1721–1792) discovered it in the Ducal Library of Wolfenbüttel. Knittel recognized two palimpsest Greek texts of the New Testament in the codex and designated them by A and B. F. A. He published the Gothic text of the codex (Codex Carolinus) at Brunswick in 1762. The lower Greek text was collated and edited by Tischendorf in 1860.

The codex is located at the Herzog August Bibliothek (Weissenburg 64) in Wolfenbüttel.

== See also ==
- List of New Testament uncials
- Textual criticism
