= Queen of Psalm 45 =

Figure described in Psalm 45 of the book of Psalms

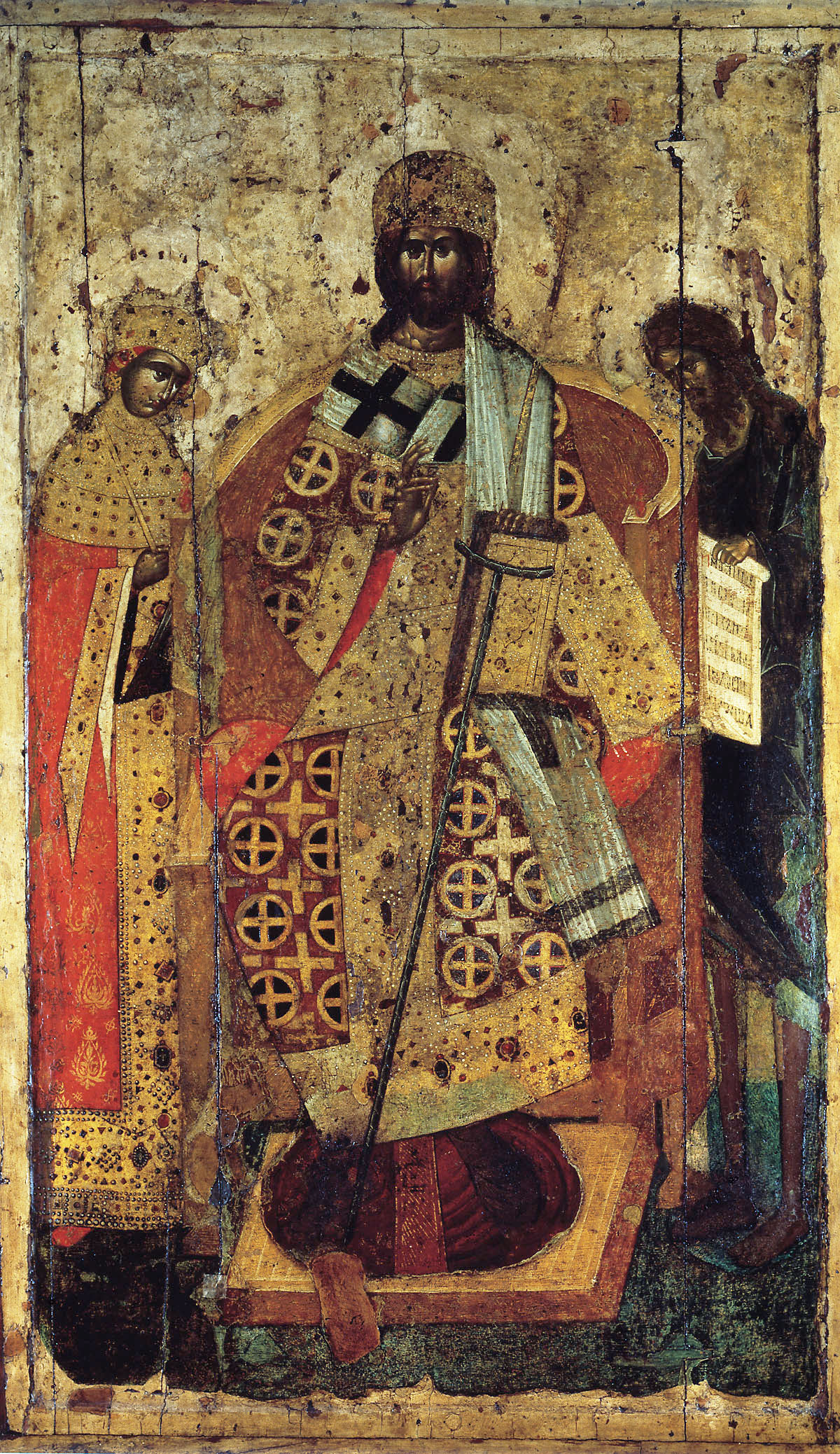
The Russian icon "The Queen stands at your right hand", Dormition Cathedral, Moscow

The Queen in Gold of Ophir or Queen of Psalm 45 is a biblical character, who appears in Psalm 45 of the book of Psalms. She is considered by Saint Maximus and other theologians as a prophetic figure of the Virgin Mary. In Saint Augustine of Hippo's interpretation of his work The City of God, he interprets the Church as Queen but also relates the Queen to the Virgin Mary. Both Catholics and Orthodox give a Mariological meaning to the Queen of Psalm 45. In a papal audience, Pope John Paul II accepts the interpretations of the Virgin Mary and the Church. Among Protestants, including those of more reformed theology and evangelicals, they accept the Queen's interpretation as the Church, rejecting the Queen's Marian interpretation. Other Protestants have come to interpret the Queen as Israel. There is an illustration of a Russian icon called The Queen stands at your right hand Hand based on the illustration of Psalm 45 (44).

== Narrative ==
Psalm 45 describes To "the throne of God" (45:6). And at his side "the queen in gold of Ophir" (45:9). The Lord says "Hearken, O daughter, and consider, and incline thine ear; forget also thine own people, and thy father's house" (45:10). It is also mentioned that all generations will remember and praise her "I will make thy name to be remembered in all generations: therefore shall the people praise thee for ever and ever" (45:17).

== Interpretation as the Virgin Mary ==
Some theologians such as Saint Maximus the Confessor, Saint Athanasius of Alexandria, Saint Thomas Aquinas, Saint Amadeus of Lausanne, Saint Bonaventure and Saint John Chrysostom have considered the Queen as a prefiguration of the Royalty of the Virgin Mary.

In the homily of the Dormition of the Theotokos, St. Gregory Palamas quotes Psalm 45, referring to the Queen with the Virgin Mary.

=== In the Protoevangelium of James ===
The Protoevangelium of James relates that when Mary, at the age of three, was sent to the temple by her parents, a procession of virgin maidens, holding candles two by two, accompanied her to her destination. There, the priest received her and, after kissing her, blessed her and exclaimed: "The Lord has magnified your name before all generations, because at the end of time he will manifest his redemption in you to his children of Israel." Thus the prophecy of Psalm 45 was fulfilled, according to which the bride would be presented to the king by a retinue of other virgins. The first verses speak of the most beautiful of all the sons of men, full of eternal graces and blessings, the hero defender of truth and justice, Jesus Christ, the Messiah and son of God. Verse 10 refers to this virgin queen as being at the right hand of the king, which has a symbolism of great honor. Verses 14 and 15, as interpreted by St. Maximus, relate how the daughter of this king, who had previously revealed herself to be God himself (v. 7), presented herself to him beautifully, in garments embroidered with gold and garments of many colors. (v.12) It is stated that the beauty of the Virgin enchants the King, her Father, which shows us that the beauty and luxury of her clothes represent the different colors of her various virtues, and the precious value, like gold, of all its qualities, with which it adorned itself throughout its growth.

=== Prophecy ===
In homily 7, Saint Amadeus of Lausanne interprets the expression "enter the princess, all beautiful" as a symbolic confirmation of Mary's Assumption into heaven.

"She is a bride, so gentle and affectionate, and the mother of the only true bridegroom. In her abundant goodness she has channeled the spring of reason's garden, the well of living and life-giving waters that pour forth in a rushing stream from divine Lebanon and flow down from Mount Zion until they surround the shores of every far-flung nation. With divine assistance she has redirected these waters and made them into streams of peace and pools of grace. Therefore, when the Virgin of virgins was led forth by God and her Son, the King of kings. amid the company of exulting angels and rejoicing archangels, with the heavens ringing with praise, the prophecy of the psalmist was fulfilled, in which he said to the Lord: At your right hand stands the queen, clothed in gold of Ophir."

— Saint Amadeus of Lausanne, Homily 7,

== Russian icon of Jesus Christ ==
There is a Russian icon based on the illustration of Psalm 45 showing Christ as King next to the Virgin Mary as Queen and on the other side is St. John the Baptist.
