= Psalm 45 =

- "My heart is inditing a good matter"
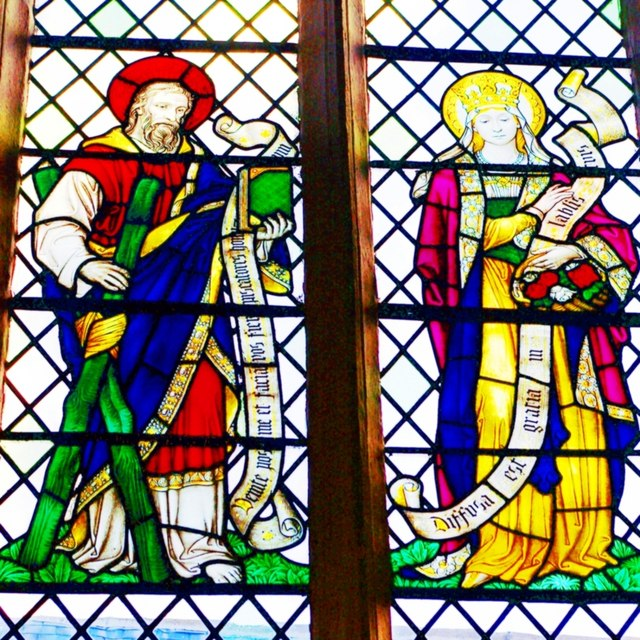
- English Window quoting the verse "Full of grace are thy lips"
- Other name: Psalm 44; "Eructavit cor meum"
- Language: Hebrew (original)

Psalm 45
- ← Psalm 44 Psalm 46 →
- Book: Book of Psalms
- Hebrew Bible part: Ketuvim
- Order in the Hebrew part: 1
- Category: Sifrei Emet
- Christian Bible part: Old Testament
- Order in the Christian part: 19

Psalm 45 is the 45th psalm of the Book of Psalms, beginning in English in the King James Version: "My heart is inditing a good matter". In the slightly different numbering system used in the Greek Septuagint and Latin Vulgate translations of the Bible, this psalm is Psalm 44. In Latin, it is known as "Eructavit cor meum". It was composed by the sons of Korach on (or "according to") the Shoshannim–either a musical instrument or the tune to which the psalm should be sung. The psalm has been interpreted as an epithalamium, or wedding song, written to a king on the day of his marriage to a foreign woman, and is one of the royal psalms.

The psalm forms a regular part of Jewish, Catholic, Lutheran, Anglican and other Protestant liturgies.

== Background ==
According to classical Jewish sources, Psalm 45 refers to the Jewish Messiah. According to Metzudot, a classical Jewish commentary, the king mentioned in verse 2 is the Jewish Messiah.

Christian scholars frequently interpret the psalm as a Messianic prophecy. Henry explains the prophecy as referring to Jesus as both the future king and a bridegroom of the church. In Hebrews 1:8–9, verses 6–7 of this psalm are quoted as allusions to Jesus.

== Themes ==
Shoshannim (lilies) can refer to either a musical instrument shaped like a lily (shoshana in Hebrew), or the tune to which the psalm should be sung. Rashi proposes that the term refers to Torah scholars, and interprets the rest of the psalm according to the scholars' efforts in and reward for Torah study.

Jesuit writer Mitchell Dahood asserts that the psalm is an epithalamium, or a wedding song, written to a king on the day of his marriage to a foreign woman, and is one of the royal psalms. Die Bibel mit Erklärungen states that Psalm 45 is the only example of profane poetry in the Psalms and was composed and sung by a minstrel or cult prophets on the occasion of the marriage of the king. In the 19th century, Franz Delitzsch argued that the poem was written on the occasion of Jehoram of Judah's marriage to Athaliah; John Calvin and Alexander Kirkpatrick both maintained that it referred rather to the marriage of Solomon with an Egyptian princess. More recently, Near Eastern scholar Charles R. Krahmalkov posits that the wedding of Jezebel and Ahab was the likely occasion, reading verse 14 as originally referring not to a "King's daughter who is within" but a "daughter of the King of the Phoenicians (Pōnnīma)".

Charles Spurgeon, however, rejects purely historical interpretations, stating: "Maschil, an instructive ode, not an idle lay, or a romancing ballad, but a Psalm of holy teaching, didactic and doctrinal. This proves that it is to be spiritually understood. … This is no wedding song of earthly nuptials, but an Epithalamium for the Heavenly Bridegroom and his elect spouse." Calvin also explicitly links the Psalm to the spiritual marriage between Christ and the Church.

Verse 14 in the Hebrew, "All the glory of the king's daughter is within", encapsulates the import of tzniut (modesty) in Judaism. The Midrash Tanhuma teaches on this verse, "If a woman remains modestly at home, she is worthy that both her husband and children are Kohanim Gedolim [who wear golden clothes]."

Although this is the only Psalm in which women are given a sustained presence, it has received criticism for its fairy-tale depiction of the bride's expected subservience to a handsome and powerful king.

== Uses ==
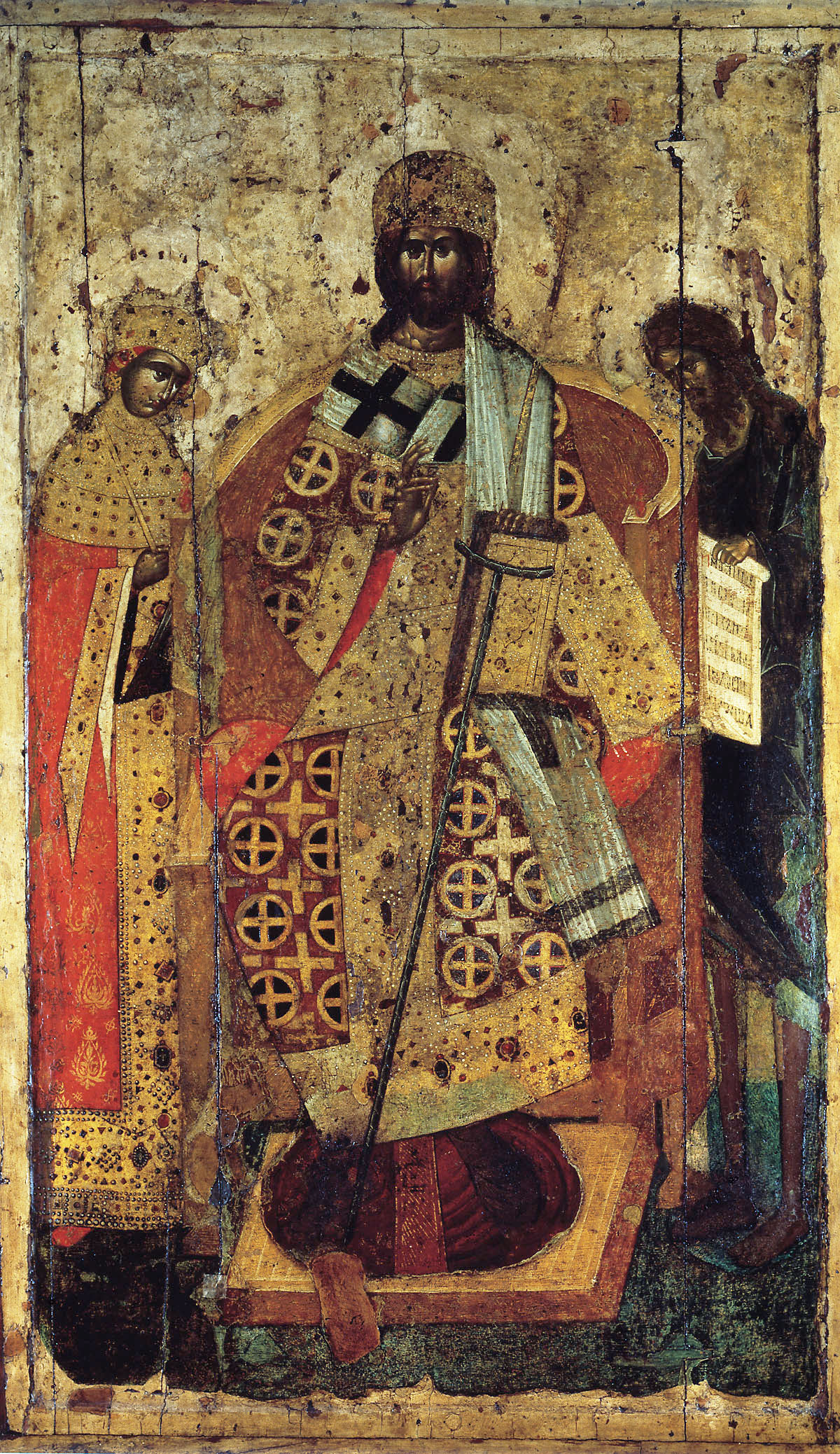
The Russian icon "The Queen stands at your right hand", Dormition Cathedral, Moscow, illustrating the Christian interpretation of Psalm 45, making Jesus a king and his mother Mary a queen

=== New Testament ===
Verses 6 and 7 are quoted in the Epistle to the Hebrews 1:8–9.

=== Judaism ===
In the Siddur Avodas Yisrael, Psalm 45 is recited as a Song of the Day on Shabbat Chayei Sarah and Shabbat Pekudei.

This psalm is said as a general prayer for the end of the exile and the coming of the Mashiach.

=== Catholic Church ===
Since the early Middle Ages, monasteries have traditionally performed this psalm during the celebration of Monday matins, according to the Rule of St. Benedict (530). In modern times in the Liturgy of the Hours, Psalm 45 is sung or recited, in two parts, at Vespers on Monday of the second week of the four-weekly cycle, and at the midday office on Saturday of the fourth week. The portion of the Psalm which refers to the 'Queen, in gold of Ophir' is also one of the set readings for mass on the Feast of the Assumption of the Blessed Virgin Mary.

=== Coptic Orthodox Church ===
In the Agpeya, the Coptic Church's book of hours, this psalm is prayed in the office of Terce.

=== Book of Common Prayer ===
In the Church of England's Book of Common Prayer, this psalm is appointed to be read on the morning of the ninth day of the month, as well as at Mattins on Christmas Day.

== Musical settings ==
Heinrich Schütz wrote a setting of a paraphrase of Psalm 45 in German, "Mein Herz dichtet ein Lied mit Fleiß", SWV 142, for the Becker Psalter, published first in 1628.

== Interpretations ==
There have been a number of suggestions as to the location of Ophir. One such is the west coast of Hispaniola found by Christopher Columbus, "from whence at this time is brought most fine gold".

The "Queen of gold of Ophir" has been variously interpreted to mean a mother of the king of Israel, Israel itself, the Christian Church, or the Virgin Mary.

== Text ==
The following table shows the Hebrew text of the Psalm with vowels and cantillation marks, alongside the Clementine Vulgate and the Koine Greek text in the Septuagint and the English translation from the King James Version. Note that the meaning can slightly differ between these versions, as the Septuagint and the Masoretic Text come from different textual traditions. (Note: A 1917 translation directly from Hebrew to English by the Jewish Publication Society can be found here or here, and an 1844 translation directly from the Septuagint by L. C. L. Brenton can be found here. Both translations are in the public domain.) In the Septuagint and Vulgate, this psalm is numbered Psalm 44.

#	Hebrew	English	Latin	Greek
(Note: In the Jewish verse numbering, the ascription of this psalm is verse 1, and the rest of the psalm begins from verse 2. However, the Christian verse numbering does not count the ascription as a separate verse.)	לַמְנַצֵּ֣חַ עַל־שֹׁ֭שַׁנִּים לִבְנֵי־קֹ֑רַח מַ֝שְׂכִּ֗יל שִׁ֣יר יְדִידֹֽת׃	(To the chief Musician upon Shoshannim, for the sons of Korah, Maschil, A Song of loves.)	In finem, pro iis, qui commutabuntur, filiis Core, ad intellectum, Canticum pro dilecto.	Εἰς τὸ τέλος, ὑπὲρ τῶν ἀλλοιωθησομένων· τοῖς υἱοῖς Κορὲ εἰς σύνεσιν· ᾠδὴ ὑπὲρ τοῦ ἀγαπητοῦ. -
1	רָ֘חַ֤שׁ לִבִּ֨י ׀ דָּ֘בָ֤ר ט֗וֹב אֹמֵ֣ר אָ֭נִי מַעֲשַׂ֣י לְמֶ֑לֶךְ לְ֝שׁוֹנִ֗י עֵ֤ט ׀ סוֹפֵ֬ר מָהִֽיר׃	My heart is inditing a good matter: I speak of the things which I have made touching the king: my tongue is the pen of a ready writer.	Eructavit cor meum verbum bonum: dico ego opera mea regi. Lingua mea calamus scribæ, velociter scribentis.	ΕΞΗΡΕΥΞΑΤΟ ἡ καρδία μου λόγον ἀγαθόν, λέγω ἐγὼ τὰ ἔργα μου τῷ βασιλεῖ, ἡ γλῶσσά μου κάλαμος γραμματέως ὀξυγράφου.
2	יׇפְיָפִ֡יתָ מִבְּנֵ֬י אָדָ֗ם ה֣וּצַק חֵ֭ן בְּשִׂפְתוֹתֶ֑יךָ עַל־כֵּ֤ן בֵּֽרַכְךָ֖ אֱלֹהִ֣ים לְעוֹלָֽם׃	Thou art fairer than the children of men: grace is poured into thy lips: therefore God hath blessed thee for ever.	Speciosus forma præ filiis hominum, diffusa est gratia in labiis tuis: propterea benedixit te Deus in æternum.	ὡραῖος κάλλει παρὰ τοὺς υἱοὺς τῶν ἀνθρώπων, ἐξεχύθη χάρις ἐν χείλεσί σου· διὰ τοῦτο εὐλόγησέ σε ὁ Θεὸς εἰς τὸν αἰῶνα.
3	חֲגֽוֹר־חַרְבְּךָ֣ עַל־יָרֵ֣ךְ גִּבּ֑וֹר ה֝וֹדְךָ֗ וַהֲדָרֶֽךָ׃	Gird thy sword upon thy thigh, O most mighty, with thy glory and thy majesty.	Accingere gladio tuo super femur tuum, potentissime,	περίζωσαι τὴν ῥομφαίαν σου ἐπὶ τὸν μηρόν σου, δυνατέ, τῇ ὡραιότητί σου καὶ τῷ κάλλει σου
4	וַהֲדָ֬רְךָ֨ ׀ צְלַ֬ח רְכַ֗ב עַֽל־דְּבַר־אֱ֭מֶת וְעַנְוָה־צֶ֑דֶק וְתוֹרְךָ֖ נוֹרָא֣וֹת יְמִינֶֽךָ׃	And in thy majesty ride prosperously because of truth and meekness and righteousness; and thy right hand shall teach thee terrible things.	Specie tua et pulchritudine tua intende, prospere procede, et regna, Propter veritatem et mansuetudinem, et iustitiam: et deducet te mirabiliter dextera tua.	καὶ ἔντεινον καὶ κατευοδοῦ καὶ βασίλευε ἕνεκεν ἀληθείας καὶ πρᾳότητος καὶ δικαιοσύνης, καὶ ὁδηγήσει σε θαυμαστῶς ἡ δεξιά σου.
5	חִצֶּ֗יךָ שְׁנ֫וּנִ֥ים עַ֭מִּים תַּחְתֶּ֣יךָ יִפְּל֑וּ בְּ֝לֵ֗ב אוֹיְבֵ֥י הַמֶּֽלֶךְ׃	Thine arrows are sharp in the heart of the king's enemies; whereby the people fall under thee.	Sagittæ tuæ acutæ, populi sub te cadent, in corda inimicorum regis.	τὰ βέλη σου ἠκονημένα, δυνατέ —λαοὶ ὑποκάτω σου πεσοῦνται— ἐν καρδίᾳ τῶν ἐχθρῶν τοῦ βασιλέως.
6	כִּסְאֲךָ֣ אֱ֭לֹהִים עוֹלָ֣ם וָעֶ֑ד שֵׁ֥בֶט מִ֝ישֹׁ֗ר שֵׁ֣בֶט מַלְכוּתֶֽךָ׃	Thy throne, O God, is for ever and ever: the sceptre of thy kingdom is a right sceptre.	Sedes tua Deus in sæculum sæculi: virga directionis virga regni tui.	ὁ θρόνος σου, ὁ Θεός, εἰς τὸν αἰῶνα τοῦ αἰῶνος, ράβδος εὐθύτητος ἡ ῥάβδος τῆς βασιλείας σου.
7	אָהַ֣בְתָּ צֶּדֶק֮ וַתִּשְׂנָ֫א־רֶ֥שַׁע עַל־כֵּ֤ן ׀ מְשָׁחֲךָ֡ אֱלֹהִ֣ים אֱ֭לֹהֶיךָ שֶׁ֥מֶן שָׂשׂ֗וֹן מֵחֲבֵרֶֽךָ׃	Thou lovest righteousness, and hatest wickedness: therefore God, thy God, hath anointed thee with the oil of gladness above thy fellows.	Dilexisti iustitiam, et odisti iniquitatem: propterea unxit te Deus Deus tuus oleo lætitiæ præ consortibus tuis.	ἠγάπησας δικαιοσύνην καὶ ἐμίσησας ἀνομίαν· διὰ τοῦτο ἔχρισέ σε ὁ Θεὸς ὁ Θεός σου ἔλαιον ἀγαλλιάσεως παρὰ τοὺς μετόχους σου.
8	מֹר־וַאֲהָל֣וֹת קְ֭צִיעוֹת כׇּל־בִּגְדֹתֶ֑יךָ מִֽן־הֵ֥יכְלֵי שֵׁ֝֗ן מִנִּ֥י שִׂמְּחֽוּךָ׃	All thy garments smell of myrrh, and aloes, and cassia, out of the ivory palaces, whereby they have made thee glad.	Myrrha, et gutta, et casia a vestimentis tuis, a domibus eburneis: ex quibus delectaverunt te	σμύρνα καὶ στακτὴ καὶ κασσία ἀπὸ τῶν ἱματίων σου ἀπὸ βάρεων ἐλεφαντίνων, ἐξ ὧν εὔφρανάν σε.
9	בְּנ֣וֹת מְ֭לָכִים בְּיִקְּרוֹתֶ֑יךָ נִצְּבָ֥ה שֵׁגַ֥ל לִ֝ימִינְךָ֗ בְּכֶ֣תֶם אוֹפִֽיר׃	Kings' daughters were among thy honourable women: upon thy right hand did stand the queen in gold of Ophir.	filiæ regum in honore tuo. Astitit regina a dextris tuis in vestitu deaurato: circumdata varietate.	θυγατέρας βασιλέων ἐν τῇ τιμῇ σου· παρέστη ἡ βασίλισσα ἐκ δεξιῶν σου ἐν ἱματισμῷ διαχρύσῳ περιβεβλημένη, πεποικιλμένη.
10	שִׁמְעִי־בַ֣ת וּ֭רְאִי וְהַטִּ֣י אׇזְנֵ֑ךְ וְשִׁכְחִ֥י עַ֝מֵּ֗ךְ וּבֵ֥ית אָבִֽיךְ׃	Hearken, O daughter, and consider, and incline thine ear; forget also thine own people, and thy father's house;	Audi filia, et vide, et inclina aurem tuam: et obliviscere populum tuum, et domum patris tui.	ἄκουσον, θύγατερ, καὶ ἴδε καὶ κλῖνον τὸ οὖς σου καὶ ἐπιλάθου τοῦ λαοῦ σου καὶ τοῦ οἴκου τοῦ πατρός σου·
11	וְיִתְאָ֣ו הַמֶּ֣לֶךְ יׇפְיֵ֑ךְ כִּי־ה֥וּא אֲ֝דֹנַ֗יִךְ וְהִשְׁתַּֽחֲוִי־לֽוֹ׃	So shall the king greatly desire thy beauty: for he is thy Lord; and worship thou him.	Et concupiscet rex decorem tuum: quoniam ipse est Dominus Deus tuus, et adorabunt eum.	καὶ ἐπιθυμήσει ὁ βασιλεὺς τοῦ κάλλους σου, ὅτι αὐτός ἐστι Κύριός σου,
12	וּבַֽת־צֹ֨ר ׀ בְּ֭מִנְחָה פָּנַ֥יִךְ יְחַלּ֗וּ עֲשִׁ֣ירֵי עָֽם׃	And the daughter of Tyre shall be there with a gift; even the rich among the people shall intreat thy favour.	Et filiæ Tyri in muneribus vultum tuum deprecabuntur: omnes divites plebis.	καὶ προσκυνήσεις αὐτῷ. καὶ θυγάτηρ Τύρου ἐν δώροις· τὸ πρόσωπόν σου λιτανεύσουσιν οἱ πλούσιοι τοῦ λαοῦ.
13	כׇּל־כְּבוּדָּ֣ה בַת־מֶ֣לֶךְ פְּנִ֑ימָה מִֽמִּשְׁבְּצ֖וֹת זָהָ֣ב לְבוּשָֽׁהּ׃	The king's daughter is all glorious within: her clothing is of wrought gold.	Omnis gloria eius filiæ regis ab intus, in fimbriis aureis circumamicta varietatibus.	πᾶσα ἡ δόξα τῆς θυγατρὸς τοῦ βασιλέως ἔσωθεν, ἐν κροσσωτοῖς χρυσοῖς περιβεβλημένη, πεποικιλμένη.
14	לִרְקָמוֹת֮ תּוּבַ֢ל לַ֫מֶּ֥לֶךְ בְּתוּל֣וֹת אַ֭חֲרֶיהָ רֵעוֹתֶ֑יהָ מ֖וּבָא֣וֹת לָֽךְ׃	She shall be brought unto the king in raiment of needlework: the virgins her companions that follow her shall be brought unto thee.	Adducentur regi virgines post eam: proximæ eius afferentur tibi.	ἀπενεχθήσονται τῷ βασιλεῖ παρθένοι ὀπίσω αὐτῆς, αἱ πλησίον αὐτῆς ἀπενεχθήσονταί σοι·
15	תּ֭וּבַלְנָה בִּשְׂמָחֹ֣ת וָגִ֑יל תְּ֝בֹאֶ֗ינָה בְּהֵ֣יכַל מֶֽלֶךְ׃	With gladness and rejoicing shall they be brought: they shall enter into the king's palace.	Afferentur in lætitia et exultatione: adducentur in templum regis.	ἀπενεχθήσονται ἐν εὐφροσύνῃ καὶ ἀγαλλιάσει, ἀχθήσονται εἰς ναὸν βασιλέως.
16	תַּ֣חַת אֲ֭בֹתֶיךָ יִהְי֣וּ בָנֶ֑יךָ תְּשִׁיתֵ֥מוֹ לְ֝שָׂרִ֗ים בְּכׇל־הָאָֽרֶץ׃	Instead of thy fathers shall be thy children, whom thou mayest make princes in all the earth.	Pro patribus tuis nati sunt tibi filii: constitues eos principes super omnem terram.	ἀντὶ τῶν πατέρων σου ἐγενήθησαν υἱοί σου· καταστήσεις αὐτοὺς ἄρχοντας ἐπὶ πᾶσαν τὴν γῆν.
17	אַזְכִּ֣ירָה שִׁ֭מְךָ בְּכׇל־דֹּ֣ר וָדֹ֑ר עַל־כֵּ֥ן עַמִּ֥ים יְ֝הוֹד֗וּךָ לְעֹלָ֥ם וָעֶֽד׃	I will make thy name to be remembered in all generations: therefore shall the people praise thee for ever and ever.	Memores erunt nominis tui in omni generatione et generationem. Propterea populi confitebuntur tibi in æternum: et in sæculum sæculi.	μνησθήσομαι τοῦ ὀνόματός σου ἐν πάσῃ γενεᾷ καὶ γενεᾷ· διὰ τοῦτο λαοὶ ἐξομολογήσονταί σοι εἰς τὸν αἰῶνα καὶ εἰς τὸν αἰῶνα τοῦ αἰῶνος.

=== Revised Standard Version ===
The verse marking for this psalm in the Revised Standard Version (RSV) differs from that used in other translations.

== Sources ==
- Dahood, Mitchell (1966), Psalms I: 1–50, Anchor Bible Series, Garden City, NY: Doubleday & Co
- Falk, Rabbi Pesach Eliyahu (1998). Modesty, an Adornment for Life: Halachos and Attitudes Concerning Tznius of Dress & Conduct. Feldheim Publishers. p. 560. ISBN 9780873068741.
- Kirkpatrick, A.F. (1901), The Book of Psalms, The Cambridge Bible for Schools and Colleges, Cambridge University Press
- Rhodes, Arnold B. (1960), The Book of Psalms, The Layman's Bible Commentary, Richmond, VA: John Knox Press
