= Romans 13 =

- ← chapter 12 chapter 14 →
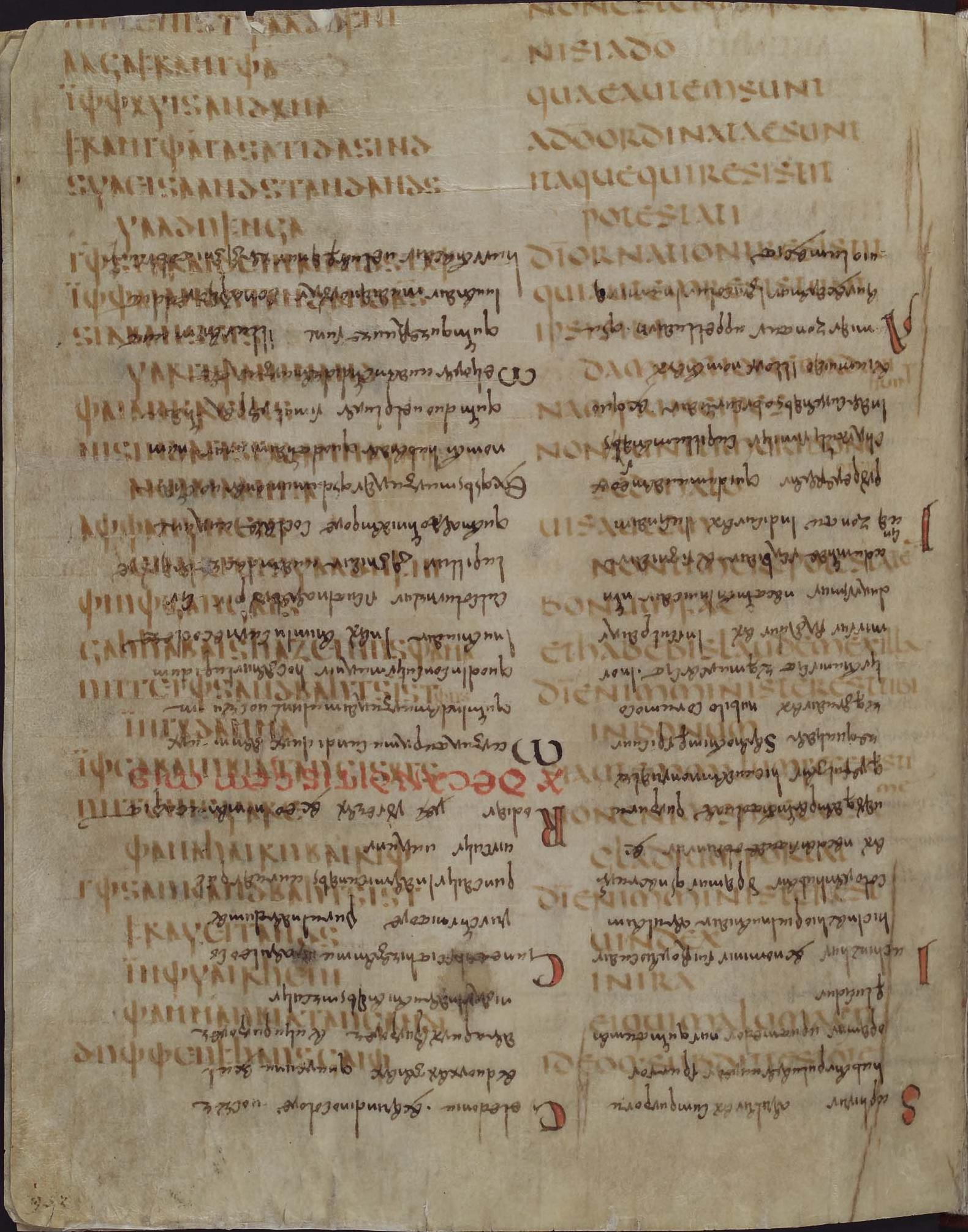
- Folio 256 verso of Codex Guelferbytanus 64 Weissenburgensis, p. 507, showing palimpsest with Romans 12:17–13:1 of Codex Carolinus at the lower layer; and Isidore of Seville's writings at the upper layer in reverse
- Book: Epistle to the Romans
- Category: Pauline epistles
- Christian Bible part: New Testament
- Order in the Christian part: 6

Romans 13 is the thirteenth chapter of the Epistle to the Romans in the New Testament of the Christian Bible. It was authored by Paul the Apostle, while he was in Corinth in the mid-50s AD, with the help of an amanuensis (secretary), Tertius, who adds his own greeting in Romans 16:22.

In this chapter, Paul reminds his readers that they should honour and obey the government authorities. Reformer Martin Luther suggested that "he includes this, not because it makes people virtuous in the sight of God, but because it does insure that the virtuous have outward peace and protection and that the wicked cannot do evil without fear and in undisturbed peace".

== Text ==
The original text was written in Koine Greek. This chapter is divided into 14 verses.

=== Textual witnesses ===
Some early manuscripts containing the text of this chapter are:

- In Greek:
  - Codex Vaticanus (AD 325–350)
  - Codex Sinaiticus (330–360)
  - Codex Alexandrinus (400–440)
  - Codex Ephraemi Rescriptus (~450; extant verses 11–14)
- in Gothic language
  - Codex Carolinus (6th/7th century; extant: verses 1–5)
- in Latin
  - Codex Carolinus (6th/7th century; extant: verses 1–5)

== Context ==
Paul wrote to the Roman Christians because he was "eager to preach the gospel" to them, so as to remind them on "certain subjects". Although he had been hindered from coming to them many times, he longed to encourage the Roman church by reminding them of the gospel, because of his calling to the Gentiles as well as to the Jews.

In chapter 12, Paul has called on the Roman believers not to be "conformed to this age". Hill notes that "a discussion of civil authority follows naturally if not necessarily" from Paul's preceding teaching, and that although "it is reasonable to suppose that one who lives in a new age is free of the old age", the reality of the situation is that both exist alongside each other.

== Contents ==
=== Love your neighbour (verse 9) ===
The commandments, "You shall not commit adultery; You shall not murder; You shall not steal; You shall not covet"; and any other commandment, are summed up in this word, "Love your neighbor as yourself."

— Romans 13:9 (New Revised Standard Version),

Verse 9 alludes to Exodus 20:13–15, Deuteronomy 5:17–19, 21, and Leviticus 19:18. The King James Bible includes "You shall not bear false witness" in the verse because of its presence in the Textus Receptus. The Cambridge Bible for Schools and Colleges suggests that it is "perhaps to be omitted, on documentary evidence".

=== The day is at hand (verses 11–14) ===
Besides this, you know what time it is, how it is now the moment for you to wake from sleep. For salvation is nearer to us now than when we became believers; ^{12}the night is far gone, the day is near. Let us then lay aside the works of darkness and put on the armor of light; ^{13}let us live honorably as in the day, not in reveling and drunkenness, not in debauchery and licentiousness, not in quarreling and jealousy. ^{14}Instead, put on the Lord Jesus Christ, and make no provision for the flesh, to gratify its desires.

— Romans 13:11–14 (New Revised Standard Version),

Non-conformist theologian Matthew Henry calls verses 11–14 "a Christian's directory for his day's work". According to the Cambridge Bible for Schools and Colleges, "Paul enforces all the preceding precepts (of chapters 12 and 13) by the solemn assertion of the approach of the eternal Day of Resurrection and Glory", "for now is our salvation nearer than when we believed" (King James Version). Many translations, such as the New King James Version and Revised Standard Version, refer to "when we first believed".

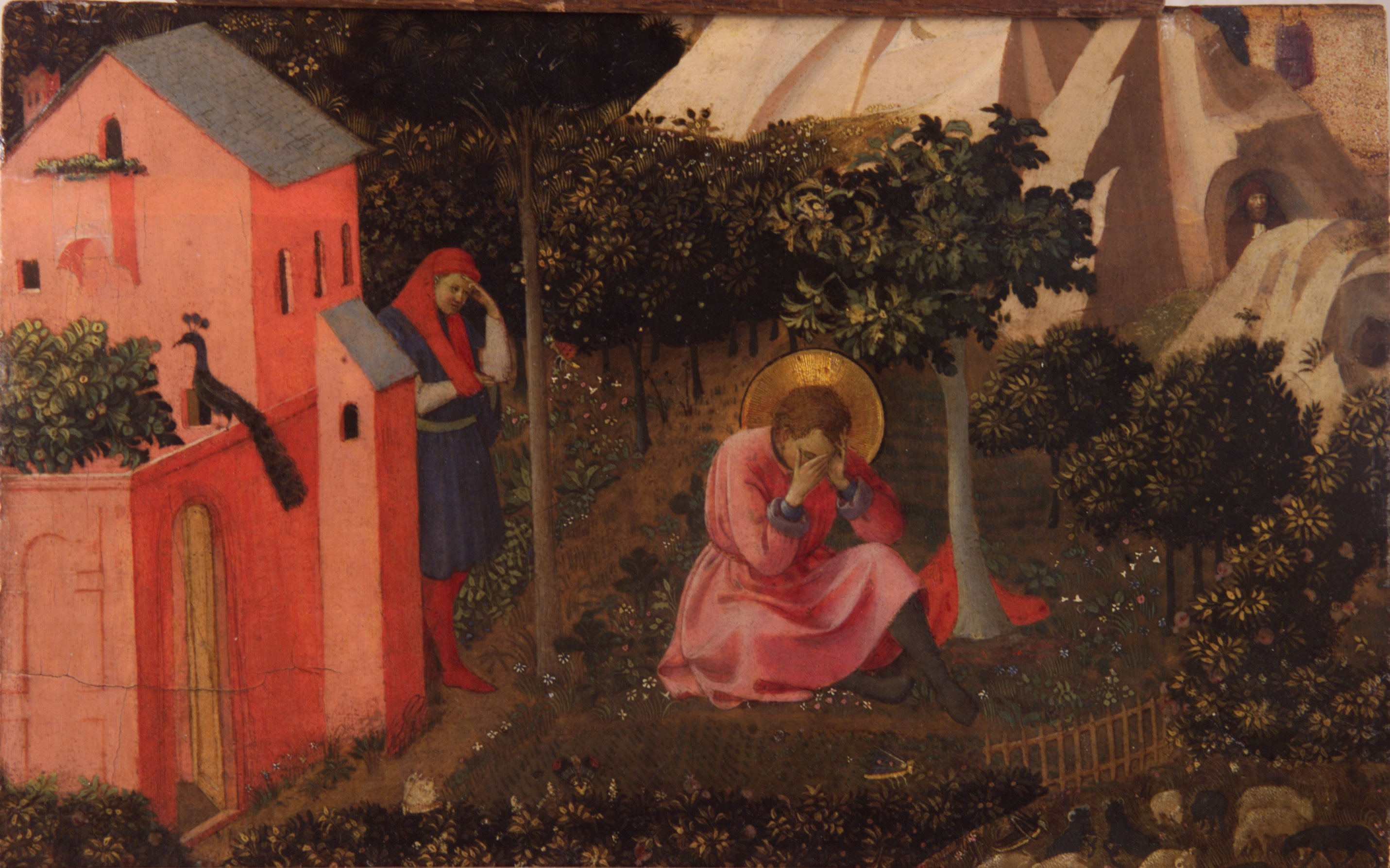
The Conversion of St. Augustine by Fra Angelico

In late August of 386, at the age of 31, Augustine of Hippo converted to Christianity. As Augustine later told it, his conversion was prompted by hearing a child's voice say "take up and read" (Latin: tolle, lege). Resorting to the sortes biblicae, he opened a book of St. Paul's writings (Confessiones 8.12.29) at random and read Romans 13:13–14."

== Political meaning and use ==
In this chapter, Paul reminds his readers that they should honour and obey the secular authorities. Some interpreters have claimed that this implies that Christians are to obey all public officials under all circumstances. Many interpreters and biblical scholars dispute this view, however. Thomas Aquinas interprets Paul's derivation of authority from God as conditional on the circumstances in which authority is obtained and the manner in which it is used:

The order of authority derives from God, as the Apostle says [in Romans 13:1–7]. For this reason, the duty of obedience is, for the Christian, a consequence of this derivation of authority from God, and ceases when that ceases. But, as we have already said, authority may fail to derive from God for two reasons: either because of the way in which authority has been obtained, or in consequence of the use which is made of it.

Petr Chelčický interpreted the verse in the sense that it was addressed in a pagan age with a pagan society telling Christians that a Christian out of humility should submit to such pagan practices, but that in a Christian society such pagan practices should not be imposed in any way.

According to biblical scholars John Barton and John Muddiman:

Few if any passages in the Pauline corpus have been more subject to abuse than verses 1–7. Paul does not indicate that one is required to obey public officials under all circumstances, nor does he say that every exercise of civil authority is sanctioned by God. No particular government is authorized; no universal autarchy is legitimated. Instead, Paul reiterates the common Jewish view that human governance operates under God's superintendency (Jn 19:11; Dan 2:21; Prov 8:15—16; Isa 45:1—3; Wis 6:3), that it is part of the divine order and so is meant for human good (i Pet 2:13–14; Ep. Arist. 291–2).

On occasion, Romans 13 is employed in civil discourse and by politicians and philosophers in support of or against political issues. Two conflicting arguments are made: that the passage mandates obedience to civil law; and that there are limits to authority beyond which obedience is not required. John Calvin, in Institutes of the Christian Religion took the latter position: "that we might not yield a slavish obedience to the depraved wishes of men". Martin Luther employed Romans 13 in Against the Robbing and Murdering Hordes of Peasants to advocate that it would be sinful for a prince or lord not to use force, including violent force, to fulfil the duties of their office.

Theologian Paul Tillich is critical of an interpretation that would cast Romans 13:1–7 in opposition to revolutionary movements:

One of the many politico-theological abuses of biblical statements is the understanding of Paul's words [Romans 13:1–7] as justifying the anti-revolutionary bias of some churches, particularly the Lutheran. But neither these words nor any other New Testament statement deals with the methods of gaining political power. In Romans, Paul is addressing eschatological enthusiasts, not a revolutionary political movement.

Daniel J. Harrington suggests that Romans 13:1–7 is not about the doctrine of church and state. Under the emperor Claudius (AD 41–54), the Jews in Rome (including Jewish Christians) were expelled from the city. In AD 56–57 when Paul wrote to the Roman Christians, they had only recently been allowed to return. It is possible that the passage was intended as a piece of pragmatic advice addressed to a specific crisis, calling for patient cooperation with the Roman officials for the time being while waiting for the imminent manifestation of God's kingdom.

Romans 13 was used during the period of the American Revolution both by loyalists who preached obedience to the Crown and by revolutionaries who argued for freedom from the unjust authority of the King. Later in US history, Romans 13 was employed by anti-abolitionists to justify and legitimize the keeping of slaves; notably around the time of the Fugitive Slave Act of 1850 which precipitated debate as to whether the law should be obeyed or resisted. It was also used by the Dutch Reformed Church to justify apartheid rule in South Africa.

In June 2018, Romans 13 was used by Jeff Sessions to justify the Trump administration family separation policy, saying:

I would cite you to the Apostle Paul and his clear and wise command in Romans 13 to obey the laws of the government because God has ordained them for the purpose of order. Orderly and lawful processes are good in themselves and protect the weak and lawful.

Commenting on the fight to define Romans 13, historian Lincoln Mullen argues that "what the attorney general actually has on his side is the thread of American history that justifies oppression and domination in the name of law and order."

== See also ==
- Ten Commandments
- Greatest commandment
- The powers that be
- Render unto Caesar, another Biblical discussion of how Christians should interact with secular authorities
- Related Bible parts: Exodus 20, Leviticus 19, Deuteronomy 5

== Bibliography ==
- Coogan, Michael David (2007). Coogan, Michael David; Brettler, Marc Zvi; Newsom, Carol Ann; Perkins, Pheme (eds.). The New Oxford Annotated Bible with the Apocryphal/Deuterocanonical Books: New Revised Standard Version, Issue 48 (Augmented 3rd ed.). Oxford University Press. ISBN 9780195288810.
- Hill, Craig C. (2007). "64. Romans". In Barton, John; Muddiman, John (eds.). The Oxford Bible Commentary (first (paperback) ed.). Oxford University Press. pp. 1083–1108. ISBN 978-0199277186.
