= Papyrus 118 =

- New Testament manuscript
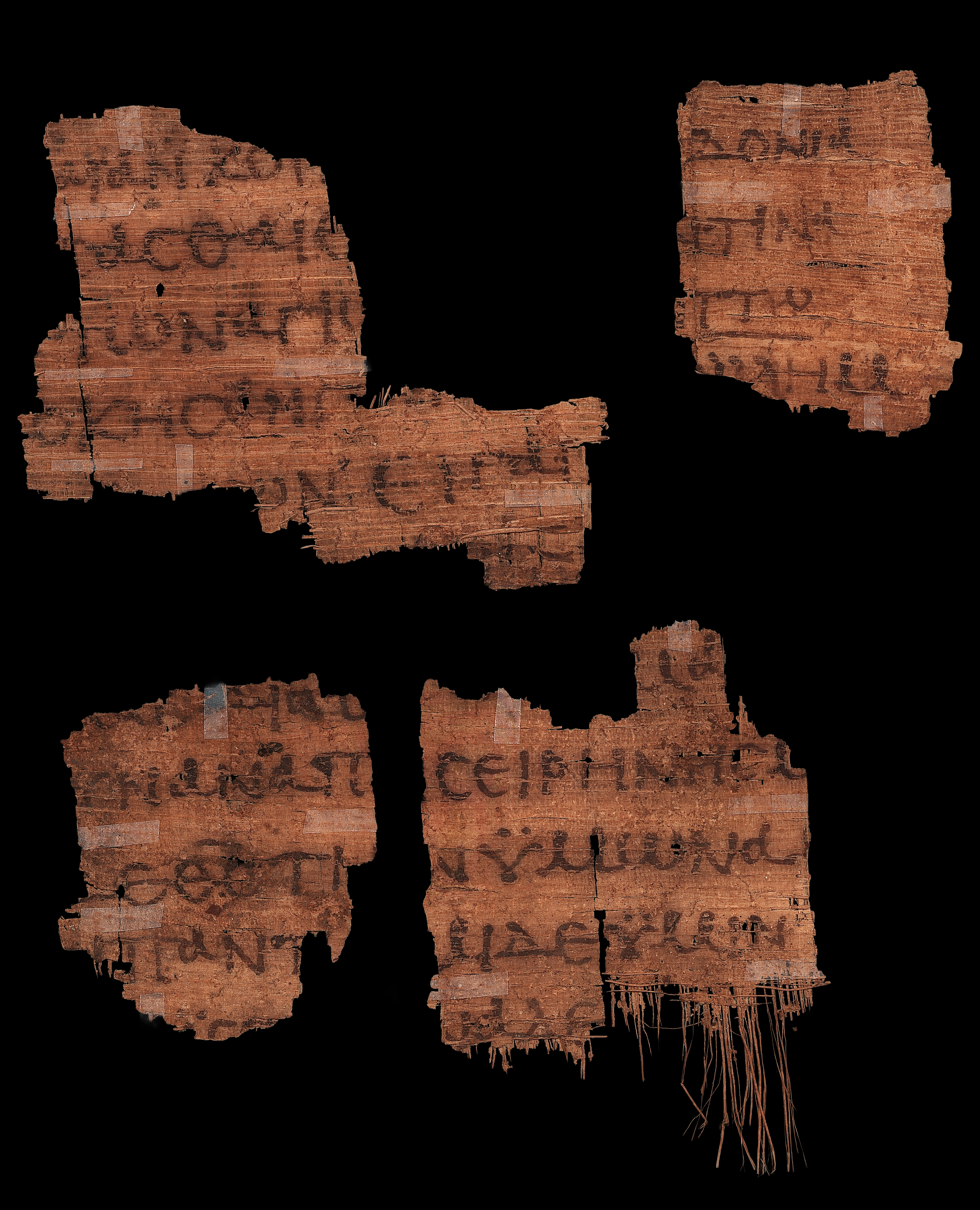
- Recto, Romans 15:26-27, 15:32-16:1
- Sign: 𝔓^{118}
- Text: Epistle to the Romans 15:26-27,32-33; 16:1,4-7,11-12
- Date: 3rd-6th century
- Script: Greek
- Now at: University of Cologne
- Cite: G. Schenke, Kölner Papyri 10 (2003), pp. 33-37
- Size: 29 x 26 cm
- Type: (?)
- Category: none

Papyrus 118 is a small papyrus manuscript of the Epistle to the Romans from the New Testament. It is designated by the siglum 𝔓^{118} in the Gregory-Aland numbering of New Testament manuscripts.

The manuscript is in fragmentary condition, containing text from Romans chapters 15 and 16. Using the study of comparative writing styles (paleography), the manuscript was originally dated to the 3rd century CE, but more recent scholarship has suggested that the range of possible dates of production could extend considerably later, to the fifth or sixth century CE.

== Description ==
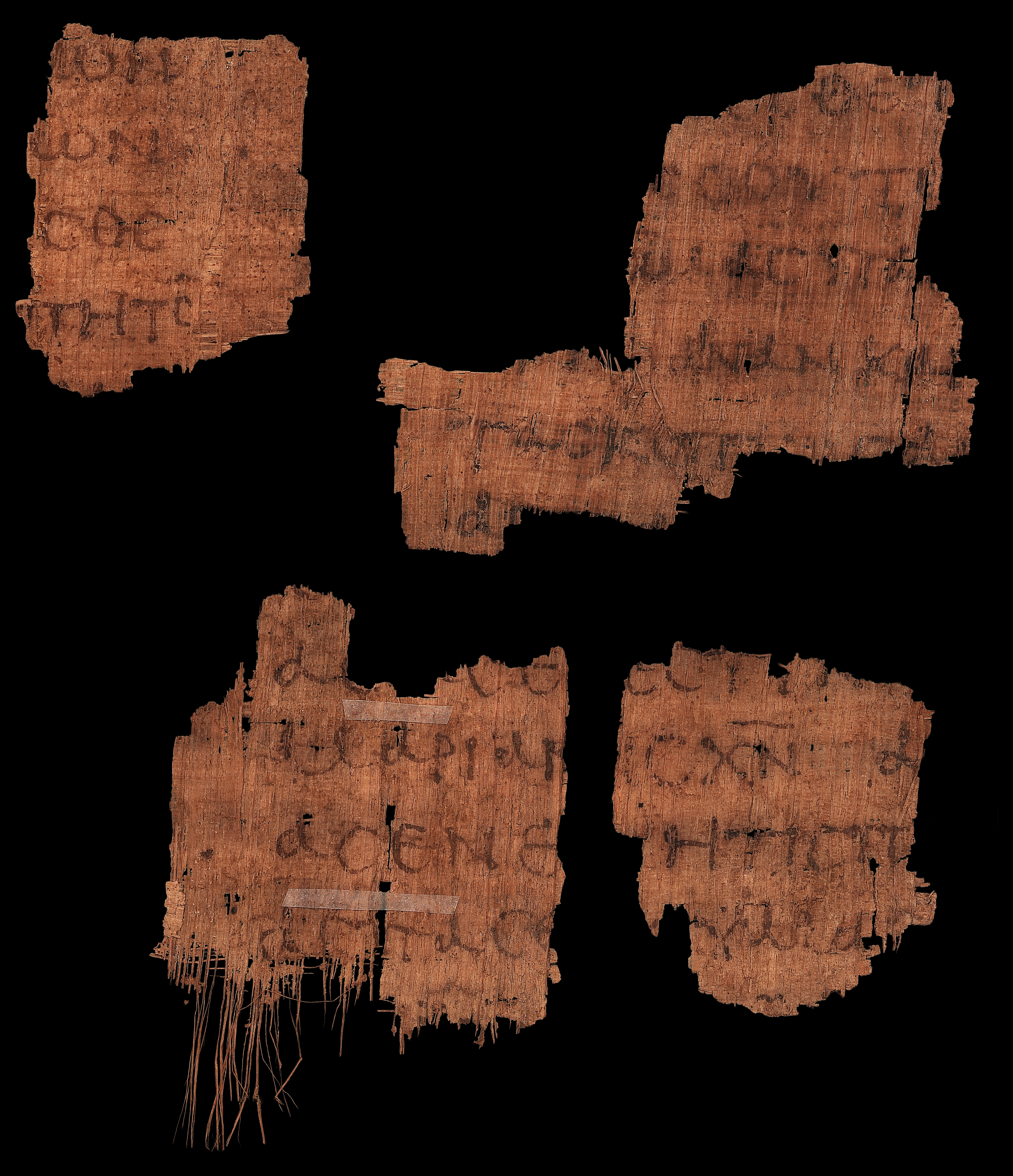
Verso, Romans 16:4-7, 16:11-12

The papyrus was likely a codex (precursor to the modern book format), containing at least the Epistle to the Romans, of which only verses 15:26-27, 32-33, and 16:1,4-7,11-12 are extant. The text was written in two columns per page.

== Text ==
The Greek text of this codex is too small to determine its textual character. It runs directly from Romans 15:33 through to 16:1, whereas some manuscripts (such as 𝔓^{46}) have what is traditionally Romans 16:25-27 between Romans 15:33 and 16:1.

== History ==
The earliest history of the manuscript is unknown. The codex is currently housed at the Institut für Altertumskunde of the University of Cologne at Cologne, with the shelf number (Inv. No. 10311).

== See also ==
- List of New Testament papyri
- Epistle to the Romans: chapter 15 and 16

== Images ==
- Papyrus 118 at the Kölner Papyrus-sammlung
- Image from 𝔓^{118} recto, fragment of Romans 15:26-27,32-33
- Image from 𝔓^{118} verso, fragment of Romans 16:1,4-7,11-12
