= Papyrus 61 =

Papyrus 𝔓^{61}
- New Testament manuscript
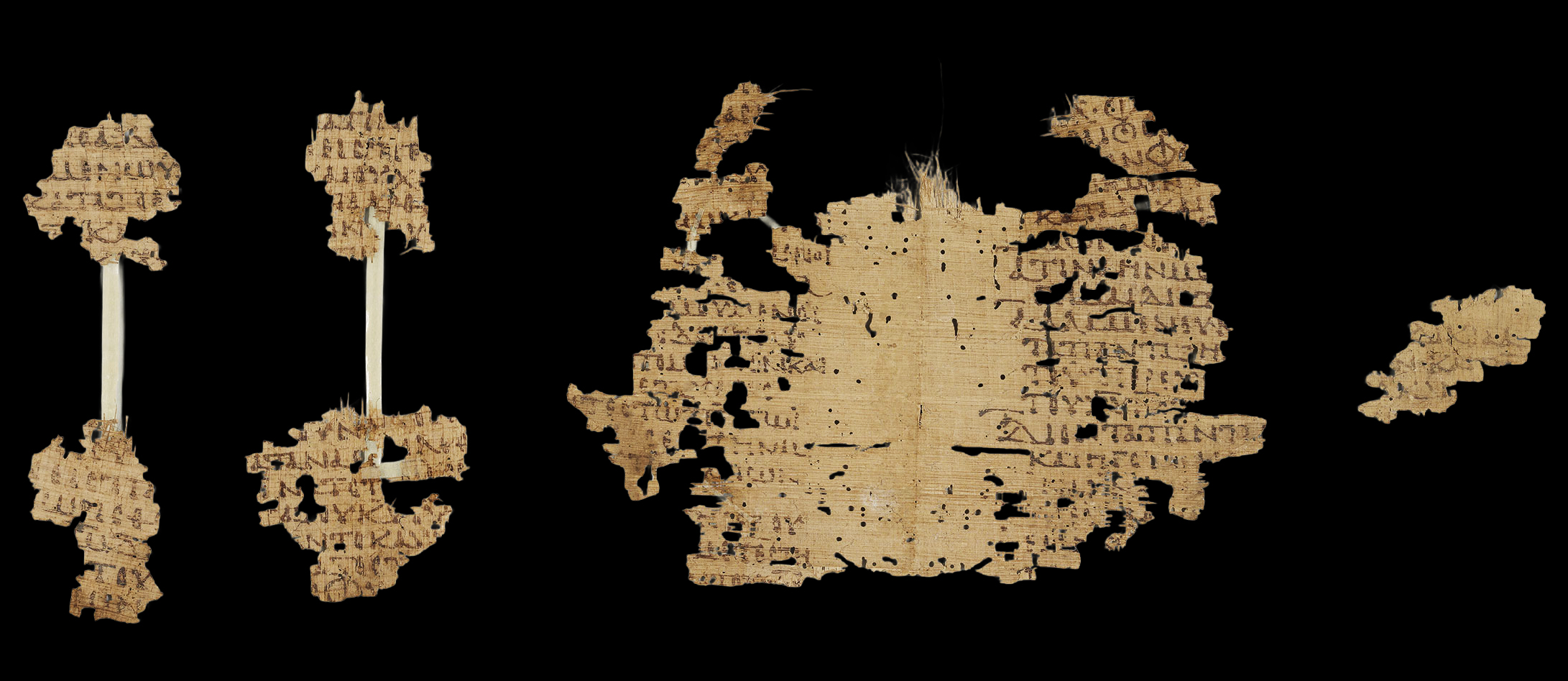
- Fragments1-4 verso, 1Cor 5:1-3,5-6; Col 4:15; Phil 3:5-9; Rom 16:23,25-27; Col 1:9-13-1
- Text: Pauline epistles †
- Date: c. 600-700
- Script: Greek
- Found: Nessana, Palestina
- Now at: The Morgan Library & Museum
- Cite: L. Casson, and E.L. Hettich, Excavations at Nessana II, Literary Papyri (Princeton: 1946), pp. 112-122.
- Size: 25 cm x 17 cm
- Type: Alexandrian text-type
- Category: II

Papyrus 61 (in the Gregory-Aland numbering), signed by 𝔓^{61}, is a copy of the New Testament in Greek. It is a papyrus manuscript of the Pauline epistles. The manuscript paleographically has been assigned to the 7th to 8th century.

Contents

Ro 16:23-27; 1 Cor 1:1-2.4-6; 5:1-3.5-6.9-13; Philip 3:5-9.12-16; Col 1:3-7.1:9-13;4:15; 1 Thes 1:2-3; Titus 3:1-5; 3:8-11; 3:14-15; Philemon 1:4-7.

Text

The Greek text of this codex is a representative of the Alexandrian text-type. Kurt Aland placed it in Category II.

Location

It is currently housed at the Morgan Library & Museum (P. Colt 5) in New York City.

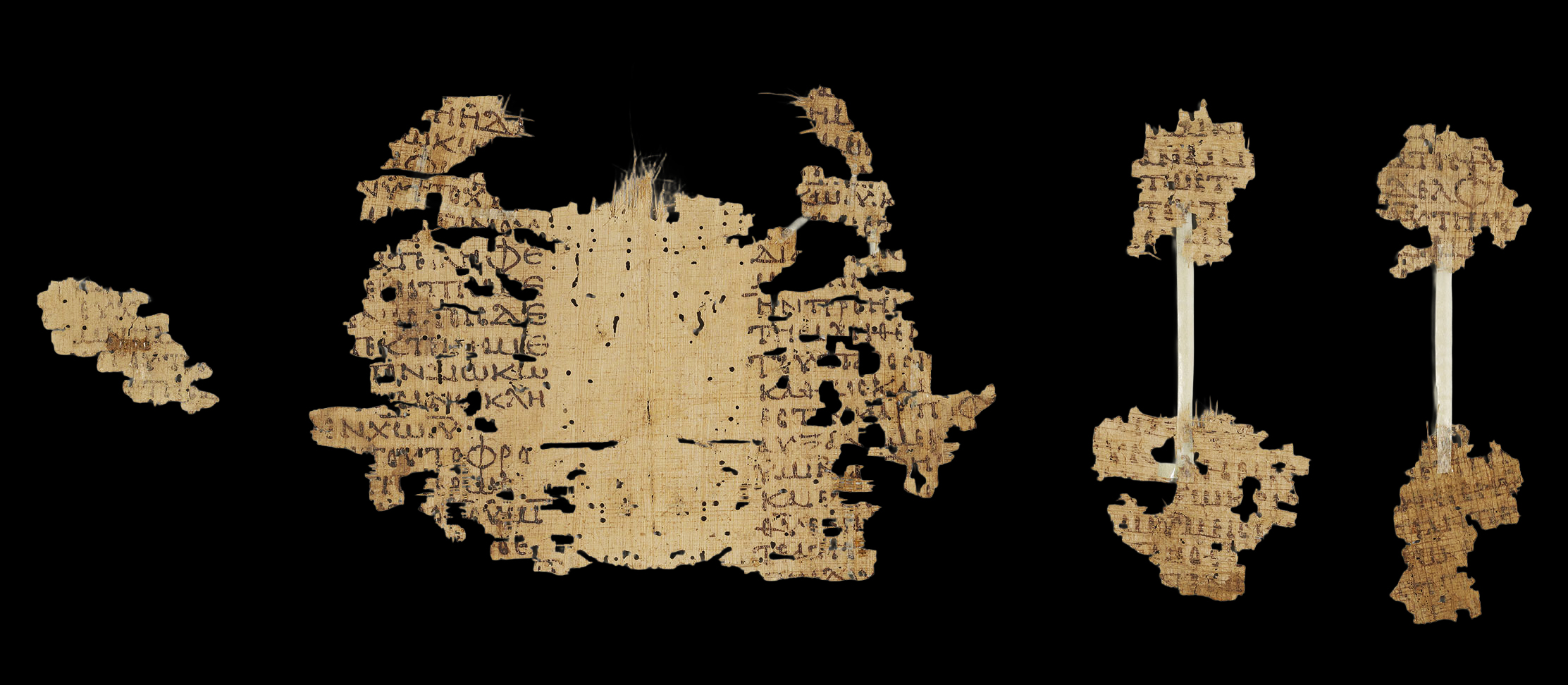
Fragments1-4 verso, 1Cor 1:1-2,4-5; 1Cor 5:9-13; 1Thess 1:2-3; Col 1:3-7; Phil 3:12-16-2

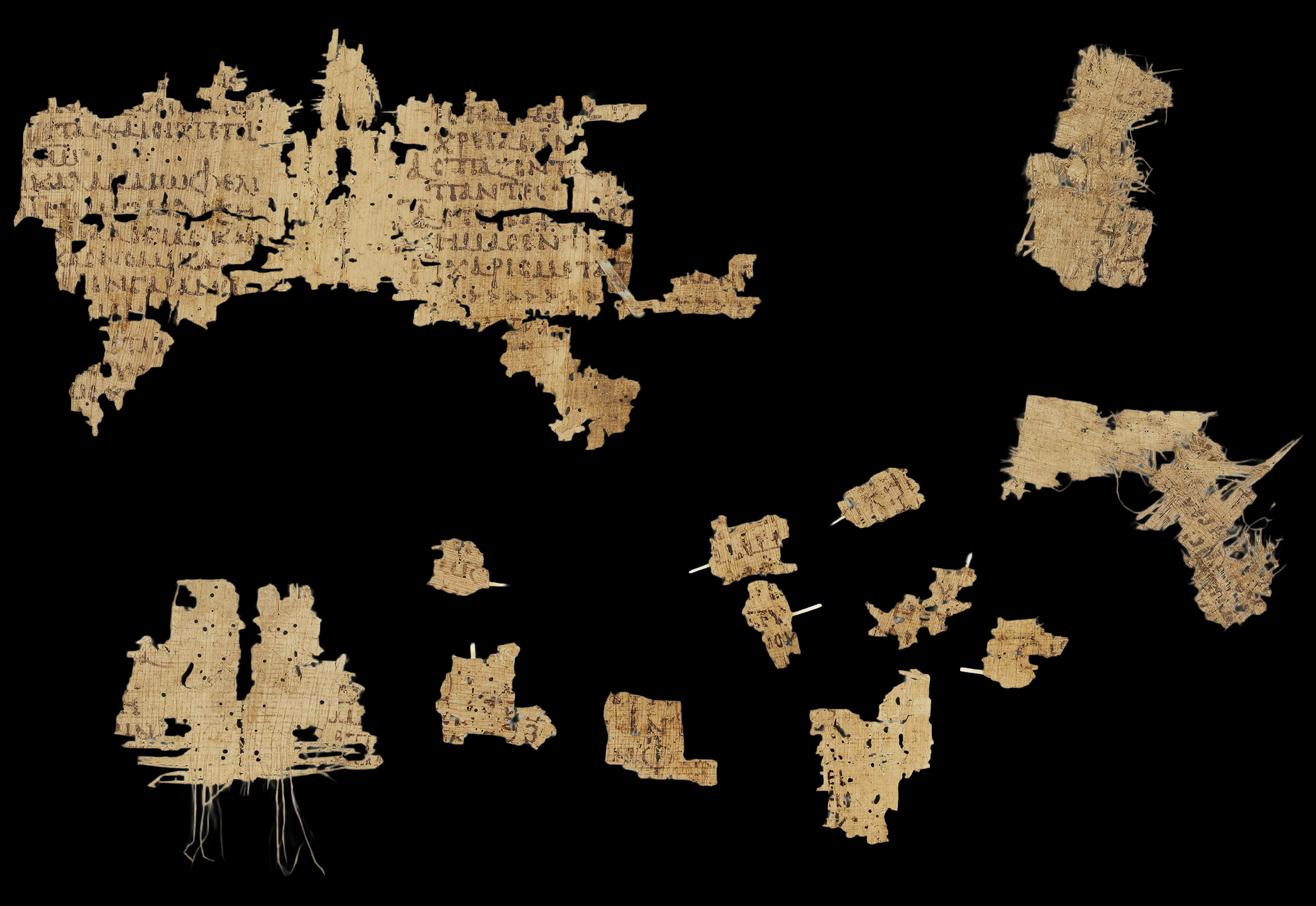
Fragments 5+ recto, 1Cor 1:1-2; 1Cor 5:1-2; Titus 3:8-11,14-15; Rom 16:23,25-3

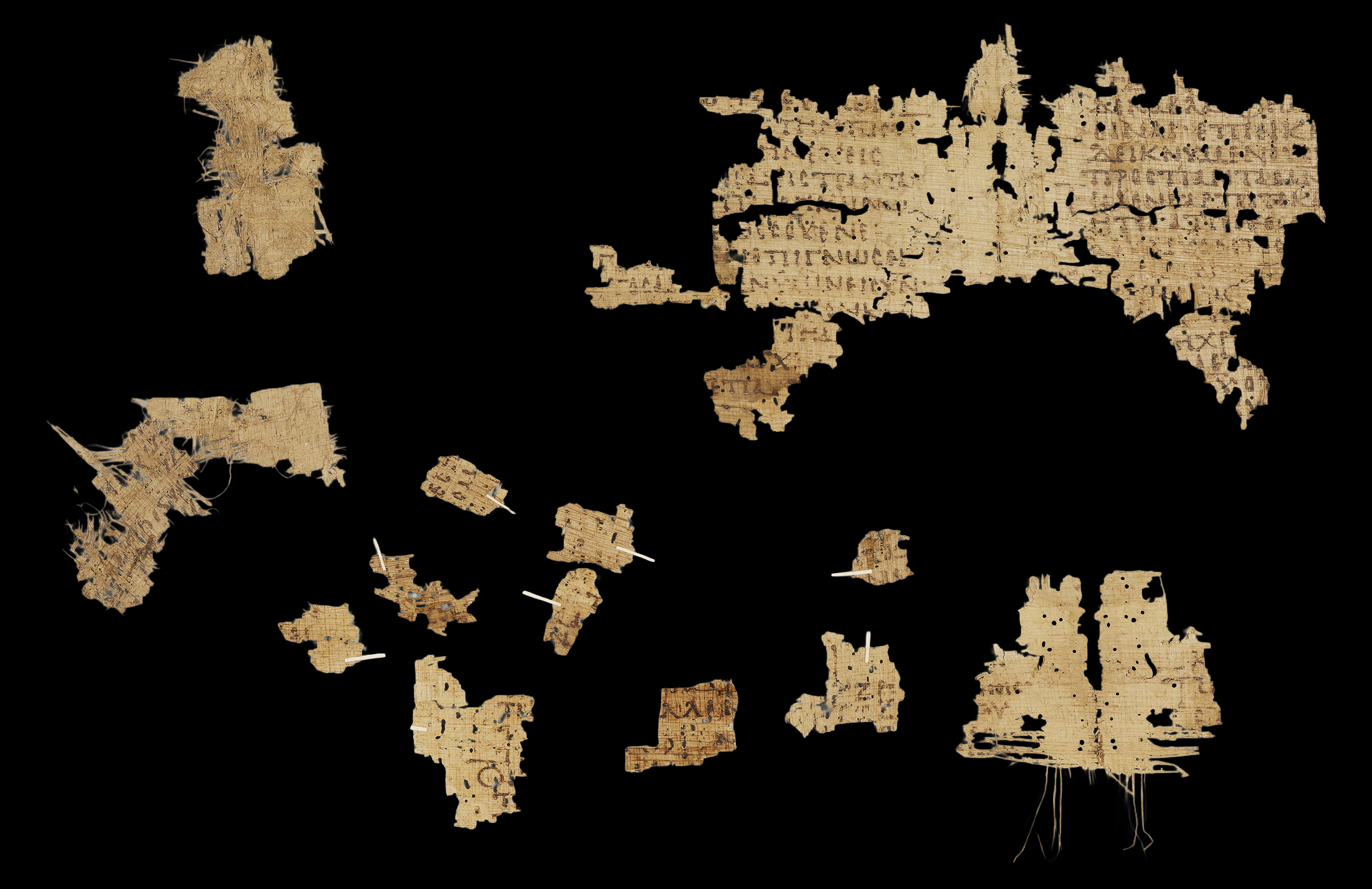
Fragments 5+ verso, 1Cor 5:9-10; Phlm 1:4-7; Titus 3:1-5-4

== See also ==
- List of New Testament papyri
- Related Bible parts: Romans 16; 1 Corinthians 1; 1 Corinthians 5; Philippians 3; 1 Thessalonians 1; Titus 3; Philemon
