= Shoshannim =

Shoshannim (Hebrew ששנים, 'lilies') is mentioned in Psalm 45 and Psalm 69. Its meaning in these Psalms is uncertain. Some believe it to be a kind of lily-shaped straight trumpet, a six-stringed instrument, a word commencing a song or the melody to which these psalms were to be sung.

The Hebrew root word used is Psalm 45 and 69 according to Strong's Exhaustive Concordance is Strong's #7799 defined as "probably any lily-like flower".

The tenor bell of St Peter's Church, Chertsey (England), cast in 1670 by Bryan(?) Eldridge of Chertsey (maybe in itself a recasting of an earlier Chertsey Abbey bell), was recast in 1859 by George Mears of the Whitechapel Bell Foundry at the expense of Angela Burdett-Coutts, and by her specially named "Shoshannim".

== See also ==
- Erev Shel Shoshanim
