= Romans 15 =

- ← chapter 14 chapter 16 →
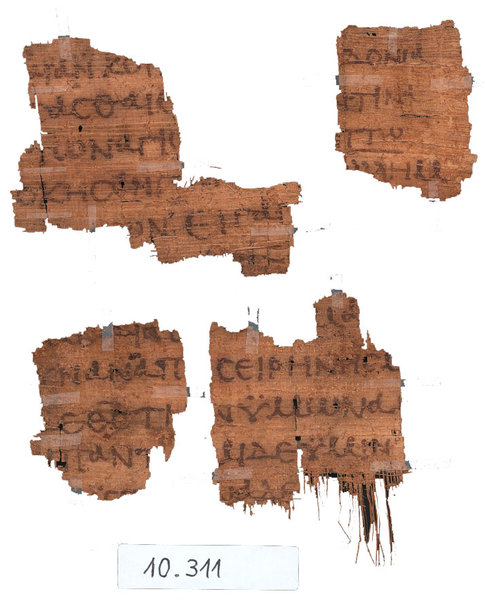
- Epistle to the Romans 15:26–27, 32–33 in Papyrus 118, written in the 3rd century
- Book: Epistle to the Romans
- Category: Pauline epistles
- Christian Bible part: New Testament
- Order in the Christian part: 6

Romans 15 is the fifteenth chapter of the Epistle to the Romans in the New Testament of the Christian Bible. It is authored by Paul the Apostle, while he was in Corinth in the mid-50s AD, with the help of an amanuensis (secretary), Tertius, who adds his own greeting in Romans 16:22.

According to Martin Luther,

In chapter 15, St. Paul cites Christ as an example to show that we must also have patience with the weak, even those who fail by sinning publicly or by their disgusting morals. We must not cast them aside but must bear with them until they become better. That is the way Christ treated us and still treats us every day; he puts up with our vices, our wicked morals and all our imperfection, and he helps us ceaselessly. Finally Paul prays for the Christians at Rome; he praises them and commends them to God. He points out his own office and the message that he preaches. He makes an unobtrusive plea for a contribution for the poor in Jerusalem. Unalloyed love is the basis of all he says and does.

== Text ==
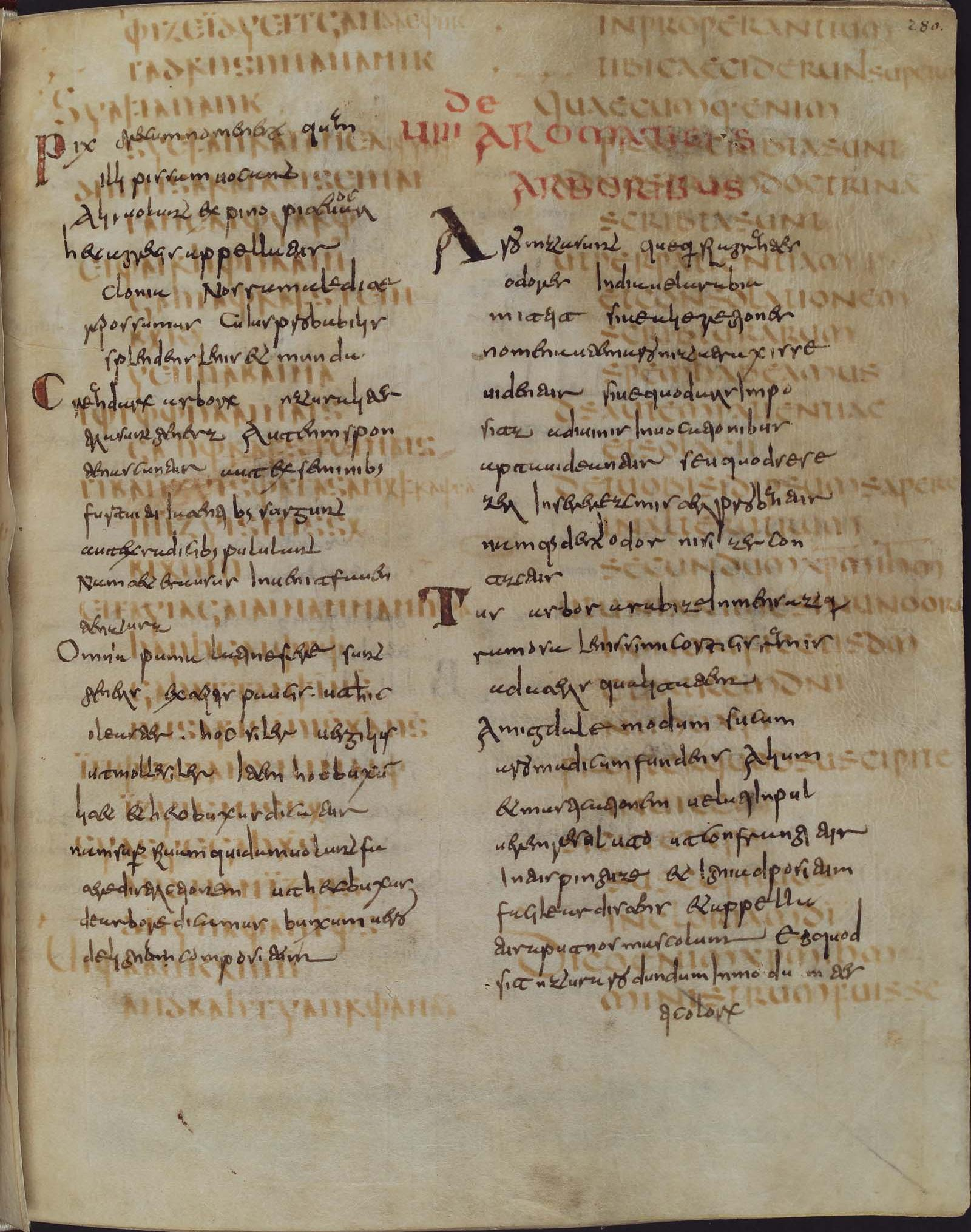
Romans 15:3–8 on Codex Carolinus

The original text was written in Koine Greek.

=== Textual witnesses ===
Some early manuscripts containing the text of this chapter are:

- In Greek:
  - Papyrus 118 (3rd century; extant verses 26–27, 32–33)
  - Codex Vaticanus (AD 325–350)
  - Codex Sinaiticus (330–360)
  - Codex Alexandrinus (400–440)
  - Codex Ephraemi Rescriptus (~450; complete)
- In Gothic language
  - Codex Carolinus (6th/7th century; extant verses 3–13)
- In Latin
  - Codex Carolinus (6th/7th century; extant verses 3–13)

=== Old Testament references ===
- Romans 15:3 references Psalm 69:9
- Romans 15:9 references 2 Samuel 22:50 and Psalm 18:49
- Romans 15:10 references Deuteronomy 32:43
- Romans 15:11 references Psalm 117:1
- Romans 15:12 references Isaiah 11:10
- Romans 15:21 references Isaiah 52:15

=== New Testament references ===
- Romans 15:4 references 2 Timothy 3:16
- Romans 15:5 references 1 Corinthians 1:10

== Theme ==
According to Lutheran theologian Harold Buls, much of chapter 15 continues the theme of the weak and strong which Paul had addressed in chapter 14, but the application is now wider than to adiaphora (things neither commanded nor forbidden). Buls observes that:

[T]he strong are those who are well-grounded in Scripture and also in practice. The weak are not so well-grounded.

Verses 14 to 21 refer to Paul's "special ministry to the Gentiles", and verses 22 to 29 relate to Paul's plans to visit the Christian community in Rome.

== The scriptures ==
=== Verses 3-4 ===
In verse 3, Paul quotes from the Septuagint translation of Psalm 69:

Christ did not please Himself; but as it is written, 'The reproaches of those who reproached You fell on Me'.

He then continues, in order to establish that Christian liberty should be lived out in the service of others and with forbearance towards the weak:

For whatever things were written before were written for our learning, that we through the patience and comfort of the Scriptures might have hope.

— Romans 15:4, New King James Version

Theologian William Robertson Nicoll states that "everything that was written before" refers to "the whole Old Testament". Lutheran theologian Johann Arndt paraphrases this verse as:

The Old Testament was written for our instruction, that we might learn patience, be given comfort, and retain our blessed hope.

Anglican Bishop Handley Moule, writing in the Cambridge Bible for Schools and Colleges (1891), suggests that Paul develops here "a great principle, namely, that the Old Testament was throughout designed for the instruction and establishment of New Testament believers". The author of 2 Timothy elaborates a similar point in 2 Timothy 3:15–16:

The sacred writings [...] are able to give [us] the wisdom that leads to salvation through faith which is in Christ Jesus. All Scripture is inspired by God and profitable for teaching, for reproof, for correction, for training in righteousness.

— 2 Timothy 3:15–16, New King James Version

== The gentiles ==
=== Verse 9 ===
And that the Gentiles might glorify God for his mercy; as it is written, For this cause I will confess to thee among the Gentiles, and sing unto thy name.

— Romans 15:9, King James Version

In verse 8, Paul refers to Jesus Christ as having become the servant of the circumcision (i.e. servant of the Abrahamic covenant: in διάκονον ... περιτομῆς, diakonon ... peritomēs but also translated as 'minister of the circumcised' or 'servant of the Jews'), and then finds and quotes four extracts from the Old Testament which refer to the gentiles (τα εθνη, ta ethne): 2 Samuel 22:50 (referenced in Psalm 18:49); Deuteronomy 32:43; Psalm 117:1 and Isaiah 11:10.

Theologian Albert Barnes says that Jesus "exercised his office – the office of the Messiah – among the Jews, or with respect to the Jews [...] He was born a Jew; was circumcised; came "to" that nation; and died in their midst, without having gone himself to any other people", but with three objectives in mind:

- for the truth of God
- to confirm the promises made to the fathers
- and that the Gentiles [...] might [also] glorify God.

=== Verse 12 ===
And again, Isaiah says: "There shall be a root of Jesse; And He who shall rise to reign over the Gentiles, In Him the Gentiles shall hope."

— Romans 15:12, New King James Version

The text of verse 12 is taken from Isaiah 11:10.

== Illyricum ==
In verse 19, Paul refers to the Roman province of Illyricum as the westernmost point of his missionary travels so far, Paul having "fully preached" the gospel from Jerusalem to this point. Illyricum stretched along the eastern coast of the Adriatic, and formed the northern boundary of Epirus and the north-western boundary of Macedonia. According to Acts 20:1–2, he "went away to go to Macedonia, and having passed through those parts [...] he came to Greece"; Anglican Bishop Charles Ellicott argues that "the vague expression which we find in Acts 20:2, When he had gone over those parts", affords ample room for the circuit in question.

"Fully preached" (πεπληρωκέναι, peplērōkenai) in relation to the gospel is generally understood to refer to the geographical reach of its preaching: the Jubilee Bible 2000 has "I have filled the entire area with the gospel of the Christ", and Moule suggests that "a fair paraphrase would thus be I have carried the Gospel everywhere".

== See also ==
- Achaia
- Illyricum
- Jerusalem
- Jesus Christ
- Judea
- Macedonia
- Spain
- Related Bible parts: Deuteronomy 32, 2 Samuel 22, Psalm 18, Psalm 69, Psalm 117, Isaiah 11, Isaiah 52, Matthew 5, Acts 20

== Bibliography ==
- Coogan, Michael David (2007). Coogan, Michael David; Brettler, Marc Zvi; Newsom, Carol Ann; Perkins, Pheme (eds.). The New Oxford Annotated Bible with the Apocryphal/Deuterocanonical Books: New Revised Standard Version, Issue 48 (Augmented 3rd ed.). Oxford University Press. ISBN 9780195288810.
- Hill, Craig C. (2007). "64. Romans". In Barton, John; Muddiman, John (eds.). The Oxford Bible Commentary (first (paperback) ed.). Oxford University Press. pp. 1083–1108. ISBN 978-0199277186.
- Kirkpatrick, A. F. (1901). The Book of Psalms: with Introduction and Notes. The Cambridge Bible for Schools and Colleges. Vol. Book IV and V: Psalms XC-CL. Cambridge: At the University Press.
