= Psalm 69 =

Biblical psalm

- "Save me, O God; for the waters are come in unto my soul."
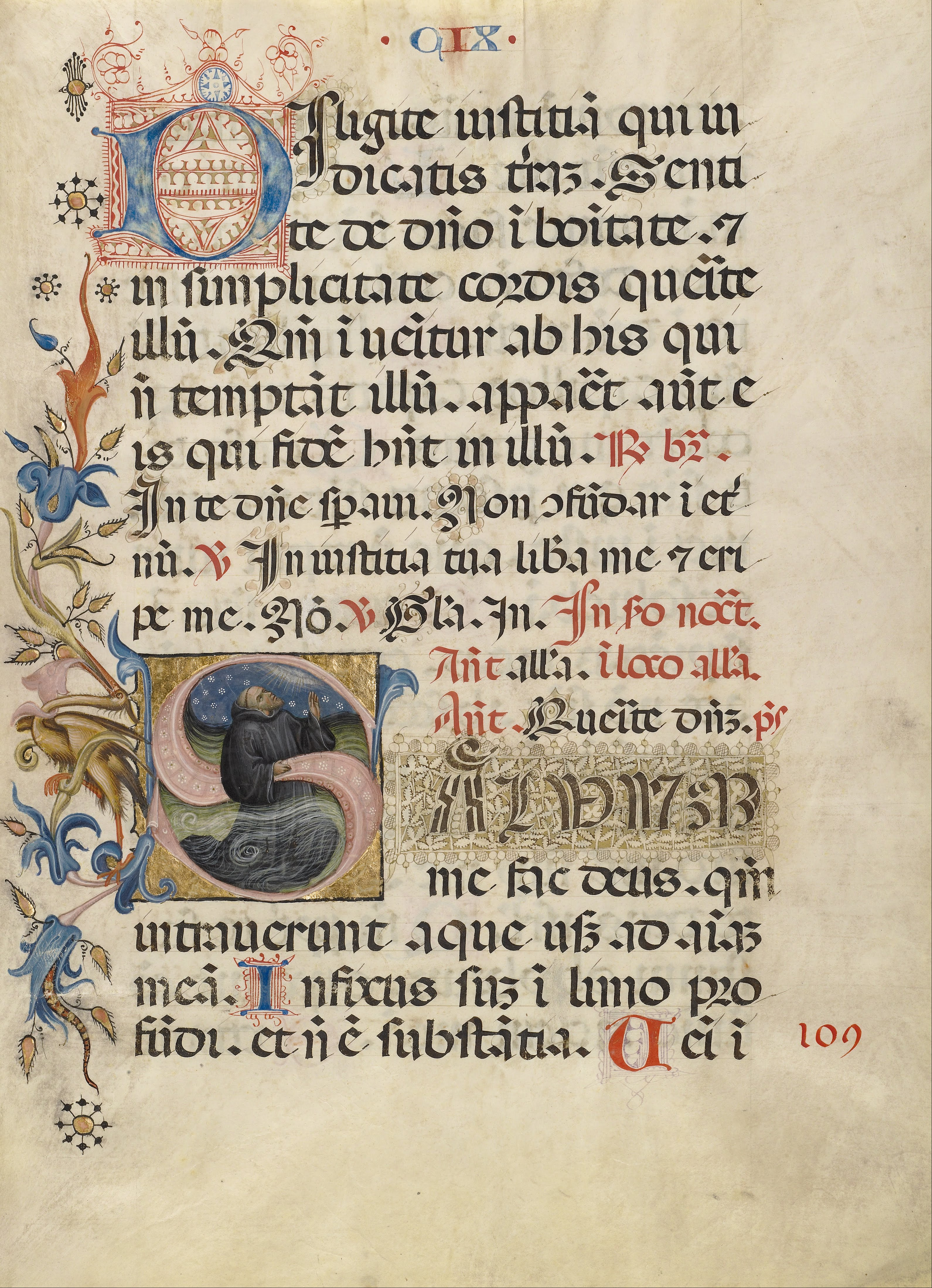
- A monk engulfed in water clings to the central curve of an initial 'S' of the first verse.
- Other name: Psalm 68 (Vulgate); "Salvum me fac Deus"
- Language: Hebrew (original)

Psalm 69
- ← Psalm 68 Psalm 70 →
- Book: Book of Psalms
- Hebrew Bible part: Ketuvim
- Order in the Hebrew part: 1
- Category: Sifrei Emet
- Christian Bible part: Old Testament
- Order in the Christian part: 19

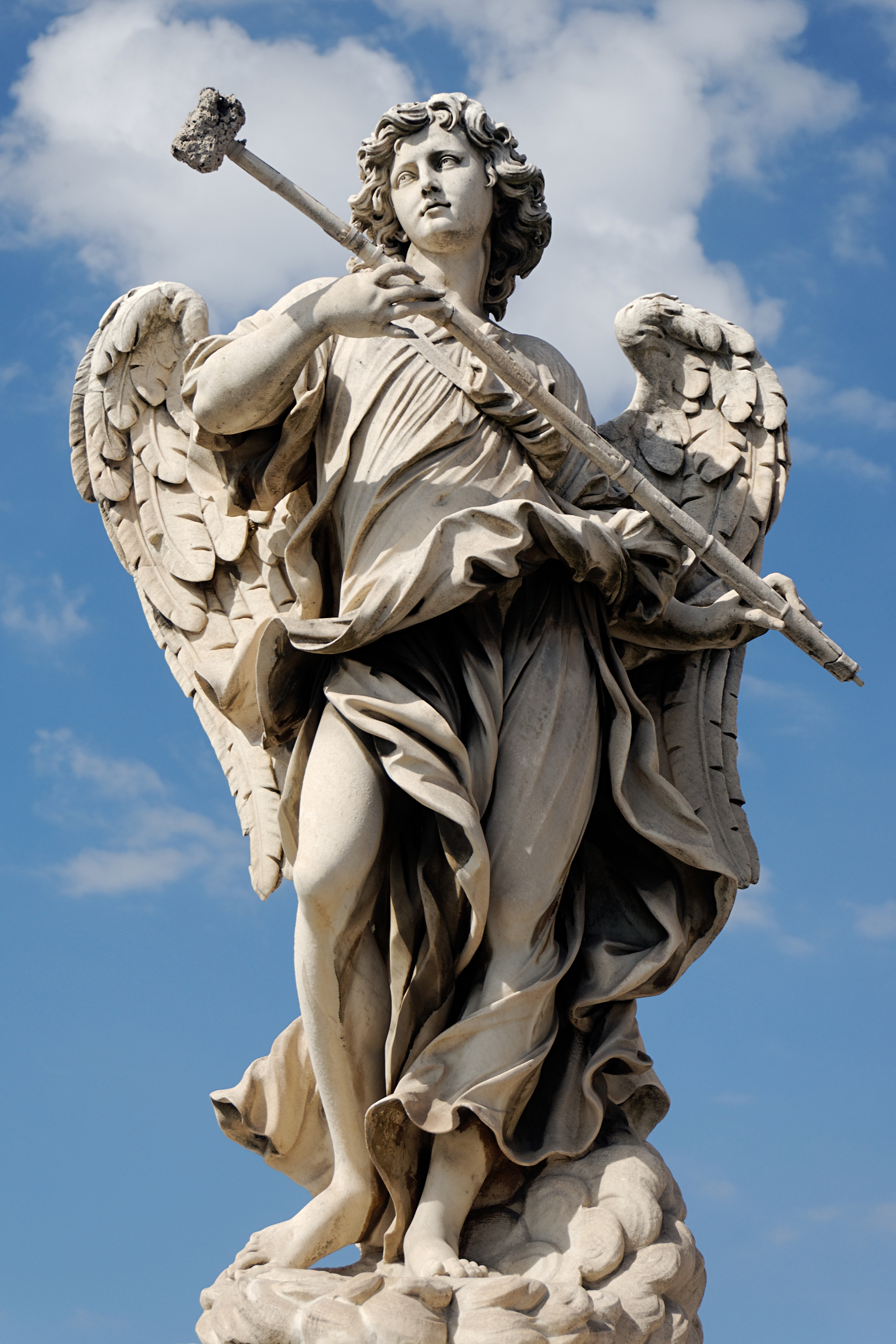
Angel Bearing a Sponge by Antonio Giorgetti, with the inscription "potaverunt me aceto" ("they gave me vinegar to drink", Psalm 69:22). It is located on the western side of the Ponte Sant'Angelo, in Rome.

Psalm 69 is the 69th psalm of the Book of Psalms, beginning in English in the King James Version: "Save me, O God; for the waters are come in unto my soul". It is subtitled: "To the chief musician, upon Shoshannim, a Psalm of David". The Book of Psalms is part of the third section of the Hebrew Bible, and a book of the Christian Old Testament. In the slightly different numbering system used in the Greek Septuagint version of the Bible and in the Latin Vulgate, this psalm is Psalm 68. In Latin, it is known as "Salvum me fac Deus". It has 36 verses (37 in Hebrew verse numbering).

Several verses from Psalm 69 are quoted in the New Testament. It forms a regular part of Jewish, Catholic, Lutheran, Anglican and other Protestant liturgies.

== Uses ==
=== New Testament ===
This psalm is quoted or referred to in several places in the New Testament:

- In John 2:17, when Jesus had expelled the money changers from the Temple, his disciples remembered the words of verse 9a: "zeal for Your house has eaten me up".
- In John 15:25, Jesus related his rejection by the Jews to fulfilment of the Jewish law: "This happened that the word might be fulfilled which is written in their law, 'They hated Me without a cause'." (Psalm 69:4 NKJV)
- Jesus was given gall or vinegar to drink when he was crucified (Matthew 27:34, 48); Mark 15:36; Luke 23:36; John 19:28–29), recalling Psalm 69:3 ("my throat is dry") and Psalm 69:21: "They also gave me gall for my food, and for my thirst they gave me vinegar to drink."
- In Acts 1:20, referring to the Field of Blood where Judas Iscariot committed suicide: "For it is written in the Book of Psalms: 'Let his dwelling place be desolate, and let no one live in it'". (Psalm 69:25 NKJV)
- Paul quotes verses 22–23 also quoting Psalm 109:8, in Romans 11:9–10: "Let their table become a snare and a trap, a stumbling block and a recompense to them. Let their eyes be darkened, so that they do not see, and bow down their back always."
- Paul quotes verse 9b in Romans 15:3: "Christ did not please Himself; but as it is written, 'The reproaches of those who reproached You fell on Me'."

=== Judaism ===
- Verse 7 is found in the repetition of the Mussaf Amidah on Rosh Hashanah:

"Because for Your sake I have borne reproach; shame has covered my face".

- Verse 14 is recited before the Torah service at Shabbat Minchah.
- Verses 14 and 32 are recited in the blessings before the Shema on the second day of Rosh Hashanah.

=== Eastern Orthodox Church ===
In the Eastern Orthodox Church, Psalm 68 (Psalm 69 in the Masoretic Text) is part of the ninth Kathisma division of the Psalter, read at the Midnight Office on Saturday mornings, at Vespers on Tuesday evenings, as well as on Mondays and Thursdays during Lent, at the Ninth Hour and the First Hour, respectively. It is also part of the Great Hours on Holy Friday.

=== Book of Common Prayer ===
In the Church of England's Book of Common Prayer, Psalm 69 is appointed to be read on the evening of the 13th day of the month, as well as at Evensong on Good Friday.

== Musical settings ==
Heinrich Schütz set Psalm 69 in a metred version in German, "Gott hilf mir, denn das Wasser dringt", SWV 166, as part of the Becker Psalter, first published in 1628.

The King James Version of verse 20 of Psalm 69 is cited as text in the English-language oratorio "Messiah" by George Frideric Handel (HWV 56).

=== Royal National Lifeboat Institution ===
Verse 15, "Let not the deep swallow me up", is inscribed on the reverse side of the gallantry medal issued by the Royal National Lifeboat Institution, the lifeboat service of the United Kingdom and Republic of Ireland.

== Text ==
The following table shows the Hebrew text of the Psalm with vowels, alongside the Koine Greek text in the Septuagint and the English translation from the King James Version. Note that the meaning can slightly differ between these versions, as the Septuagint and the Masoretic Text come from different textual traditions. (Note: A 1917 translation directly from Hebrew to English by the Jewish Publication Society can be found here or here, and an 1844 translation directly from the Septuagint by L. C. L. Brenton can be found here. Both translations are in the public domain.) In the Septuagint, this psalm is numbered Psalm 68.

#	Hebrew	English	Greek
(Note: In the Jewish verse numbering, the ascription of this psalm is verse 1, and the rest of the psalm begins from verse 2. However, the Christian verse numbering does not count the ascription.)	לַמְנַצֵּ֬חַ ׀ עַֽל־שׁוֹשַׁנִּ֬ים לְדָוִֽד׃	(To the chief Musician upon Shoshannim, A Psalm of David.)	Εἰς τὸ τέλος· ὑπὲρ τῶν ἀλλοιωθησομένων· τῷ Δαυΐδ. -
1	הוֹשִׁיעֵ֥נִי אֱלֹהִ֑ים כִּ֤י בָ֖אוּ מַ֣יִם עַד־נָֽפֶשׁ׃	Save me, O God; for the waters are come in unto my soul.	ΣΩΣΟΝ με, ὁ Θεός, ὅτι εἰσήλθοσαν ὕδατα ἕως ψυχῆς μου.
2	טָבַ֤עְתִּי ׀ בִּיוֵ֣ן מְ֭צוּלָה וְאֵ֣ין מׇעֳמָ֑ד בָּ֥אתִי בְמַעֲמַקֵּי־מַ֝֗יִם וְשִׁבֹּ֥לֶת שְׁטָפָֽתְנִי׃	I sink in deep mire, where there is no standing: I am come into deep waters, where the floods overflow me.	ἐνεπάγην εἰς ἰλὺν βυθοῦ, καὶ οὐκ ἔστιν ὑπόστασις· ἦλθον εἰς τὰ βάθη τῆς θαλάσσης καὶ καταιγὶς κατεπόντισέ με.
3	יָגַ֣עְתִּי בְקׇרְאִי֮ נִחַ֢ר גְּר֫וֹנִ֥י כָּל֥וּ עֵינַ֑י מְ֝יַחֵ֗ל לֵאלֹהָֽי׃	I am weary of my crying: my throat is dried: mine eyes fail while I wait for my God.	ἐκοπίασα κράζων, ἐβραγχίασεν ὁ λάρυγξ μου, ἐξέλιπον οἱ ὀφθαλμοί μου ἀπὸ τοῦ ἐλπίζειν με ἐπὶ τὸν Θεόν μου.
4	רַבּ֤וּ ׀ מִשַּׂעֲר֣וֹת רֹאשִׁי֮ שֹׂנְאַ֢י חִ֫נָּ֥ם עָצְמ֣וּ מַ֭צְמִיתַי אֹיְבַ֣י שֶׁ֑קֶר אֲשֶׁ֥ר לֹֽא־גָ֝זַ֗לְתִּי אָ֣ז אָשִֽׁיב׃	They that hate me without a cause are more than the hairs of mine head: they that would destroy me, being mine enemies wrongfully, are mighty: then I restored that which I took not away.	ἐπληθύνθησαν ὑπὲρ τὰς τρίχας τῆς κεφαλῆς μου οἱ μισοῦντές με δωρεάν, ἐκραταιώθησαν οἱ ἐχθροί μου οἱ ἐκδιώκοντές με ἀδίκως· ἃ οὐχ ἥρπαζον, τότε ἀπετίννυον.
5	אֱֽלֹהִ֗ים אַתָּ֣ה יָ֭דַעְתָּ לְאִוַּלְתִּ֑י וְ֝אַשְׁמוֹתַ֗י מִמְּךָ֥ לֹֽא־נִכְחָֽדוּ׃	O God, thou knowest my foolishness; and my sins are not hid from thee.	ὁ Θεός, σὺ ἔγνως τὴν ἀφροσύνην μου καὶ αἱ πλημμέλειαί μου ἀπὸ σοῦ οὐκ ἀπεκρύβησαν.
6	אַל־יֵ֘בֹ֤שׁוּ בִ֨י ׀ קֹוֶיךָ֮ אֲדֹנָ֥י יֱהֹוִ֗ה צְבָ֫א֥וֹת אַל־יִכָּ֣לְמֽוּ בִ֣י מְבַקְשֶׁ֑יךָ אֱ֝לֹהֵ֗י יִשְׂרָאֵֽל׃	Let not them that wait on thee, O Lord GOD of hosts, be ashamed for my sake: let not those that seek thee be confounded for my sake, O God of Israel.	μὴ αἰσχυνθείησαν ἐπ᾿ ἐμὲ οἱ ὑπομένοντές σε, Κύριε, Κύριε τῶν δυνάμεων, μὴ ἐντραπείησαν ἐπ᾿ ἐμὲ οἱ ζητοῦντές σε, ὁ Θεὸς τοῦ ᾿Ισραήλ,
7	כִּֽי־עָ֭לֶיךָ נָשָׂ֣אתִי חֶרְפָּ֑ה כִּסְּתָ֖ה כְלִמָּ֣ה פָנָֽי׃	Because for thy sake I have borne reproach; shame hath covered my face.	ὅτι ἕνεκά σου ὑπήνεγκα ὀνειδισμόν, ἐκάλυψεν ἐντροπὴ τὸ πρόσωπόν μου.
8	מ֭וּזָר הָיִ֣יתִי לְאֶחָ֑י וְ֝נׇכְרִ֗י לִבְנֵ֥י אִמִּֽי׃	I am become a stranger unto my brethren, and an alien unto my mother's children.	ἀπηλλοτριωμένος ἐγενήθην τοῖς ἀδελφοῖς μου καὶ ξένος τοῖς υἱοῖς τῆς μητρός μου,
9	כִּֽי־קִנְאַ֣ת בֵּיתְךָ֣ אֲכָלָ֑תְנִי וְחֶרְפּ֥וֹת ח֝וֹרְפֶ֗יךָ נָפְל֥וּ עָלָֽי׃	For the zeal of thine house hath eaten me up; and the reproaches of them that reproached thee are fallen upon me.	ὅτι ὁ ζῆλος τοῦ οἴκου σου κατέφαγέ με, καὶ οἱ ὀνειδισμοὶ τῶν ὀνειδιζόντων σε ἐπέπεσον ἐπ᾿ ἐμέ.
10	וָאֶבְכֶּ֣ה בַצּ֣וֹם נַפְשִׁ֑י וַתְּהִ֖י לַחֲרָפ֣וֹת לִֽי׃	When I wept, and chastened my soul with fasting, that was to my reproach.	καὶ συνεκάλυψα ἐν νηστείᾳ τὴν ψυχήν μου, καὶ ἐγενήθη εἰς ὀνειδισμοὺς ἐμοί·
11	וָאֶתְּנָ֣ה לְבוּשִׁ֣י שָׂ֑ק וָאֱהִ֖י לָהֶ֣ם לְמָשָֽׁל׃	I made sackcloth also my garment; and I became a proverb to them.	καὶ ἐθέμην τὸ ἔνδυμά μου σάκκον, καὶ ἐγενόμην αὐτοῖς εἰς παραβολήν.
12	יָשִׂ֣יחוּ בִ֭י יֹ֣שְׁבֵי שָׁ֑עַר וּ֝נְגִינ֗וֹת שׁוֹתֵ֥י שֵׁכָֽר׃	They that sit in the gate speak against me; and I was the song of the drunkards.	κατ᾿ ἐμοῦ ἠδολέσχουν οἱ καθήμενοι ἐν πύλαις, καὶ εἰς ἐμὲ ἔψαλλον οἱ πίνοντες οἶνον.
13	וַאֲנִ֤י תְפִלָּֽתִי־לְךָ֨ ׀ יְהֹוָ֡ה עֵ֤ת רָצ֗וֹן אֱלֹהִ֥ים בְּרׇב־חַסְדֶּ֑ךָ עֲ֝נֵ֗נִי בֶּאֱמֶ֥ת יִשְׁעֶֽךָ׃	But as for me, my prayer is unto thee, O LORD, in an acceptable time: O God, in the multitude of thy mercy hear me, in the truth of thy salvation.	ἐγὼ δὲ τῇ προσευχῇ μου πρὸς σέ, Κύριε· καιρὸς εὐδοκίας, ὁ Θεός, ἐν τῷ πλήθει τοῦ ἐλέους σου· ἐπάκουσόν μου, ἐν ἀληθείᾳ τῆς σωτηρίας σου.
14	הַצִּילֵ֣נִי מִ֭טִּיט וְאַל־אֶטְבָּ֑עָה אִנָּצְלָ֥ה מִ֝שֹּׂנְאַ֗י וּמִמַּ֖עֲמַקֵּי מָֽיִם׃	Deliver me out of the mire, and let me not sink: let me be delivered from them that hate me, and out of the deep waters.	σῶσόν με ἀπὸ πηλοῦ, ἵνα μὴ ἐμπαγῶ· ῥυσθείην ἐκ τῶν μισούντων με καὶ ἐκ τῶν βαθέων τῶν ὑδάτων.
15	אַל־תִּשְׁטְפֵ֤נִי ׀ שִׁבֹּ֣לֶת מַ֭יִם וְאַל־תִּבְלָעֵ֣נִי מְצוּלָ֑ה וְאַל־תֶּאְטַר־עָלַ֖י בְּאֵ֣ר פִּֽיהָ׃	Let not the waterflood overflow me, neither let the deep swallow me up, and let not the pit shut her mouth upon me.	μή με καταποντισάτω καταιγὶς ὕδατος, μηδὲ καταπιέτω με βυθός, μηδὲ συσχέτω ἐπ᾿ ἐμὲ φρέαρ τὸ στόμα αὐτοῦ.
16	עֲנֵ֣נִי יְ֭הֹוָה כִּי־ט֣וֹב חַסְדֶּ֑ךָ כְּרֹ֥ב רַ֝חֲמֶ֗יךָ פְּנֵ֣ה אֵלָֽי׃	Hear me, O LORD; for thy lovingkindness is good: turn unto me according to the multitude of thy tender mercies.	εἰσάκουσόν μου, Κύριε, ὅτι χρηστὸν τὸ ἔλεός σου· κατὰ τὸ πλῆθος τῶν οἰκτιρμῶν σου ἐπίβλεψον ἐπ᾿ ἐμέ.
17	וְאַל־תַּסְתֵּ֣ר פָּ֭נֶיךָ מֵעַבְדֶּ֑ךָ כִּי־צַר־לִ֝֗י מַהֵ֥ר עֲנֵֽנִי׃	And hide not thy face from thy servant; for I am in trouble: hear me speedily.	μὴ ἀποστρέψῃς τὸ πρόσωπόν σου ἀπὸ τοῦ παιδός σου, ὅτι θλίβομαι, ταχὺ ἐπάκουσόν μου.
18	קׇרְבָ֣ה אֶל־נַפְשִׁ֣י גְאָלָ֑הּ לְמַ֖עַן אֹיְבַ֣י פְּדֵֽנִי׃	Draw nigh unto my soul, and redeem it: deliver me because of mine enemies.	πρόσχες τῇ ψυχῇ μου καὶ λύτρωσαι αὐτήν, ἕνεκα τῶν ἐχθρῶν μου ῥῦσαί με.
19	אַתָּ֤ה יָדַ֗עְתָּ חֶרְפָּתִ֣י וּ֭בׇשְׁתִּי וּכְלִמָּתִ֑י נֶ֝גְדְּךָ֗ כׇּל־צוֹרְרָֽי׃	Thou hast known my reproach, and my shame, and my dishonour: mine adversaries are all before thee.	σὺ γὰρ γινώσκεις τὸν ὀνειδισμόν μου καὶ τὴν αἰσχύνην μου καὶ τὴν ἐντροπήν μου· ἐναντίον σου πάντες οἱ θλίβοντές με.
20	חֶרְפָּ֤ה ׀ שָׁ֥בְרָ֥ה לִבִּ֗י וָאָ֫נ֥וּשָׁה וָאֲקַוֶּ֣ה לָנ֣וּד וָאַ֑יִן וְ֝לַמְנַחֲמִ֗ים וְלֹ֣א מָצָֽאתִי׃	Reproach hath broken my heart; and I am full of heaviness: and I looked for some to take pity, but there was none; and for comforters, but I found none.	ὀνειδισμὸν προσεδόκησεν ἡ ψυχή μου καὶ ταλαιπωρίαν, καὶ ὑπέμεινα συλλυπούμενον, καὶ οὐχ ὑπῆρξε, καὶ παρακαλοῦντας, καὶ οὐχ εὗρον.
21	וַיִּתְּנ֣וּ בְּבָרוּתִ֣י רֹ֑אשׁ וְ֝לִצְמָאִ֗י יַשְׁק֥וּנִי חֹֽמֶץ׃	They gave me also gall for my meat; and in my thirst they gave me vinegar to drink.	καὶ ἔδωκαν εἰς τὸ βρῶμά μου χολὴν καὶ εἰς τὴν δίψαν μου ἐπότισάν με ὄξος.
22	יְהִי־שֻׁלְחָנָ֣ם לִפְנֵיהֶ֣ם לְפָ֑ח וְלִשְׁלוֹמִ֥ים לְמוֹקֵֽשׁ׃	Let their table become a snare before them: and that which should have been for their welfare, let it become a trap.	γενηθήτω ἡ τράπεζα αὐτῶν ἐνώπιον αὐτῶν εἰς παγίδα καὶ εἰς ἀνταπόδοσιν καὶ εἰς σκάνδαλον.
23	תֶּחְשַׁ֣כְנָה עֵ֭ינֵיהֶם מֵרְא֑וֹת וּ֝מׇתְנֵיהֶ֗ם תָּמִ֥יד הַמְעַֽד׃	Let their eyes be darkened, that they see not; and make their loins continually to shake.	σκοτισθήτωσαν οἱ ὀφθαλμοὶ αὐτῶν τοῦ μὴ βλέπειν, καὶ τὸν νῶτον αὐτῶν διαπαντὸς σύγκαμψον.
24	שְׁפׇךְ־עֲלֵיהֶ֥ם זַעְמֶ֑ךָ וַחֲר֥וֹן אַ֝פְּךָ֗ יַשִּׂיגֵֽם׃	Pour out thine indignation upon them, and let thy wrathful anger take hold of them.	ἔκχεον ἐπ᾿ αὐτοὺς τὴν ὀργήν σου, καὶ ὁ θυμὸς τῆς ὀργῆς σου καταλάβοι αὐτούς.
25	תְּהִי־טִירָתָ֥ם נְשַׁמָּ֑ה בְּ֝אׇהֳלֵיהֶ֗ם אַל־יְהִ֥י יֹשֵֽׁב׃	Let their habitation be desolate; and let none dwell in their tents.	γενηθήτω ἡ ἔπαυλις αὐτῶν ἠρημωμένη, καὶ ἐν τοῖς σκηνώμασιν αὐτῶν μὴ ἔστω ὁ κατοικῶν·
26	כִּי־אַתָּ֣ה אֲשֶׁר־הִכִּ֣יתָ רָדָ֑פוּ וְאֶל־מַכְא֖וֹב חֲלָלֶ֣יךָ יְסַפֵּֽרוּ׃	For they persecute him whom thou hast smitten; and they talk to the grief of those whom thou hast wounded.	ὅτι ὃν σὺ ἐπάταξας, αὐτοὶ κατεδίωξαν, καὶ ἐπὶ τὸ ἄλγος τῶν τραυμάτων μου προσέθηκαν.
27	תְּֽנָה־עָ֭וֺן עַל־עֲוֺנָ֑ם וְאַל־יָ֝בֹ֗אוּ בְּצִדְקָתֶֽךָ׃	Add iniquity unto their iniquity: and let them not come into thy righteousness.	πρόσθες ἀνομίαν ἐπὶ τῇ ἀνομίᾳ αὐτῶν, καὶ μὴ εἰσελθέτωσαν ἐν δικαιοσύνῃ σου·
28	יִ֭מָּחֽוּ מִסֵּ֣פֶר חַיִּ֑ים וְעִ֥ם צַ֝דִּיקִ֗ים אַל־יִכָּתֵֽבוּ׃	Let them be blotted out of the book of the living, and not be written with the righteous.	ἐξαλειφθήτωσαν ἐκ βίβλου ζώντων καὶ μετὰ δικαίων μὴ γραφήτωσαν.
29	וַ֭אֲנִי עָנִ֣י וְכוֹאֵ֑ב יְשׁוּעָתְךָ֖ אֱלֹהִ֣ים תְּשַׂגְּבֵֽנִי׃	But I am poor and sorrowful: let thy salvation, O God, set me up on high.	πτωχὸς καὶ ἀλγῶν εἰμι ἐγώ· ἡ σωτηρία σου, ὁ Θεός, ἀντιλάβοιτό μου.
30	אֲהַלְלָ֣ה שֵׁם־אֱלֹהִ֣ים בְּשִׁ֑יר וַאֲגַדְּלֶ֥נּוּ בְתוֹדָֽה׃	I will praise the name of God with a song, and will magnify him with thanksgiving.	αἰνέσω τὸ ὄνομα τοῦ Θεοῦ μου μετ᾿ ᾠδῆς, μεγαλυνῶ αὐτὸν ἐν αἰνέσει,
31	וְתִיטַ֣ב לַ֭יהֹוָה מִשּׁ֥וֹר פָּ֗ר מַקְרִ֥ן מַפְרִֽיס׃	This also shall please the LORD better than an ox or bullock that hath horns and hoofs.	καὶ ἀρέσει τῷ Θεῷ ὑπὲρ μόσχον νέον κέρατα ἐκφέροντα καὶ ὁπλάς.
32	רָא֣וּ עֲנָוִ֣ים יִשְׂמָ֑חוּ דֹּרְשֵׁ֥י אֱ֝לֹהִ֗ים וִיחִ֥י לְבַבְכֶֽם׃	The humble shall see this, and be glad: and your heart shall live that seek God.	ἰδέτωσαν πτωχοὶ καὶ εὐφρανθήτωσαν· ἐκζητήσατε τὸν Θεόν, καὶ ζήσεται ἡ ψυχὴ ὑμῶν,
33	כִּי־שֹׁמֵ֣עַ אֶל־אֶבְיוֹנִ֣ים יְהֹוָ֑ה וְאֶת־אֲ֝סִירָ֗יו לֹ֣א בָזָֽה׃	For the LORD heareth the poor, and despiseth not his prisoners.	ὅτι εἰσήκουσε τῶν πενήτων ὁ Κύριος καὶ τοὺς πεπεδημένους αὐτοῦ οὐκ ἐξουδένωσεν.
34	יְֽ֭הַלְלוּהוּ שָׁמַ֣יִם וָאָ֑רֶץ יַ֝מִּ֗ים וְֽכׇל־רֹמֵ֥שׂ בָּֽם׃	Let the heaven and earth praise him, the seas, and every thing that moveth therein.	αἰνεσάτωσαν αὐτὸν οἱ οὐρανοὶ καὶ ἡ γῆ, θάλασσα καὶ πάντα τὰ ἕρποντα ἐν αὐτῇ.
35	כִּ֤י אֱלֹהִ֨ים ׀ י֘וֹשִׁ֤יעַ צִיּ֗וֹן וְ֭יִבְנֶה עָרֵ֣י יְהוּדָ֑ה וְיָ֥שְׁבוּ שָׁ֝֗ם וִירֵשֽׁוּהָ׃	For God will save Zion, and will build the cities of Judah: that they may dwell there, and have it in possession.	ὅτι ὁ Θεὸς σώσει τὴν Σιών, καὶ οἰκοδομηθήσονται αἱ πόλεις τῆς ᾿Ιουδαίας, καὶ κατοικήσουσιν ἐκεῖ καὶ κληρονομήσουσιν αὐτήν·
36	וְזֶ֣רַע עֲ֭בָדָיו יִנְחָל֑וּהָ וְאֹהֲבֵ֥י שְׁ֝מ֗וֹ יִשְׁכְּנוּ־בָֽהּ׃	The seed also of his servants shall inherit it: and they that love his name shall dwell therein.	καὶ τὸ σπέρμα τῶν δούλων αὐτοῦ καθέξουσιν αὐτήν, καὶ οἱ ἀγαπῶντες τὸ ὄνομά σου κατασκηνώσουσιν ἐν αὐτῇ.

== See also ==
- Old Testament messianic prophecies quoted in the New Testament
