= The powers that be =

Phrase referring to those who hold authority

In idiomatic English, "the powers that be" is a phrase used to refer to those individuals or groups who collectively hold authority over a particular domain. Within this phrase, the word be is an archaic variant of are rather than a subjunctive be.

== Origin ==
The phrase first appeared in the Tyndale Bible, William Tyndale's 1526 translation of Romans Chapter 13 verse 1 in the New Testament, as: "Let every soul submit himself unto the authority of the higher powers. There is no power but of God. The powers that be, are ordained of God". In the 1611 King James Version it became, "Let every soul be subject unto the higher powers. For there is no power but of God: The powers that be are ordained of God." (Rom 13:1), whence it eventually passed into popular language.

The phrase comes from a translation of the Greek: αἱ ... οὖσαι [ἐξουσίαι], romanized: hai ... oûsai [exousíai], lit. 'the ... existing [powers]'; ἐξουσίαι is also translated as "authorities" in some other translations.

== Examples ==
"The powers that be" can refer to a variety of entities that depend on the domain, including

- Governments, both central and local, and the accompanying civil service
- The upper management of a business
- Those who control the dissemination of information
- Controlling bodies in any organization i.e. corporation or activity
- Secret societies and cabals

== See also ==
- Elite – Group or class of persons enjoying superior status
- Omnipotence – Property of possessing maximal power
- Romans 13
- Supreme deity – Only or paramount deity of a religion
- The Establishment – Dominant group that holds power
- Young Wizards#The Powers That Be – Novel series by Diane Duane
