= Romans 14 =

- ← chapter 13 chapter 15 →
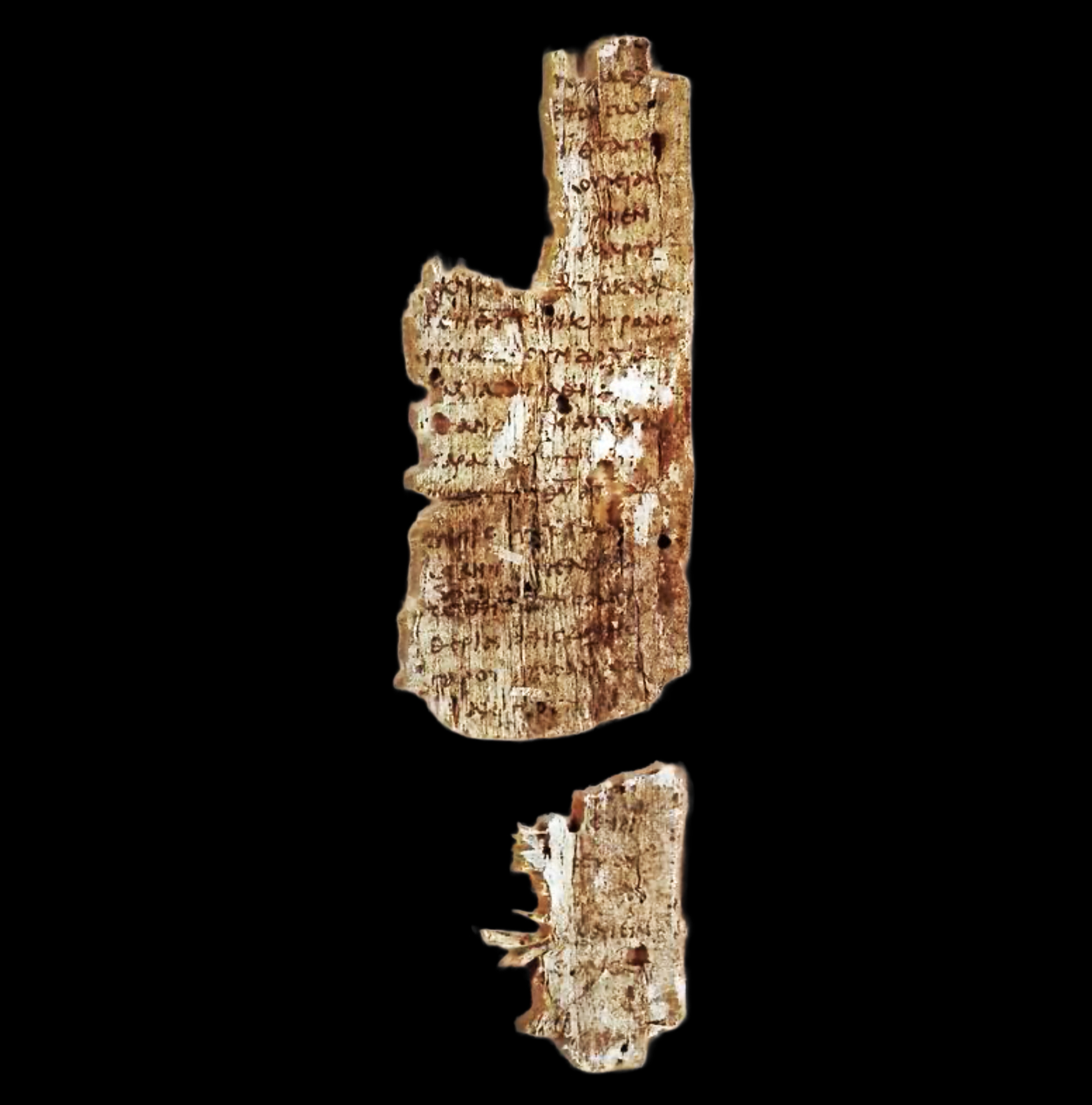
- Epistle to the Romans 8:12–27 in Papyrus 27 (recto side), written in the 3rd century
- Book: Epistle to the Romans
- Category: Pauline epistles
- Christian Bible part: New Testament
- Order in the Christian part: 6

Romans 14 is the fourteenth chapter of the Epistle to the Romans in the New Testament of the Christian Bible. It was authored by Paul the Apostle, while he was in Corinth in the mid-50s AD, with the help of an amanuensis (secretary), Tertius, who adds his own greeting in Romans 16:22.

Protestant Reformer Martin Luther summarised this chapter as Paul's teaching that "one should carefully guide those with weak conscience and spare them; one shouldn't use Christian freedom to harm, but rather to help, the weak", while Lutheran theologian Johann Albrecht Bengel says that Paul "refers all things to faith". Craig Hill suggests that Paul has drawn on his "recent Corinthian correspondence" in this part of the epistle.

== Text ==
The original text was written in Koine Greek. This chapter is divided into 23 verses in most modern-day translations, but many historic Greek editions placed Romans 16:25–27 at the end of this chapter instead, making it consist of 26 verses in total.

=== Textual witnesses ===
Some early manuscripts containing the text of this chapter are:

- In Greek:
  - Codex Vaticanus (AD 325–350)
  - Codex Sinaiticus (330–360)
  - Codex Alexandrinus (400–440)
  - Codex Ephraemi Rescriptus (~450; complete)
- In Gothic language
  - Codex Carolinus (6th/7th century; extant verses 9–20)
- In Latin
  - Codex Carolinus (6th/7th century; extant verses 9–20)

=== Old Testament references ===
- Romans 14:11 refers to Isaiah 45:23

=== New Testament references ===
- Romans 14:10 references 2 Corinthians 5:10
- Romans 14:15 references 1 Corinthians 8:11
- Romans 14:20 references Titus 1:15
- Romans 14:21 references 1 Corinthians 8:13

== The weak in faith ==
The identity of the "weak" is not clear. The word which Paul uses for "weakness" in faith (τον [...] ἀσθενοῦντα τῇ πίστει, ton asthenounta tē pistei) refers to both physical illness and moral weakness. In 2 Timothy 4:20, a book traditionally ascribed to Paul, it is stated that Paul's missionary companion Trophimus was sick (ἀσθενοῦντα, asthenounta) when he left him at Miletus.

=== Verse 4 ===
Who are you to judge another's servant? To his own master he stands or falls. Indeed, he will be made to stand, for God is able to make him stand.

— Romans 14:4, New King James Version

Hill suggests that verse 4 is reminiscent of the teaching of Jesus Christ in a verse which he calls "that most-cited biblical quotation", Matthew 7:1: "Judge not, lest you be judged."

== Verse 23 ==
But he who doubts is condemned if he eats, because he does not eat from faith; for whatever is not from faith is sin.

— Romans 14:23, New King James Version

The statement about faith in verse 23 is similar to that found in Hebrews 11:6, "...without faith it is impossible to please God".

== Verses 24–26 ==
^{24}Now to him who is able to establish you according to my Good News and the preaching of Jesus Christ, according to the revelation of the mystery which has been kept secret through long ages, ^{25}but now is revealed, and by the Scriptures of the prophets, according to the commandment of the eternal God, is made known for obedience of faith to all the nations; ^{26}to the only wise God, through Jesus Christ, to whom be the glory forever! Amen.

— Romans 14:24–26, World English Bible

Verses 24–26 are not contained here in most modern-day English translations, but rather they are placed at the end of Romans 16 as verses 25–27. However, the majority of Greek manuscripts, most of which are in the Byzantine Text tradition, place these verses here at the end of Romans 14. A very small minority of other manuscripts either place them after Romans 15, place them in multiple places, or omit them altogether. Most scholars today believe that these verses belong at the end of chapter 16, but some defend the authenticity of their placement at this location.

== See also ==
- Unclean animals
- Related Bible parts: Isaiah 45, Isaiah 49, Matthew 7

== Bibliography ==
- Coogan, Michael David (2007). Coogan, Michael David; Brettler, Marc Zvi; Newsom, Carol Ann; Perkins, Pheme (eds.). The New Oxford Annotated Bible with the Apocryphal/Deuterocanonical Books: New Revised Standard Version, Issue 48 (Augmented 3rd ed.). Oxford University Press. ISBN 9780195288810.
- Hill, Craig C. (2007). "64. Romans". In Barton, John; Muddiman, John (eds.). The Oxford Bible Commentary (first (paperback) ed.). Oxford University Press. pp. 1083–1108. ISBN 978-0199277186.
