= Romans 16 =

- ← chapter 15 1 Corinthians 1 →
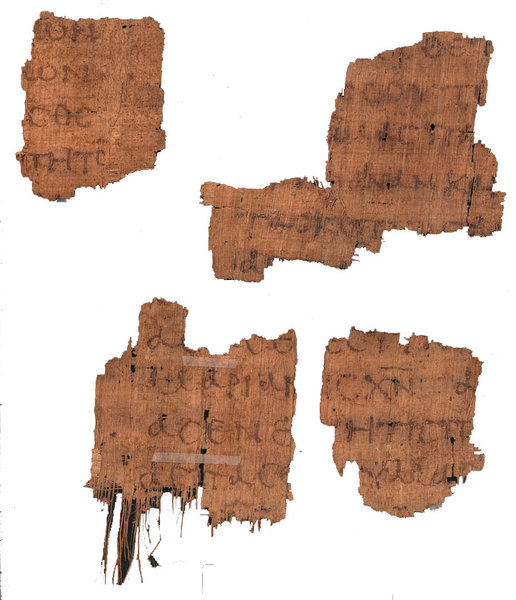
- Epistle to the Romans 16:1,4–7, 11–12 in Papyrus 118 (verso side), written in the 3rd century
- Book: Epistle to the Romans
- Category: Pauline epistles
- Christian Bible part: New Testament
- Order in the Christian part: 6

Romans 16 is the sixteenth and final chapter of the Epistle to the Romans in the New Testament of the Christian Bible. It was authored by Paul the Apostle, while Paul was in Corinth in the mid-50s AD, with the help of a secretary (amanuensis), Tertius, who adds his own greeting in verse 22.

While this chapter contains Paul's personal recommendation, personal greetings, final admonition, grace, greetings from companions, identification of its writer/amanuensis and a blessing, Martin Luther notes that it

also includes a salutary warning against human doctrines which are preached alongside the Gospel and which do a great deal of harm. It's as though he had clearly seen that out of Rome and through the Romans would come the deceitful, harmful Canons and Decretals along with the entire brood and swarm of human laws and commands that is now drowning the whole world and has blotted out this letter and the whole of the Scriptures, along with the Spirit and faith. Nothing remains but the idol Belly, and St. Paul depicts those people here as its servants. God deliver us from them. Amen.

== Text ==
This chapter is divided into 27 verses. The original text was written in Koine Greek: some early manuscripts containing the text of this chapter are:

- Papyrus 46 (175-225; complete with minor lacunae at bottom of leaves)
- Papyrus 118 (3rd century; extant verses 1, 4–7, 11–12)
- Codex Vaticanus (325–350)
- Codex Sinaiticus (330–360)
- Codex Alexandrinus (400–440)
- Codex Ephraemi Rescriptus (~450; complete)
- Papyrus 61 (7th century; extant verses 23–27)

== Phoebe (verses 1–2) ==
^{1}I commend to you our sister Phoebe, who is a servant of the church at Cenchrea, ^{2}that you welcome her in the Lord in a manner worthy of the saints, and that you assist her in whatever matter she may have need of you, for she has been a helper of many and of myself as well.

— Romans 16:1–2, Modern English Version

"Phoebe" is described as a "servant" (διακονον, diakonon) of the church in the New King James Version, as a "deacon" in the New International Version and the New Revised Standard Version, a "deaconess" in the Revised Standard Version and the Jerusalem Bible, and a "leader" in the Contemporary English Version. According to the contemporary idiom in The Message, she was "a key representative of the church at Cenchreae" (or Cenchrea). The Jerusalem Bible suggests she was "probably the bearer of the letter" and verse 2 suggests she also had other "business" to deal with in Rome.

== Priscilla and Aquila (verses 3–4) ==
^{3}Greet Priscilla and Aquila, my fellow workers in Christ Jesus, ^{4}who risked their own necks for my life, to whom not only I give thanks, but also all the churches of the Gentiles.

— Romans 16:3–4, New King James Version

"Priscilla" is a diminutive and affectionate name for 'Prisca'. She and her husband, Aquila, were expelled from Rome as Jews under Claudius, and had been converted at Corinth by Paul (Acts 18:1). Priscilla was remarkably mentioned first, perhaps inferring that she was "the more active and conspicuous of the two" as also in Acts 18:18 and 2 Timothy 4:19; except in 1 Corinthians 16:19, where they send greetings, her husband takes precedence.

Afterwards this married couple appear in Paul's company at Ephesus (Acts 18:18; Acts 18:26; 1 Corinthians 16:19). When this Epistle was written they were at Rome, but later they seem to have returned to Ephesus (2 Timothy 4:19).

"Aquila" was a Jew of Pontus. There is another Jew named Aquila from Pontus (Sinope), living more than a century later, who made a translation of the Hebrew Bible (Old Testament) into Greek, critically compared with the Septuagint in the Hexapla of Origen.

== Andronicus and Junia (verse 7) ==
Salute Andronicus and Junia, my kinsmen, and my fellow-prisoners, who are of note among the apostles, who also were in Christ before me.

— Romans 16:7, King James Version

- "Andronicus" was a kinsman of Paul and a fellow prisoner at some time, particularly well known among the apostles, who had become a follower of Jesus Christ before Paul's conversion on the road to Damascus, and whom Paul commended together with Junia as being remarkable Christian workers and "apostles" alongside Silas, Timothy, and others given that title in the early Church.
- "Junia": Despite the existence of a view in the past that this was a man named Junias (Ἰουνιᾶς or Ἰουνίας, the latter being the Hebrew name Yĕḥunnī), the consensus among most modern New Testament scholars is that this person was a woman named Junia (Ἰουνία), whom Paul the Apostle may have considered as an apostle. Craig Hill states that no example has been found for the masculine form 'Junias', while the feminine form of 'Junia' is "very well attested", so the rendering to 'Junias' in some Bible versions is a "scandalous mistranslation".

== Tertius (verse 22) ==
I Tertius, who wrote this epistle, salute you in the Lord.

— Romans 16:22, King James Version

"Tertius" was an amanuensis of the apostle, who wrote this letter, either from the apostle's notes, or from dictation. His name is a Latin one, and perhaps the person might be a Roman, for the names Secundus, Tertius, Quartus, Quintus, etc. were common with the Romans, although it could be argued that this man was the same with Silas, which Hebrew word is the same as Tertius. Silas is known as a companion of apostle Paul, also is numbered among the seventy disciples, and said to be bishop of Iconium (see Luke 10:1). The phrase "in the Lord" could be connected with "wrote this epistle" and make the sense that Tertius wrote this epistle for the Lord's sake (not by inspiration, but being only scribe to the apostle). However, that phrase is better connected with the word "salute" and the sense is that his salutation was meant to wish the people well in the Lord, so that "they might have much communion with him".

== Gaius, Erastus and Quartus (verse 23) ==
Gaius, my host and the host of the whole church, greets you. Erastus, the treasurer of the city, greets you, and Quartus, a brother.

— Romans 16:23, New King James Version

- "Erastus" (Greek: Ἔραστος, Erastos): also known as "Erastus of Paneas", was a steward (οἰκονόμος, oikonomos) in Corinth, a political office of high civic status. The word is defined as "the manager of household or of household affairs" or, in this context, "treasurer"; the King James Version uses the translation "chamberlain", while the New International Version uses "director of public works". An inscription mentioning an Erastus was found in 1929 near a paved area northeast of the theater of Corinth, dated to the mid-first century and reads "Erastus in return for his aedileship paved it at his own expense." Some New Testament scholars have identified this aedile Erastus with the Erastus mentioned in the Epistle to the Romans but this is disputed by others.
- "Quartus": the description "a brother" is interpreted by most scholars as "a fellow believer", rather than 'a brother of Erastus'. According to church tradition, he is known as "Quartus of Berytus", a bishop of Beirut (around AD 50) and one of the seventy disciples.

== Doxology (verse 27) ==
To God only wise, be glory through Jesus Christ for ever. Amen.

— Romans 16:27, King James Version

Paul's doxology in the conclusion of the epistle, aside from effectively summing up some of the key themes, gives a high note of ascription of glory to "the only wise God".

== Controversy ==
There are many scholars who argue that the original letter ended with Romans 14:23 because they believe that this doxology (along with much of chapters 15 and 16) were added later to summarize the contents of the letter and to provide a less abrupt ending. Some have said that the end of the original is in chapter 15. There are Romans manuscripts which end in chapter 15 and other manuscripts place chapter 16 between chapters 14 and 15.

=== Verse 24 ===
Many translations exclude this verse altogether, skipping from verse 23 to verse 25, because most of the older manuscripts, discovered some time after chapter and verse numbers were applied to Romans, do not have them, it is generally omitted from the final translation. Protestants usually omit verse 16:24 but the Anglican Church accepts it as canonical.

Arland J. Hultgren said:

They are missing altogether in some Greek witnesses; alternatively, they appear at the end of chapter 14 in some Greek texts; and they appear after chapter 15 in others. (There are even more variations than these!) So many textual variations makes these verses highly suspect, causing one to question whether they were part of the version that came from the hand of Tertius, Paul’s amanuensis (Romans 16:22).

== See also ==
- Cenchrea
- Herodion of Patras
- Rufus
- Related Bible parts: Mark 15, Acts 18

== Sources ==
- Coogan, Michael David (2007). Coogan, Michael David; Brettler, Marc Zvi; Newsom, Carol Ann; Perkins, Pheme (eds.). The New Oxford Annotated Bible with the Apocryphal/Deuterocanonical Books: New Revised Standard Version, Issue 48 (Augmented 3rd ed.). Oxford University Press. ISBN 9780195288810.
- Hill, Craig C. (2007). "64. Romans". In Barton, John; Muddiman, John (eds.). The Oxford Bible Commentary (first (paperback) ed.). Oxford University Press. pp. 1083–1108. ISBN 978-0199277186.
- Moo, Douglas J. (1994). "Romans". In Carson, D. A.; France, R. T.; Motyer, J. A.; Wenham, G. J. (eds.). New Bible Commentary: 21st Century Edition (4, illustrated, reprint, revised ed.). Inter-Varsity Press. pp. 1115–1160. ISBN 9780851106489.
