= The Queen stands at your right hand =

Religious icon

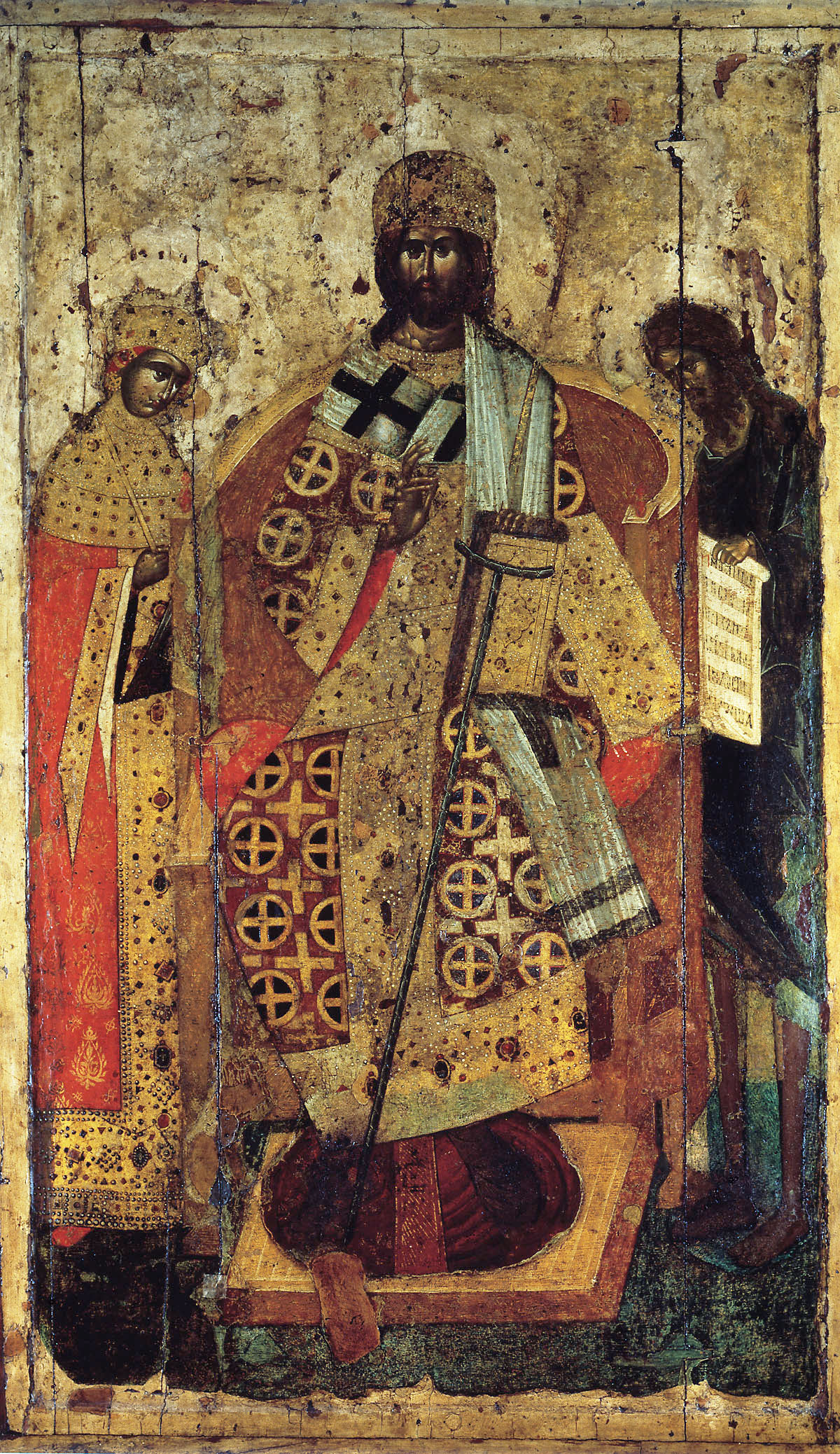
The Queen stands at your right hand, 14th century, Dormition Cathedral, Moscow

The Queen stands at your right hand (Russian: Предста Царица одесную Тебе; also called the déisis real) is a deisis type icon. It represents Jesus Christ sitting on his throne, adding details such as the “Tsar of Tsars” or the “High Priest” with, at his side, Mary dressed as a queen and John the Baptist.

Among the destroyed frescoes, of which photographs are preserved from the Church of the Transfiguration (the Savior of Kovalev), in Novgorod, there was a representation of the same type with the Theotokos and Christ only, but without John the Baptist.

== Sources ==
- (ru) Ostachenko E., On the iconography "The Queen Stands at Your Right"; Attribution problems, Осташенко Е. Я. Об иконографическом типе иконы «Предста Царица» Успенского собора Московского Кремля // Древнерусское искусство. Проблемы и атрибуции [т. 10]. — М.: Наука, 1977. — С. 175—187.
- (ru) The icons of the Cathedral of the Dormition in Moscow/ Иконы Успенского собора Московского Кремля. XI — начало XV века. Каталог. — М.: Северный паломник, 2007. — Кат. No. 11, стр. 128—133.
- (ru) In the Orthodox Encyclopedia /Деисус [archive] // Православная энциклопедия. Т. 14
