= Criticism of democracy =

Critiques of democratic political systems

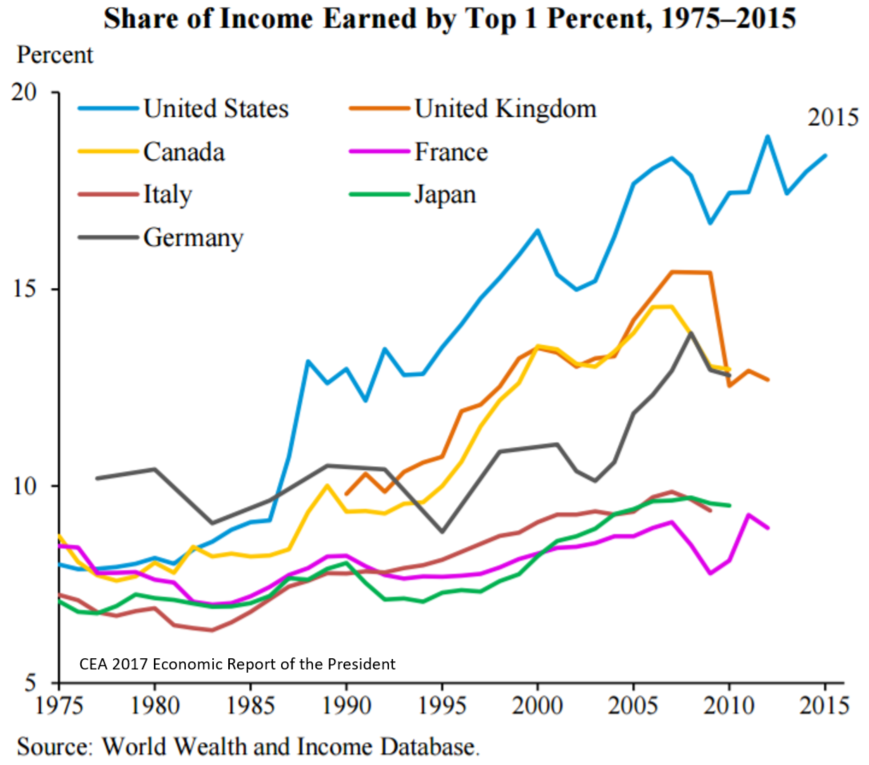
International share of income earned by the top 1% of earners from 1975 to 2015. Critics of democracy often cite institutional failure to address economic inequality.

Democracy as a concept and as a practical implementation has been the subject of critique throughout history. Some critics consider that democratic regimes often fail to be true to the highest principles expected of them, while others criticize the values promoted by constitutional democracy in whole or part.

Opposition to democracy goes as far back as Plato, who argued for a 'government of the best qualified'. More recently, James Madison extensively studied historic attempts at and arguments on democracy in his preparation for the Constitutional Convention, and Winston Churchill remarked that "no one pretends that democracy is perfect or all-wise. Indeed, it has been said that democracy is the worst form of Government except all those other forms that have been tried from time to time".

Critics argue that modern democracies may fail to be sufficiently democratic, and instead function in practice as oligarchies, insofar as governments are more responsive to the preferences of economic elites than to those of ordinary citizens. Others have characterized democracies to some extent as democratic aristocracies. Some critics of democracy have highlighted inconsistencies including low voter turnout, censorship, political polarization, and politicians picking voters through gerrymandering or naturalization.

== Historical criticism ==
=== Classical philosophy ===
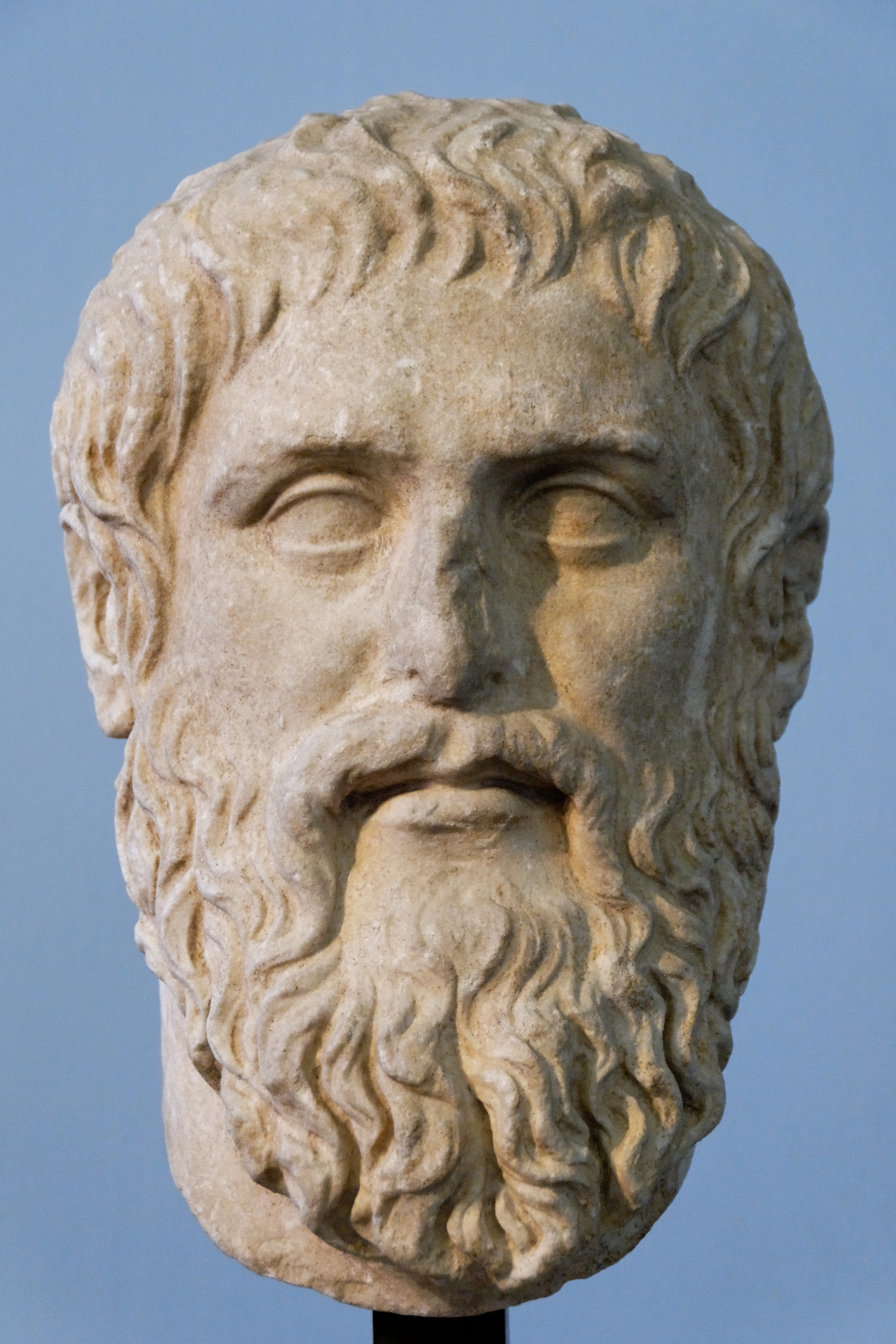
Plato is considered one of the most important opponents of democratic rule in Ancient Greece.

Our understanding of classical theories of democracy depend heavily on the work of critics. For example, Robert Dahl has written, "Although the practices of modern democracy bear only a weak resemblance to the political institutions of classical Greece ... Greek democratic ideas have been more influential ... [and] what we know of their ideas comes less from the writings and speeches of democratic advocates, of which only fragments survive, than from their critics." Amongst those critics, Aristotle, Plato and Thucydides are notable.

Aristotle was a mild critic of democracy. The essence of his critique was that he "disliked the power that he thought the expansion of democracy necessarily gave to the poor." Plato was also skeptical of the broad scope of democracy: he advocated for "government by the best qualified." Early liberal democracy paid attention to these critiques. For example, James Madison "trained rigorously in ... ancient learning" as a young man, and the ideas of ancient authors explain a "facet of Madison's recorded attitude on the nature of man." The influence of ancient critiques of democracy can be seen in the way Madison spent the months before the Constitutional Convention "studying many centuries of political philosophy and histories of past attempts at republican forms of government."

According to Dahl, Aristotle and Plato would agree with most advocates of modern democracy that an aim of the society is "to produce good citizens", and that "Virtue, justice, and happiness are companions ... [in] developing citizens who seek the common good."

Thucydides, the famous Greek historian of the Peloponnesian War, witnessed the fall of Athenian democracy and applied scientific history in his critique of the democratic government. At the heart of his critique was an assertion that democracy failed "in the search for truth" and that leaders and citizens attempted "to impose their own speech-dependent meanings on reality." Thucydides blamed "public orators" and demagogues for a failure of epistemic knowledge, allowing most Athenians to "believe silly things about their past and the institutions of their opponents."

=== Post-classical era criticism ===
Italian philosopher and theologian Thomas Aquinas favored "a mixed government combining elements of democracy, aristocracy and kingship ... [which] is reminiscent of Aristotle's preference for mixed government over either democracy or oligarchy." Scholars also consider "the substantial medieval literature in support of the Inquisitions" to be opposed to modern ideas of democracy.

Democracy existed in a few "city-states of medieval Italy ... [which] were ultimately submerged in imperial or oligarchic rule." The idea of "representation was not invented by democrats but developed instead as a medieval institution of monarchical and aristocratic government," and had its beginnings in "assemblies summoned by the monarch, or sometimes the nobles themselves, to deal with important matters of state." The "state of military technology and organization" in medieval Europe was "highly unfavorable in its effects" on democracy.

Medieval Jewish political philosophy, being influenced by Plato, Muslim thought and Halakhic concepts, was "monarchist, and inherently anti-democratic."

Traditional Asian societies were regarded as anti-democratic, but Amartya Sen has pointed out that "It is not hard, of course, to find authoritarian writings within the Asian traditions. But neither is it hard to find them in Western classics: One has only to reflect on the writings of Plato or Aquinas to see that devotion to discipline is not a special Asian taste."

Since the post-classical period, Islam has been an important pillar of society for much of the world, and some critics have defended this tradition from "the secular assumptions of the Enlightenment" and an "uncritical universalism" that "erodes historical continuity and the sense of community that sustains traditional societies." In many societies today, people of faith challenge the idea of "secularism as the only 'rational' way to deal with the challenges of life."

=== Early modern criticism ===
Thomas Hobbes, one of the first philosophers of the Enlightenment, published Leviathan in 1651 in defense of "absolute sovereignty" and in support of the royalist side in the English Civil War. Hobbes was a critic of democracy because "the sovereign in a democracy (i.e. the people) can only exercise its power when it is actually assembled together ... Only in a monarchy is the capacity to govern always exercised." Hobbes also considered that democracy would undermine the social contract because it leads to instability, conflict, glory-seeking, and mistrust. Later Enlightenment thinkers, such as Madison, who shared Hobbesian concerns about "the strongest passions and most dangerous weaknesses" of human nature, would use some of these critiques to improve modern democracy.

=== Romantic era criticism ===
Romantic critics of democracy include Thomas Carlyle, John Ruskin, Matthew Arnold, James Fitzjames Stephen, Henry Maine, and William Lecky. In his study, Benjamin Evans Lippincott wrote that "they opposed democracy fundamentally for the same reason as Plato—that democracy led to disorder." However, their historical contribution was to critique democracy under capitalism in modern industrial society. They believed that democracy produced anarchy in society, not simply anarchy within the individual as Plato believed.

Lippincott argued that this group held three fundamental doctrines: "the common man's inferiority, the title of the few to rule, and authority." They found sources for these principles in Puritanism, middle-class ideas of power, and the classical education that they had received in their youth. The three doctrines were "most perfectly represented in Plato's Republic," while classical history seemed to provide examples of "the common man's inferiority" as in the cases of Athens and Rome, "which showed the populace turning to disorder." The three doctrines had been developed during the Reformation and the Enlightenment by writers like John Calvin, Edmund Burke and David Hume.

== Political and philosophical criticism ==
=== Competence of the electorate ===
Plato's view was that the ability of common men to vote was one of democracy's key failings. This aspect of democracy means that the vote of an expert has equal value to the vote of 'an incompetent'. Jason Brennan believes that low information voters are a significant problem in America, and that this is the main objection to democracies in general because the system does not incentivize being or becoming better informed. He cites a study in which it was found that less than 30% of Americans could name two or more of the rights listed in the Bill of Rights. He argues that this lack of competence within the electorate inhibits democracy's ability to function as intended, as each individual does not have equal opportunity to advance their interests, because they are not informed as to how do so. He believes an informed voter should have extensive knowledge of the candidate's current and previous political beliefs/tendencies. He concludes that an epistocracy, which would only give a vote to those with an elite political understanding, would be better than a broad democracy. The reason that Brennan argues in favour of epistocracy, rather than an increase in political education, is that the way in which voters process information is too affected by cognitive biases for this to improve political competence. Instead, he argues that gaining more political knowledge only strengthens voters' existing views, rather than encouraging them to reflect and consider other points of view.

Economist Bryan Caplan argues in The Myth of the Rational Voter, that voters are not merely ignorant, but often "rationally irrational": systemically biased in their economic beliefs because the personal cost of error is negligible in large electorates. This leads democracies to favor interventionist policies that reduce overall welfare and individual economic freedom.

Charles Maurras, a supporter of the Vichy regime and principal philosopher of the right-wing Action Française movement, believed in biological inequality and natural hierarchies. He argued that the individual is naturally subordinate to collectivities such as the family, society, and the state, and so those are doomed to fail if they are founded on the "myth of equality" or "abstract liberty". Maurras criticized democracy as being a "government by numbers" in which quantity matters more than quality, and the worst is favored over the best. Maurras denounced the principles of liberalism as described in The Social Contract by Jean-Jacques Rousseau and in the Declaration of the Rights of Man and of the Citizen as based upon the false assumptions of liberty and equality. He claimed that the parliamentary system subordinates the national interest, or common good, to private interests of a parliament's representatives where only short-sighted interests of individuals prevail. Other studies have found that attempts, such as those proposed by Maurras, to replace democratic meritocracy with authoritarian meritocracy face challenges since power can override merit.

In his criticism of Western liberal democracy, academic Zhang Weiwei argues that liberal democracy is insufficiently meritocratic and fails to choose trustworthy leaders.

=== Majoritarianism ===
Plato, James Madison and other democratic theorists criticize the majority rule due to situations in which a majority could become tyrannical, also called the tyranny of the majority. Richard Ellis and Michael Nelson have argued that much constitutional thought, from Madison to Lincoln and beyond, has focused on "the problem of majority tyranny". They conclude, "The principles of republican government embedded in the Constitution represent an effort by the framers to ensure that the inalienable rights of life, liberty, and the pursuit of happiness would not be trampled by majorities." Thomas Jefferson warned that "an elective despotism is not the government we fought for." A constitution limits what a simple majority can accomplish since changes to a constitution frequently require a supermajority.

Alexis de Tocqueville, in Democracy in America, extended these concerns beyond formal lawmaking. He warned that majority rule could produce a subtler 'soft despotism', a centralized, administrative power that provides for citizens' material needs while gradually eroding their independence, self-reliance, and capacity for individual liberty through pervasive social conformity and regulatory tutelage.

Another safeguard against the tyranny of majority are principles of liberalism through rights of the individual, liberty, consent of the governed, political equality, right to private property, political egalitarianism and equality before the law and other civil and political rights and human rights. Cases where the majority opinion conflicts with some interpretations of liberal principles, for example on immigration, have been described as a democratic dilemma.

The Chinese Communist Party's political concept of whole-process people's democracy criticizes liberal democracy for relying excessively on procedural formalities or rule of law without, in the party's view, genuinely reflecting the interests of the people. According to Wang Zhongyuan of Fudan University, this critique arises as part of a post-1990s trend in which various countries have sought to redefine "democracy" in ways that differ from Western multi-party democratic systems. Under the framing of whole-process people's democracy, the most important criterion for democracy is whether it can "solve the people's real problems," while a system in which "the people are awakened only for voting" is deemed not truly democratic. The concept can thus be used as a way of criticizing liberal democracy and to deflect criticism of the Chinese system.

=== Elitism ===
"The consciousness of power always produces vanity, an undue belief in personal greatness. The desire to dominate, for good or for evil, is universal. These are elementary facts. In the leader, the consciousness of his personal worth, and of the need which the mass feels for guidance, combine to induce in his mind a recognition of his own superiority (real or supposed), and awake, in addition, that spirit of command which exists in the germ in every man born of woman....He who has acquired power will almost always endeavor to consolidate it and to extend it, to multiply the ramparts which defend his position, and to withdraw himself from the control of the masses."

— Robert Michels, Political Parties, 1911

Bernard Manin draws on James Harrington, Montesquieu, and Jean-Jacques Rousseau to suggest that the dominant form of government—representative rather than direct democracy—is effectively aristocratic. He says that modern representative governments exercise political power through aristocratic elections which, in turn, countermands the "rule of the people". Montesquieu argued that elections favor the "best" citizens who, as Manin notes, tend to be wealthy and upper-class. For Rousseau, elections favor incumbent government officials or those citizens with the strongest personalities, which results in a form of hereditary aristocracy. Manin further evinces the aristocratic nature of representative governments by contrasting them with the ancient style of selection by lot. He notes that Montesquieu considered lotteries to prevent jealousy and distribute offices equally (among citizens from different ranks), while Rousseau believed that lotteries chose indifferently, preventing self-interest and partiality from tainting the citizen's choice (and thereby preventing hereditary aristocracy).

Manin looks at the gap between the American and French revolutionaries' claim of "equality of all citizens" in the 18th century and their decision to use elections that often favored elites instead of lotteries in their democratic systems. He explains this by noting that they valued some forms of equality more than others. What mattered most to them was that government rested on the consent of the governed, even if that meant an aristocratic democracy. They cared less about giving every citizen an equal chance to hold office. Elections gave citizens two kinds of consent: acceptance of both the process and the outcome, even when elites were chosen. Lotteries, on the other hand, only gave consent to the process, not to the individuals selected. Seen this way, their preference for elections over lotteries makes sense if they prioritized consent over equal opportunity.

The 20th-century Italian thinkers Vilfredo Pareto and Gaetano Mosca (independently) argued that democracy was illusory, and served only to mask the reality of elite rule. They suggested that elite oligarchy is the unbendable law of human nature, due largely to the apathy and division of the masses (as opposed to the drive, initiative and unity of the elites), and that democratic institutions would do no more than shift the exercise of power from oppression to manipulation.

In 1911, German-Italian political scientist Robert Michels formulated the iron law of oligarchy. He argued that oligarchy is unavoidable in any organization due to the practical demands of organizing. In democracy, he noted, organization inevitably produces the dominance of leaders over followers and delegates over those they represent. Michels concluded that democracy's aim to end elite rule is impossible, since democracy tends to legitimize the rule of a particular elite, making oligarchy inevitable. Some have termed the societies produced by modern democracies as neo-feudal and have contrasted democracy with fascism, anarcho-capitalism, theocracy, and absolute monarchy.

A 2014 study led by Princeton professor Martin Gilens of 1,779 U.S. government decisions concluded that "elites and organized groups representing business interests have substantial independent impacts on U.S. government policy, while average citizens and mass-based interest groups have little or no independent influence."

Numerous empirical studies across various democracies including the United States, Spain, Sweden, Switzerland, Canada, Norway and Germany have consistently found that elected representatives tend to respond more to the preferences of very affluent citizens for policy outcomes than those of the average voter.

=== Procedural focus ===
Some perspectives contend that democracy is excessively focused on the procedure by which political decisions are made and lacks broader substance.

Academic Larry Diamond contends that excessive focus on procedure results in a flawed concept of democracy which "privileges elections over other dimensions of democracy and ignores the degree to which multiparty elections (even if they are competitive and uncertain in outcome) may exclude significant portions of the population from contesting for power or advancing or defending their interests, or may leave significant areas of decision making beyond the control of elected officials."

=== Socialist and communist perspectives ===
French revolutionary syndicalist Hubert Lagardelle claimed that French revolutionary syndicalism came to being as the result of "the reaction of the proletariat against idiotic democracy," which he claimed was "the popular form of bourgeois dominance". Lagardelle opposed democracy for its universalism, and believed in the necessity of class separation of the proletariat from the bourgeoisie, as democracy did not recognize the social differences between them.

Chinese communist policymakers argue that policy under democratic systems is largely restricted to ad hoc interventions and that this renders social development vulnerable to market forces. Chinese planners argue that such ad hoc interventions are incapable of coping with fundamental challenges such as environmental degradation, dysfunction in capital markets, and demographic change.

== Practical criticism ==
=== Lobbying and moneyed influence ===
Political representatives may be persuaded to vote against the interests of their constituency interests by special interest groups with significant funding for lobbying. Some aspects of lobbying have been criticized for contributing to a democratic deficit.

Democracies are not immune to corruption. Whilst countries with high levels of democracy tend to have low levels of different forms of corruption, it is also clear that countries with moderate levels of democracy can have high levels of corruption. Similarly, countries with no democracy may have very little corruption. Various features of democratic systems can reduce corruption, but only the combination of sophisticated democratic institutions, such as open and free elections coupled with judicial and legislative constraints, might effectively reduce corruption.

=== Vulnerability to opponents ===
Boaventura de Sousa Santos has argued that "democracy is being so emptied of content that it can be instrumentally defended by those who use it in order to destroy it," and that individuals calling for increased democratization and protection from fascism are labeled as leftists. Some democracies have been criticized for censoring dissent.

Various reasons can be found for eliminating or suppressing political opponents. Methods such as false flags, counterterrorism-laws, planting or creating compromising material, or perpetuation of public fear can be used to suppress dissent. After a failed coup d'état in Turkey, over 110,000 people were removed from office and nearly 40,000 were imprisoned (despite its status as a democratic nation) during the 2016 purges. Fake parties, phantom political rivals, and "scarecrow" opponents may be used to undermine the opposition.

The electoral process in democracies can be corrupted through the giving and receiving of bribes, the threat or use of violence, treatment, or impersonation.

Social bots and other forms of online propaganda, as well as algorithmically driven search engine results, may be used to alter voters' perception of candidates and sway their opinions. In 2016 Andrés Sepúlveda disclosed that he manipulated public opinion to rig elections in Latin America. According to his account, using a budget of $600,000, he led a team of hackers that stole campaign strategies, manipulated social media to create false waves of enthusiasm and derision, and installed spyware in opposition offices to help Enrique Peña Nieto, a right-of-center candidate, win the election. Televised debates and, according to George Bishop, inaccurate opinion polls can in some cases shift election outcomes.

Dan Slater and Lucan Ahmad Way have contended that misinformation has become common in elections around the world. They criticized the FBI for announcing that the agency would examine potentially incriminating evidence against Hillary Clinton's use of a private email server just 11 days before the US election.

=== Inefficiency and instability ===
Democracies can show political polarization, which contributes to political volatility. Reason Wafawarova argued in 2008 that some approaches to democracy may undermine the ability for a developing country to achieve long-term stability and democracy.

Democracy tends to improve conflict resolution. However, spatially concentrated costs and diffuse benefits together with regulatory transaction costs can result in ineffective conflict resolution such as NIMBYism.

The Coase theorem states that non-zero transaction costs will generally lead to inefficient conflict resolution. Daron Acemoglu argues that the Coase theorem extends to politics, where the "rules of the game" in politics need to be enforced to achieve low transaction costs. Groups with political power can prefer inefficient policies and inefficient institutions and oppose further democratization. Anthony Downs has argued that political markets work in much the same way as the economic market and that the democratic process could be responsible for creating equilibrium in the system. However, he also acknowledged that imperfect knowledge in politicians and voters prevented the full realization of that equilibrium.

Income inequality and limited socioeconomic mobility can lead to social unrest and revolutions. The extension of the democratic franchise can be seen as a commitment by the political elite in favor of economic redistribution and political redistribution to prevent social unrest, explaining the Kuznets curve. There is no consensus as to the situations in which democracy actually does reduce economic inequality.

The democratic process can provide short-term incentives for elected politicians, and this may lead to the prioritization of actions or policies with short-term benefits, while longer-term risks such as debt crisis, pensions crisis, climate risk or financial crisis are ignored. Some election systems have been shown to reward financial prudence and debt brakes. Different voting systems lead to different levels of short-termism in politics.

James M. Buchanan and Richard E. Wagner have argued that the nontransparent nature of most tax systems causes a fiscal illusion which results in greater government spending than democratically expected.

=== Low voter turnout ===
Voter turnout being lower than desired in some democracies has been attributed to several causes, including: reduced trust in democratic processes; lack of compulsory voting; political efficacy; wasted votes; political gridlock; and high barriers to entry for new political movements. Lower voter turnout for young adults contributes to gerontocracy.

=== Politicians picking voters ===
Gerrymandering in first-past-the-post voting has been criticized in some cases as politicians picking voters instead of voters picking politicians.

Multiculturalism and identity politics can cause elections to behave like an ethnic or identity headcount, which incentivizes demographic engineering and politicized immigration and naturalization.

== Theocratic criticism ==
In a theocracy, the supreme ruling authority is a deity, rather than the people. Theodemocracy combines authority by both deity and the people.

The practice of orthodox Islam in the form of Salafism can clash with a democratic system. The core precept of Islam, that of "tawheed" (the "oneness of God"), can be interpreted by fundamentalist Salafis to mean, among other things, that democracy as a political system is incompatible with the purported notion that laws not handed down by God should not be recognized.

Carl Schmitt contended that political representation in a liberal democracy was formulaic, and that the mystical nature and personalist ideal of the Catholic sovereign was essential.

Some political leaders in Singapore and China, such as Lee Kuan Yew, have said that Confucianism provides a more "coherent ideological basis for a well-ordered Asian society than Western notions of individual liberty." Chinese Confucian Jiang Qing, who advocates for the political Confucianism of the Gyongyang School, contends that parliamentary democracy is constrained by legal formalism, vulgar populism, and moral relativism.

== Responses to criticism ==
=== Defenses of democracy ===
In his book Against Elections: The Case for Democracy, David Van Reybrouck argues that allocating power through sortition, such as in citizens' assemblies, can resolve many of the shortcomings of representative democracy. "Democracy is not government by the best in our society, because such a thing is called an aristocracy, elected or not ... Democracy, by contrast, flourishes precisely by allowing a diversity of voices to be heard. It's all about having an equal say, an equal right to determine what political action is taken."

The median voter preferences show strategyproofness against some abovementioned criticisms of democracy including vulnerability to opponents, elitism and short-termism of elected politicians.

To safeguard democracy from inappropriate use of the power to declare a state of emergency, it is sometimes proposed that such declarations should include sunset provisions together with a process of extension review. Sunset provisions are also thought to increase the long-term electoral accountability of some other types of law or regulation.

Those concerned by the way public opinion can be swayed by funded campaigns often argue for limitations on the ability of money to play a role in democracy.

Robert Dahl described democracies in terms of polyarchy, where power is vested in many people.

=== Empirical evidence ===
Contemporary empirical evidence on the success of democracy is equivocal. On one hand, democracy is sometimes credited for bringing peace, individual freedoms and economic prosperity. On the other hand, certain studies, such as The Economist Democracy Index indicate that democracies are in decline globally.

== See also ==
- Böckenförde dilemma
- Collective problem solving
- Democracy in China
- Democracy: The God That Failed—2001 book by Hans-Hermann Hoppe
- Group decision-making
- General will § Criticisms
- Liberal democracy § Objections and criticism
- Illiberal democracy
- Neo-feudalism
- Political warfare
- The Myth of the Rational Voter
- The Rise of the Meritocracy
