= Herre =

Herre may refer to:

== Places ==
- Herré, a town in the Landes department, France
- Herre, Norway, a village in Bamble municipality in Telemark county, Norway

== People with the surname ==
- Albert William Herre (1868–1962), American naturalist and taxonomist
- Franz Herre (1926–2026), German journalist and biographer
- Max Herre (born 1973), German musician and member of the band Freundeskreis
- Stefan Herre (politician) (born 1992), German politician
- Wolf Herre (1909–1997), German zoologist

== Other uses ==
- Herre (grape), another name for the French wine grape Fer
- Gros Verdot, another French wine grape that is also known as Herre

== See also ==
- Hot In Herre, a 2002 rap song by Nelly
