= Leitkultur =

Concept in German conservatism

Leitkultur (German: [ˈlaɪtkʊlˌtuːɐ̯]) is a German concept, which can be translated as 'guiding culture' or 'leading culture'. The term was first introduced in 1998 by the German-Syrian sociologist Bassam Tibi and from 2000 onward the term figured prominently in the national political debate in Germany about national identity and immigration.

== Bassam Tibi's definition ==
Bassam Tibi first suggested a 'Leitkultur' in his 1998 book Europa ohne Identität ('Europe without identity'). He defined it in terms of what are commonly called western values, and spoke of a European rather than a German 'Leitkultur'. "The values needed for a guiding culture are those of modernity: democracy, secularism, the Enlightenment, human rights and civil society." (B. Tibi, Europa ohne Identität, p. 154). Tibi advocated cultural pluralism based on value consensus, rather than monoculturalism. However, he also opposed value-blind multiculturalism, and the development of parallel societies where immigrant minorities live and work, isolated from Western society around them. Tibi advocated a structured immigration policy, and opposed illegal immigration into Germany.

== Nationwide debate in Germany ==
Theo Sommer, then publisher of Die Zeit, was one of the first to use the term German guiding culture, as part of a debate about the assimilation of immigrants in Germany, and national core values: "Integration necessarily implies a far-reaching assimilation onto the German guiding culture and its core values" („Der Kopf zählt, nicht das Tuch“, Zeit 30/1998).

However, the term only became a national political issue in October 2000. Friedrich Merz, then leader of the Christian-Democratic CDU in the Bundestag, wrote an article for Die Welt, rejecting multiculturalism, and advocated controls on immigration and compulsory assimilation in the German culture. Merz, after being reminded of the earlier article by Theo Sommer, referred to Sommer as the inspiration for this policy. Sommer, in turn, claimed he was only advocating integration of immigrants, and distanced himself from the call for restriction of immigration ("Einwanderung ja, Ghettos nein - Warum Friedrich Merz sich zu Unrecht auf mich beruft", Zeit 47/2000). Merz, supported by the Brandenburg interior minister Jörg Schönbohm (CDU), proposed an annual immigration limit of 200 000, about 0.25% of the German population. Anything more, according to Merz, would exceed the absorptive capacity of German society. Immigrants have a duty, according to Merz, to adopt the fundamental cultural values of Germany.

Bassam Tibi now protested that politicians had appropriated his proposal for their own purposes, and pronounced the entire debate a 'failure'. Most of the reactions to Merz's proposals were negative, and the debate split along party lines, with the government coalition (social-democratic SPD and the Green Party) rejecting the very notion of a German guiding culture. Cem Özdemir (then Bundestag member, Green Party) and others defended 'integration' as against 'assimilation' of immigrants. Özdemir claimed Germany already is a multicultural society, hence expecting immigrants to assimilate would be tantamount to a denial of reality.

In 2005, the new presiding chairman of the Bundestag, Norbert Lammert (CDU), proposed a re-opening of the debate on a Leitkultur. The proposal, he said in an interview in Die Zeit, has been summarily dismissed without argument; "The noticeable thing about the very short national debate is that the Leitkultur concept was widely rejected, as a negative reflex, but that there was a wide recognition of the problems underlying the debate" ("Das Parlament hat kein Diskussionsmonopol", Zeit 43/2005). There was no noticeable reaction to his suggestion at first: Lammert then proposed to move the discussion to a European level, to define the European guiding culture. In an article in Die Welt, he wrote: "If Europe wishes to preserve the multiplicity of its national identities, and yet establish a collective identity, it must develop a political core ideal, a set of foundational values and convictions. Such a European core ideal must necessarily be based on the common cultural roots of Europe, on its shared history, and on shared religious tradition," (Die Welt, 13 December 2005).

In early 2006, the Jyllands-Posten Muhammad cartoons controversy led to violent protests in Islamic countries, against depictions of Muhammad in a Danish newspaper. Lammert now restated his demand for a re-opening of the Leitkultur debate. The cartoon protests, he said, show that German society must reach a consensus on its "foundational values and a minimal standard of value orientation". The 'constitutional patriotism' (proposed by Jürgen Habermas) would not suffice, since all constitutions are based on non-random cultural assumptions. Fundamental rights, such as freedom of the press and freedom of expression, must be fully supported by a social consensus (Böckenförde dilemma). According to Lammert, legal rights must be supported by and rooted in cultural values, and a nationwide debate on this issue was necessary, to re-establish such a link. The idea of multiculturalism was "perhaps originally well-intentioned", but had reached the end of its useful life: Multiculturalism could not be allowed to create a society where all value systems were treated as equal. In cases of conflicts, society had to decide which cultural views were valid, which value system took precedence, and which did not. Lammert insisted that he had never spoken of a German Leitkultur. He claimed the essential elements of the German culture were not specifically German, but European. (Deutschlandfunk interview with Lammert, reported in the Frankfurter Allgemeine Zeitung of 8 February 2006).

Jörg Schönbohm also remains a vigorous advocate of a German guiding culture: in 2006 he suggested changing the name of the Berlin radio station radiomultikulti into 'Radio Schwarz-Rot-Gold' (black-red-gold, the colours of the German democratic revolution and the flag of Germany).

== Immigrant tests ==
The concept of Leitkultur figured prominently in the national debate about a test for immigrants to Germany. These tests are known in English as 'citizenship tests' (see for example the Life in the United Kingdom test) but they often apply to all immigrants, not just those seeking naturalisation. In Germany, the federal parliament (Bundestag) ultimately decided against a national immigrant test, but the 16 states can set their own tests, which can be based on an officially defined German culture and values.

== See also ==
- Cultural selection theory
- Ethnocentrism
- Immigration
- Jürgen Habermas
- Modernity
- Multiculturalism
- Nation-state
- Values
