= Ernst-Wolfgang Böckenförde =

German judge (1930–2019)

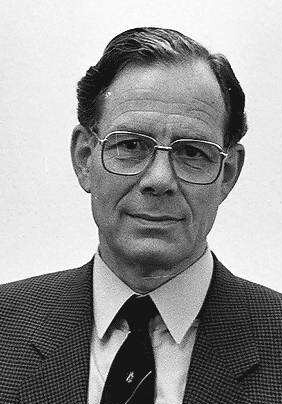
- Böckenförde in 1986

Justice of the Federal Constitutional Court of Germany
- In office 20 December 1983 – 3 May 1996
- Preceded by: Joachim Rottmann
- Succeeded by: Winfried Hassemer

Personal details
- Born: 19 September 1930 Kassel, Prussia, Germany
- Died: 24 February 2019 (aged 88) Au, Baden-Württemberg, Germany
- Party: Social Democratic Party of Germany
- Parent(s): Josef Böckenförde and Gertrud Merrem
- Relatives: Werner Böckenförde (brother)
- Awards: Romano Guardini Award; Hannah Arendt Prize; Sigmund Freud Prize; Grand Cross of Merit

Academic background
- Education: University of Münster; LMU Munich
- Theses: Gesetz und gesetzgebende Gewalt (1956); Die verfassungsgeschichtliche Forschung im 19. Jahrhundert (1960)
- Doctoral advisors: Franz Schnabel; Hans Julius Wolff
- Other advisor: Joachim Ritter

Academic work
- Discipline: Public law
- Institutions: Heidelberg University; Bielefeld University; University of Freiburg
- Notable ideas: Böckenförde dilemma

Ernst-Wolfgang Böckenförde (German: [ɛʁnst ˈvɔlfɡaŋ ˈbœkŋ̍ˌføːɐ̯də]; 19 September 1930 – 24 February 2019) was a German legal scholar and a justice on Germany's Federal Constitutional Court. He was a professor at the University of Freiburg and the author of more than 20 books and 80 articles dealing with legal and constitutional theory, as well as political theory, political philosophy and Catholic political thought. Böckenförde was considered a member of the Ritter School.

== Life ==
Böckenförde was born on 19 September 1930 in Kassel. His parents were forester Josef Böckenförde (1894–1962) and his wife Gertrud (née Merrem; 1899–1977). As a child, he attended the Wilhelmsgymnasium in Kassel, where he passed his Abitur.

Böckenförde received a PhD in law in Münster in 1956, for a dissertation he wrote under the supervision of Hans Julius Wolff. He also received a PhD in history in 1960 from LMU Munich for a thesis supervised by Franz Schnabel. In 1964, he completed his postdoctoral habilitation with a thesis titled The power of organisation in the purview of the government. A survey of constitutional law in the Federal Republic of Germany. He became Professor of Public Law, Constitutional History, Legal History and Philosophy of Law at Heidelberg University in the same year. In 1969, he moved to Bielefeld University, and in 1977 to the University of Freiburg, where he remained until his retirement.

Böckenförde served as a member of the second senate of the Federal Constitutional Court from 1983 until 1996. Into his tenure fall several path-breaking decisions for the Federal Republic of Germany, including decisions pertaining to the deployment of missiles, the law of political parties, and the legal regulation of abortion.

Böckenförde was a member of the Social Democratic Party of Germany (SPD) since 1967. He was also a practising Catholic. As such, he worked in several institutions, including the Bensberger Kreis, a circle of Catholic intellectuals, as well as serving as a counsel for the Central Committee of German Catholics. From 1971 until 1976 Böckenförde was a member of the Special Parliamentary Commission of Inquiry on Constitutional Reform.

Böckenförde received numerous awards for his academic and public service commitments, among them honorary doctorates from the Faculties of Catholic Theology of the Ruhr University Bochum (1999) and the University of Tübingen (2005), and from the Law Schools of Bielefeld University (1999), the University of Münster (2001) and the University of Basel (1987). He also received the Reuchlin Award of the City of Pforzheim for outstanding work in the humanities (1978), the order of merit of the state of Baden-Württemberg (2003), the Romano Guardini Award of the Catholic Academy in Bavaria for work in the field of the philosophy of religion (2004), the Hannah Arendt Prize for Political Thought (2004), the Sigmund Freud Prize for scholarly prose (2012), and the Grand Cross of Merit (2016), the highest tribute the Federal Republic of Germany can pay to individuals for services to the nation.

A sentence from a 1964 article of his caused decades of discussion in German and European political thought. It became known as the Böckenförde dilemma: "The liberal secular state lives on premises that it cannot itself guarantee."

Böckenförde last lived in Au near Freiburg, where he died on 24 February 2019, aged 88.

== Writings (English translation) ==
- Böckenförde, Ernst Wolfgang (1991). State, society, and liberty: studies in political theory and constitutional law. New York: Berg : Distributed exclusively in the US and Canada by St. Martin's Press. ISBN 978-0-85496-595-3.
- "Carl Schmitt Revisited". Telos 109 (Fall 1996). New York: Telos Press.
- "The Concept of the Political as the Key to Understanding Carl Schmitt’s Constitutional Theory", in The Canadian Journal of Law and Jurisprudence, January 1997, Vol. 10, 5. (Translated by Heiner Bielefeldt from "Der Begriff des Politischen als Schlüssel zum staatsrechtlichen Werk Carl Schmitts (1988)").
- Constitutional and Political Theory: Selected Writings, edited by Mirjam Künkler and Tine Stein, Oxford University Press 2017, ISBN 978-0-19-871496-5.
- Religion, Law, and Democracy: Selected Writings, edited by Mirjam Künkler and Tine Stein, Oxford University Press 2021, ISBN 978-0-19-881863-2.
