= Gerd Bohner =

German psychologist

Gerd Walter Bohner
- Born: 1959 (age 66–67); Karlsruhe
- Education: Heidelberg University (Diplom, PhD); Mannheim University (Dr. habil.)
- Scientific career
- Fields: social psychology; experimental psychology; gender studies
- Workplaces: Mannheim University (1997); Würzburg University (1998); University of Kent (1998–2001); Bielefeld University (2001–)
- Thesis: Einflüsse der Stimmung auf die kognitive Verarbeitung persuasiver Kommunikation und auf nachfolgendes Verhalten (1990)
- Doctoral advisor: Norbert Schwarz
- Doctoral students: Hans-Peter Erb; Friederike Eyssel; 29 others
- Website: uni-bielefeld.de

Gerd W. Bohner (born 1959) is a professor of social psychology, experimental psychology and gender studies at Bielefeld University.

== Academia ==
After graduating from the Goethe Gymnasium Karlsruhe in 1978 and doing his civilian service in a day-care centre for disabled children from 1978 to 1980, Bohner studied psychology at the University of Heidelberg from 1980 to 1986, when he obtained his diploma, and was awarded his PhD in 1990. In 1997 he habilitated at the University of Mannheim, holding a temporary professorship in group sociology and social psychology afterwards. The following year, Bohner held a temporary chair in general and social psychology at the University of Würzburg. From 1998 to 2001, he was a senior lecturer to professor of social Psychology at the University of Kent. Since 2001, he has been head of the Social Psychology Unit at Bielefeld University's Department of Psychology. From 2007 to 2009 he served as Dean of the Faculty of Psychology and Sports Science. Currently he is a board member of the Institute for Interdisciplinary Research on Conflict and Violence (Institut für interdisziplinäre Konflikt- und Gewaltforschung). His main research areas include attitudes, social judgement, social influence, marketing and advertising psychology, relations between groups, sexual violence, and sexual harassment. He was founding editor-in-chief of the academic journal Social Psychology (2007–2010) and editor of the Zeitschrift für Sozialpsychologie (2003–2006).

== Selected publications ==
- with N. Dickel. 2011. Attitudes and attitude change. Annual Review of Psychology 62: 391–417. doi:10.1146/annurev.psych.121208.131609
- with A. Pina, G. T. Viki, and F. Siebler. 2010. Using social norms to reduce men's rape proclivity: Perceived rape myth acceptance of out-groups may be more influential than that of in-groups. Psychology, Crime and Law 16: 671–693. doi:10.1080/1068316X.2010.492349
- with F. Eyssel. 2010. Schema effects of rape myth acceptance on judgments of guilt and blame in rape cases: The role of perceived entitlement to judge. Journal of Interpersonal Violence 26. doi:10.1177/0886260510370593 (published online 25 May 2010).
- with F. Eyssel, P. Süssenbach, and P. Schreiber. 2009. Neuentwicklung und Validierung eines szenariobasierten Verfahrens zur Erfassung der Neigung zu sexueller Aggression. [Development and validation of a scenario-based method to record the proclivity to become sexually aggressive] Diagnostica 55: 117–127.
- with F. Eyssel, A. Pina, F. Siebler, and G. T. Viki. 2009. Rape myth acceptance: Affective, behavioural, and cognitive effects of beliefs that blame the victim and exonerate the perpetrator. In Rape: Challenging Contemporary Thinking, eds. M. A. H. Horvath and J. M. Brown. Cullompton, UK: Willan.
- with F. Siebler and S. Sabelus. 2008. A refined computer harassment paradigm: Validation, and test of hypotheses about target characteristics. Psychology of Women Quarterly 32: 22–35.
- with H. Gerger, H. Kley, and F. Siebler. 2007. The Acceptance of Modern Myths about Sexual Aggression (AMMSA) Scale: Development and validation in German and English. Aggressive Behavior 33: 422–440.
- with H.-P. Erb, M. Hewstone, L. Werth, and M.-A. Reinhard, 2006. Large minorities and small majorities: Interactive effects of inferred and explicit consensus on attitudes. Basic and Applied Social Psychology 28: 221–231.
- with F. Siebler and J. Schmelcher. 2006. Social norms and the likelihood of raping: Perceived rape myth acceptance of others affects men's rape proclivity. Personality and Social Psychology Bulletin 32: 286–297.
- with C. I. Jarvis, F. Eyssel, and F. Siebler. 2005. The causal impact of rape myth acceptance on men's rape proclivity: Comparing sexually coercive and noncoercive men. European Journal of Social Psychology 35: 819–828.
