= Goethe-Schule =

Goethe-Schule, Goethe-Gymnasium, or similar, may refer to:

In Germany:

- Goethe-Gymnasium, Frankfurt
- Goethe-Gymnasium Karlsruhe
- Goethe-Gymnasium, Hannover

Outside Germany:

- Goethe-Schule Buenos Aires, Argentina
- Colegio Goethe, Asuncion, Paraguay

== See also ==
- Goethe-Institut
- Goethe-Oberlyzeum, Königsberg, East Prussia
