= Franz Schnabel =

German historian (1887–1966)

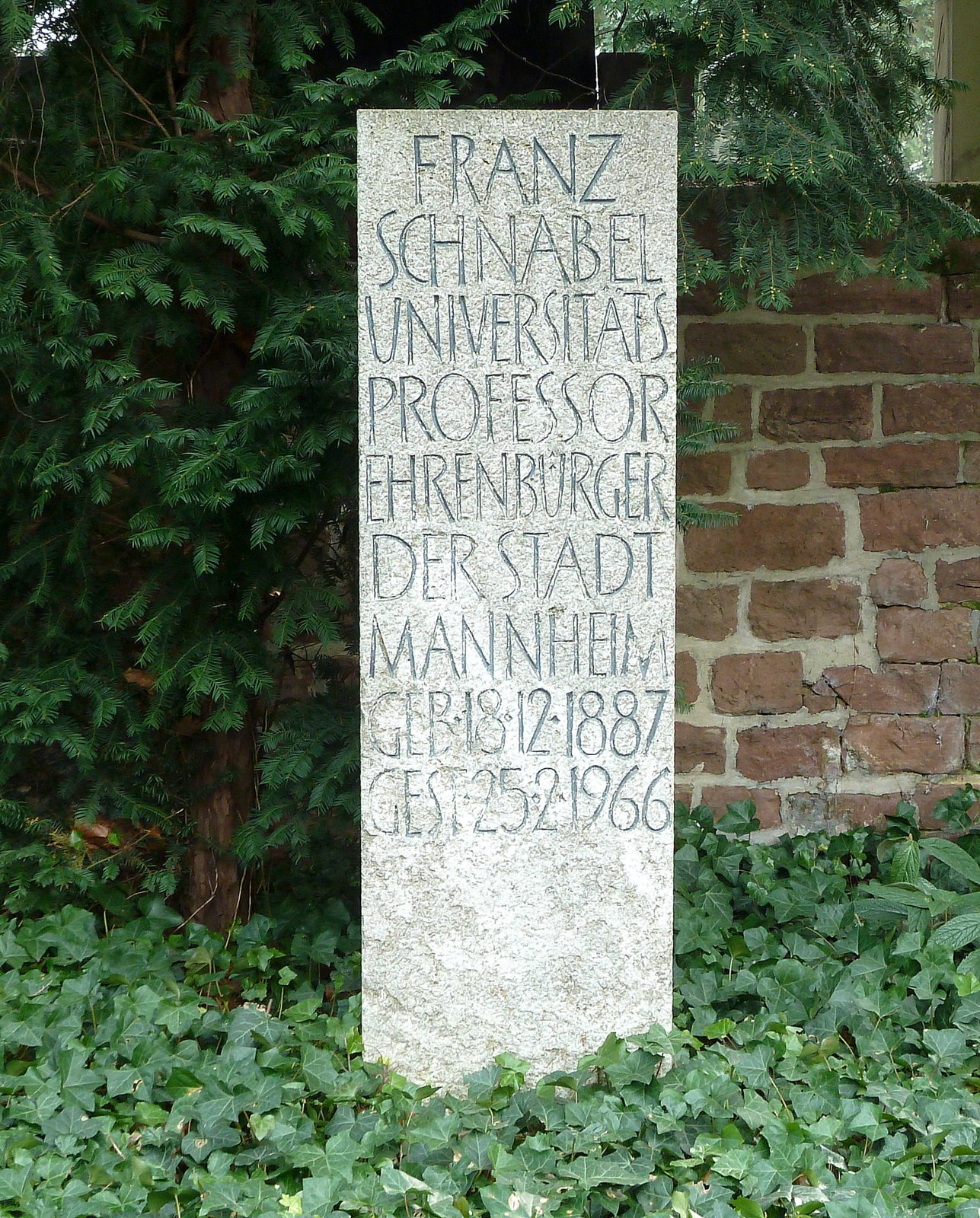
Franz Schnabel grave in Hauptfriedhof Mannheim

Franz Schnabel (18 December 1887, Mannheim – 25 February 1966, Munich) was a German historian. He wrote about German history, particularly the "cultural crisis" of the 19th century in Germany as well as humanism after the end of the Third Reich. He opposed Nazism during the Second World War.

== Early life ==
Schnabel was born in Mannheim as the son of the merchant Karl Schnabel and his wife Maria Anna, née Guillemin. Schnabel's parents - the father, a Protestant, the mother a Catholic - had married in 1885 and raised their three children n the Roman Catholic Church faith: the second born Franz had an older and a younger sister. Schnabel grew in the milieu of liberalism in Baden. The bourgeoisie of his native city and, looking back, the close relationship to France that existed through his mother's family, had a formative influence on his personal development: "Thanks to my mother's relatives I came to Normandy and Paris as a boy. But whoever treads French soil in his youth will always take with him a sense of the great contours of world history". Schnabel attended the Karl-Friedrich-Gymnasium Mannheim from which he graduated in 1906. He then studied history, German studies, French and Latin at the Humboldt University of Berlin and the Ruprecht Karl University of Heidelberg. In 1910, he passed the Staatsexamen for the teaching profession at grammar schools and was awarded his doctorate in the same year under Hermann Oncken with the thesis The Unification of Political Catholicism in Germany in 1848.

== Career ==
=== Early career ===
In 1911, Schnabel entered the Baden teaching profession as a teacher's candidate, but took leave of absence at the beginning of 1914 to work on a History of the Baden Estates on behalf of the Badische Historische Kommission. The project could not be realised due to the outbreak of the First World War: Schnabel was drafted in April 1915, served on the Western Front throughout the war and was not released from the army until February 1919. He immediately returned to the Baden school system and taught Latin, French, and history at Karlsruhe schools: 1919/20 at the Lessing-Gymnasium Karlsruhe, Germany's first grammar school for girls, and 1920 to 1922 at the Goethe-Gymnasium Karlsruhe, a secondary school for boys. Parallel to his teaching, Schnabel, encouraged by the teacher Oncken, pursued his scientific career and habilitated as early as 1920 at the Karlsruhe Institute of Technology with the paper Geschichte der Ministerverantwortlichkeit in Baden, supervised by Hermann Wätjen. As early as 1922, he was appointed to the historical chair at the Technical University of Karlsruhe, which he held until his dismissal in 1936. In addition to his professorship, Schnabel served as director of the Generallandesarchiv Karlsruhe from 1924 to 1927.

Schnabel's years at the Karlsruhe chair were characterised by extraordinary productivity. Following his habilitation thesis, he continued his research on early constitutionalism in Baden and in 1927, published two concise biographies of the Baden politicians, compiled from archival material Sigismund von Reitzenstein and Ludwig von Liebenstein. Already in 1920, Schnabel had taken over the elaboration of a source study, which was to achieve for modern history what Wilhelm Wattenbach had achieved for the Middle Ages; the work, published in 1931 and still relevant today, made the sources of the Reformation period accessible until 1550, but was not continued by Schnabelt. In the same year 1931, on the occasion of the 100th anniversary of the death of Heinrich Friedrich Karl vom und zum Stein, Schnabel published a brief biography of the Prussian reformer, who was accused by Gerhard Ritter of instrumentalizing Stein for current political purposes; Schnabel and Ritter discussed this question controversially. In the Weimar years, Schnabel also emerged as a textbook author: his textbook Geschichte der neuesten Zeit, first published in 1923 by B. G. Teubner Verlag, was also published as an independent work for other circles, had several editions and was still relevant for students after 1945. Above all, however, Schnabel's main work since the mid-1920s was the Deutsche Geschichte im neunzehnten Jahrhundert, which appeared in four volumes in 1929, 1933, 1934, and 1937. In this unfinished work, which did not go beyond the year 1840, Schnabel attempted to analyse the political history as well as the social, cultural, economic, and technological history of the 19th century in their interaction and to interpret them as prerequisites for the "cultural crisis" of the 20th century. A fifth volume entitled Das Erwachen des deutschen Volkstums was completed by Schnabel as a manuscript, but could not be published because of the Nazi censorship.

In contrast to most historians of his time, Schnabel had a positive attitude towards the Weimar Republic, which he expressed in public, in lectures, and in his scientific work, but without becoming involved in party politics. His campaign reached a climax in October 1932, when he spoke out in the Hochland magazine against the Preußenschlag of the Papen government. His text Neudeutsche Reichsreform began with the dramatic words: "Even if the discussion should be closed and in the future will only be dictated in the German fatherland, it remains the duty of the spiritual leading class to raise its voice as long as this is possible". Despite his clear commitment to the rule of law and federalism, a phase can be discerned after his accession to power, in which Schnabel took part in efforts to build a bridge between Catholicism and National Socialism, for example by taking up the concept of the Ständestaates or the Reich concept.

This phase ended in 1935 at the latest, when Schnabel was indirectly affected by Walter Frank's actions against his teacher, Hermann Oncken: In his article against Oncken, Frank casually referred to Schnabel as a "clerical historian" and insinuated regime hostility. On 15 July 1936, Schnabel was released in Karlsruhe. He immediately moved to Heidelberg, where he lived as a private scholar until 1945. In these years, Schnabel published mainly articles on cultural history in the daily press, especially in the Frankfurter Zeitung In addition he published essays and numerous reviews in the magazine Hochland, until it had to be discontinued in 1941, as well as in other journals. In 1944, Schnabel would almost still have been called up for military service, despite his 57 years in the meantime, but was released through the intervention of the friendly ex-general Bernhard Schwertfeger.

In September 1945, Schnabel was appointed state director for education and culture in the district of Baden, the northern part of the newly formed state Württemberg-Baden. He owed this appointment to his acquaintance with Heinrich Köhler, who was the district president at that time. In October 1945, Schnabel was also reinstated as professor in Karlsruhe. However, he now aspired to a professorship at a university, preferably in Heidelberg. An opportunity arose in 1946 when Willy Andreas had to vacate his chair under pressure from the American occupying power. Schnabel pursued his appointment, against which the philosophical faculty in Heidelberg massively resisted. In the background were Schnabel's statements from 1945, in which he had reproached the University of Heidelberg in particular for having attracted the future Nazi elites even before 1933. Against the attempt of the state government to enforce its cult official Schnabel in Heidelberg, the university gave an expert opinion that was devastating for Schnabel and was able to prevent the appeal. Schnabel drew the consequences from his broken relationship with the university and resigned as state director.

=== Later career ===
Already in the summer of 1945, the Ludwig-Maximilians-Universität München (LMU) approached Schnabel with the question whether he would accept an appointment. In Munich in early summer 1945, numerous professors had been dismissed under pressure from the American occupying forces, including Heinrich Köhler, who had held the chair of Middle and Modern History. Schnabel showed interest in this professorship, but did not definitely accept it. This for two reasons: on the one hand, he would have preferred an appointment in Heidelberg, on the other hand he disliked the fact that it was considered to rededicate said chair to a Concordat Chair in order to be able to appoint the Protestant Hermann Heimpel to the previous Concordat Chair of Medieval History. Schnabel did not accept the chair in Munich until February 10, 1947, after his Heidelberg ambitions had been shattered and the rededication of the chair after Heimpel's failed appointment was off the table. Schnabel was already teaching as a visiting professor in Munich in the summer of 1947 and took over the chair of Medieval and Modern History, which Walter Goetz had held as a substitute, on 1 November 1947. When Schnabel had reached retirement age in 1955, he was privileged to determine the date of his retirement himself. In fact, he was only retired at his own request after the 1962 summer semester at the age of almost 75 and continued to lecture until 1964. He was the only professor in Munich who represented the history of modern times and always resisted an increase in the teaching staff; thus the chair was divided only after his retirement into one for early modern history and one for modern history, to which Fritz Wagner and Walter Bußmann were appointed. In Katharina Weigand (ed.): Münchner Historiker zwischen Politik und Wissenschaft. 150 Jahre Historisches Seminar der Ludwig-Maximilians-Universität (Beiträge zur Geschichte der Ludwig-Maximilians-Universität München). Munich 2010, pp. 31–53, here p. 45 in the Bayerischen Akademie der Wissenschaften of which he was president from 1951 to 1959. Since 1948 he was also a full member of the Bavarian Academy of Sciences.

Schnabel's years at the Munich chair differed markedly from his time in Karlsruhe. While his own research had been the focus of his work there, in Munich he concentrated entirely on his role as an academic teacher. The expert in constitutional law Ernst-Wolfgang Böckenförde, who received his doctorate in history under Schnabel, passed on Schnabel's statement in this regard: "I am of the opinion that in today's world everyone should be able to carry out a socially necessary activity. And I believe that teaching to students is socially more necessary than writing your own books. It was clear to me when I accepted the call to Munich that I would not be coming here to continue my work on my German history." Schnabel's lectures in the Große Aula or in the Auditorium maximum, always held on Monday and Tuesday afternoon for two hours each, always had 800 to 1200 listeners. They were also well attended by students of other subjects and from the Münchner Stadtgesellschaft. Schnabel became a magnet for the Ludwig-Maximilians-Universität München, attracting students, comparable only with Romano Guardini. It was only in the Munich years that Schnabel was able to train his own academic students, including Franz Herre, Heinrich Lutz, Karl Otmar von Aretin, Friedrich Hermann Schubert, Eberhard Weis, Erich Angermann, Lothar Gall, Hans Schmidt, Peter Hoffmann, Peter Krüger, Adelheid von Saldern and Karl-Egon Lönne.

Schnabel's four-volume Deutsche Geschichte im neunzehnten Jahrhundert was reprinted unchanged between 1947 and 1951, appeared in 1964/65 in an eight-volume paperback edition and was last published by Deutscher Taschenbuch Verlag in 1987. Schnabel did not work on a continuation of his main work after 1945, nor did he print the fifth volume of the work. After his death, his appearance was announced, later still asked for from time to time, bis heute aber nicht realisiert. Thomas Hertfelder vertrat die Auffassung, dies sei "zu Schnabels Glück" nicht geschehen: Schnabel habe in diesem Band in einer Mischung aus Zensur und Selbstzensur liberale Positionen preisgegeben und sich von der westeuropäischen politischen Tradition abgewandt.

Schnabel continued his career as a textbook author after the war. Other publications of the Munich years were mostly the result of lectures that were initiated by anniversaries, such as in 1951 on the occasion of the 150th anniversary of the Verlag Herder or 1958 on the occasion of the 100th anniversary of the founding of the Munich Historical Commission. Schnabel's great concern after the end of the Third Reich and as a reaction to it was the renewal of the humanistic educational idea, for which his 1955 academy lecture Das humanistische Bildungsgut im Wandel von Staat und Gesellschaft is characteristic.

Schnabel took part in the debates after 1945 about the person and work of Otto von Bismarck, and in a review of the Bismarck biography by Erich Eyck, Schnabel argued that the Kleindeutsche Lösung of the German Question had been a mistake. Well-known colleagues, including Gerhard Ritter, who had already criticized Schnabel's liberal interpretation of Freiherr vom Stein in the early 1930s, argued against Schnabel's position.

== Death ==
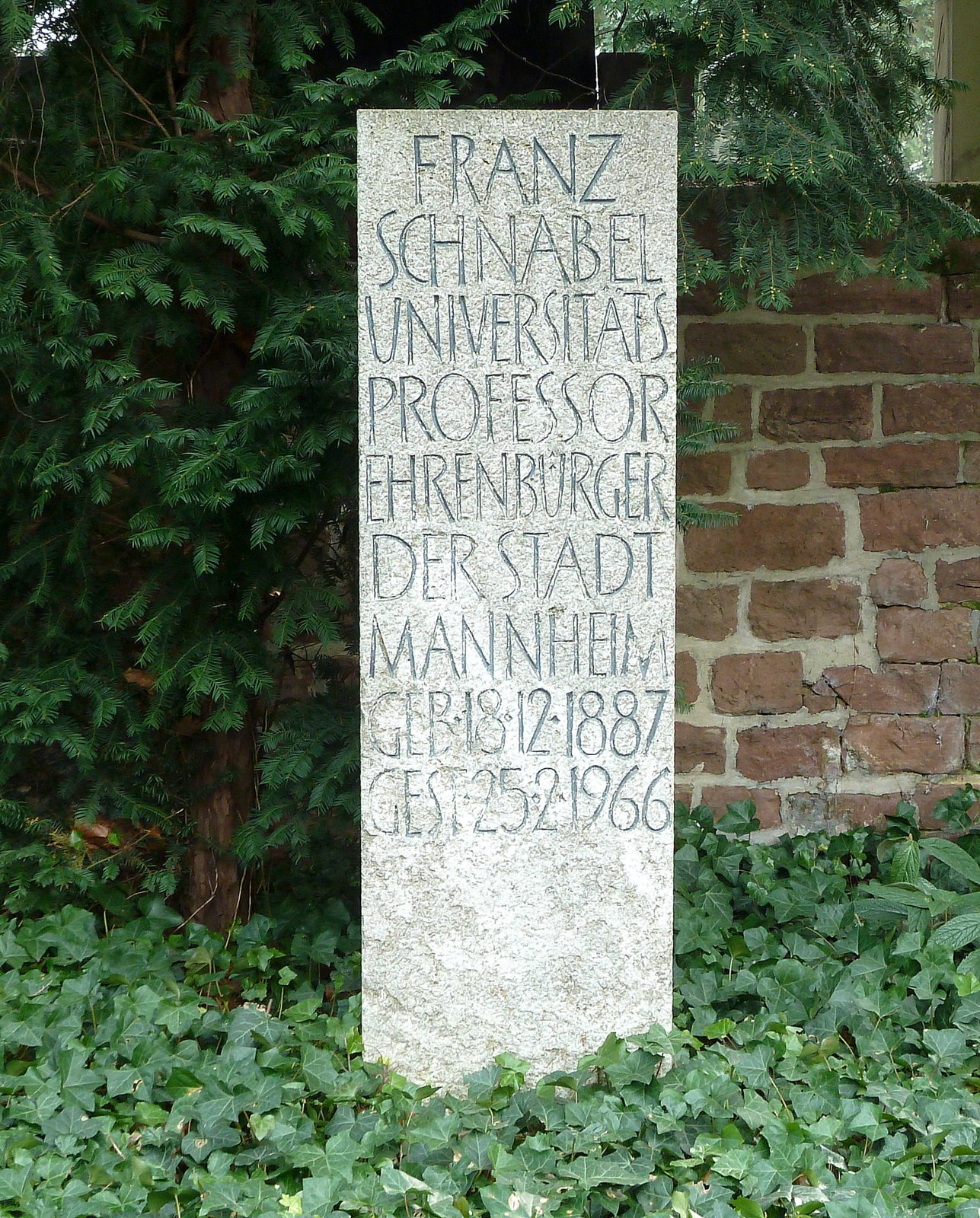
Schnabel's grave at the Hauptfriedhof Mannheim

The grave of his parents Karl and Maria (née Guillemin) as well as his sister Katharina were laid to rest. Next to Schnabel, his sister Maria (1889–1971) was buried, who took care of him for decades.

== Honours ==
In 1954, Schnabel was awarded honorary citizenship of the city of Mannheim, and in 1961 he received the Bavarian Order of Merit. Schnabel was an honorary doctor of engineering and political science (Aachen and Munich) and an honorary member of the British Historical Association and the American Historical Association. A street in Feudenheim and in Karlsruhe-Hagsfeld and a building of the Karlsruhe Institute of Technology are named after him. The Franz Schnabel Memorial Medal, an award of the Upper Rhine Foundation for History and Culture for high school graduates in Baden-Württemberg, which is presented to the best student of the year for outstanding achievements in the subject history, was named after him.

== Publications ==
A bibliography of Franz Schnabel's publications compiled by Karl-Egon Lönne appeared in Franz Schnabel: Abhandlungen und Vorträge 1914–1965. edit. by Heinrich Lutz. Herder, Freiburg/Basel/Wien 1970, pp. 369–402.

- Der Zusammenschluß des politischen Katholizismus in Deutschland im Jahre 1848. Winter, Heidelberg 1910 (Heidelberger Abhandlungen zur mittleren und neueren Geschichte, 29).
- Geschichte der Ministerverantwortlichkeit in Baden. G. Braun, Karlsruhe 1922.
- Freiherr vom Stein. B. G. Teubner, Leipzig/Berlin 1931.
- Deutsche Geschichte im neunzehnten Jahrhundert. Herder, Freiburg im Breisgau 1929–1937; Nachdruck: Deutscher Taschenbuch Verlag, Munich 1987.
  - Vol. 1: Die Grundlagen. 1929, Reprint: ISBN 3-423-04461-6.
  - Vol. 2: Monarchie und Volkssouveränität. 1933; Reprint: ISBN 3-423-04462-4.
  - Vol. 3: Erfahrungswissenschaften und Technik. 1934; Reprint: ISBN 3-423-04463-2.
  - Vol. 4: Die religiösen Kräfte. 1937; Reprint: ISBN 3-423-04464-0.
- Abhandlungen und Vorträge 1914–1965. Edit. by Heinrich Lutz. Herder, Freiburg/Basel/Vienna 1970.

== Literature ==
- Patrick Bahners: "Kritik und Erneuerung. Der Historismus bei Franz Schnabel." In Tel Aviver Jahrbuch für deutsche Geschichte 25 (1996), pp. 117–153.
- Franz Schnabel – zu Leben und Werk (1887–1966). Vorträge zur Feier seines 100. Geburtstages. Oldenbourg, Munich 1988, ISBN 3-486-54871-9.
- Lothar Gall (2007). "Schnabel, Franz Bernhard Gerhard". Neue Deutsche Biographie (in German). Vol. 23. Berlin: Duncker & Humblot. pp. 273–274. (full text online).
- Thomas Hertfelder: Franz Schnabel und die deutsche Geschichtswissenschaft. Geschichtsschreibung zwischen Historismus und Kulturkritik (1910–1945) (Schriftenreihe der Historischen Kommission bei der Bayerischen Akademie der Wissenschaften. Vol. 60). 2 volumes. Vandenhoeck und Ruprecht, Göttingen 1998, ISBN 3-525-36053-3, (online: Vol. 1, Vol. 2).
- Thomas Hertfelder: "Franz Schnabel." In Katharina Weigand (ed.): Münchner Historiker zwischen Politik und Wissenschaft. 150 Jahre Historisches Seminar der Ludwig-Maximilians-Universität München. Utz, Munich 2010, ISBN 978-3-8316-0969-7, pp. 233–258.
- Thomas Hertfelder: "Historie als Kulturkritik. Zu einem Interpretationsmuster in Franz Schnabels 'Deutscher Geschichte im neunzehnten Jahrhundert'." In Historisches Jahrbuch 116 (1996), pp. 440–475.
- Karl-Egon Lönne: "Franz Schnabel." In Hans-Ulrich Wehler: Deutsche Historiker. Vol. IX. Vandenhoeck u. Ruprecht, Göttingen 1982, ISBN 3-525-33474-5, pp. 81–101.
- Clemens Rehm (ed.): Franz Schnabel – eine andere Geschichte. Historiker, Demokrat, Pädagoge. Begleitpublikation zur Ausstellung des Generallandesarchivs Karlsruhe und des Instituts für Geschichte der Universität Karlsruhe (TH). Freiburg im Breisgau 2002, ISBN 3-451-20356-1.
- Peter Steinbach, Angela Borgstedt (ed.): Franz Schnabel – Der Historiker des freiheitlichen Verfassungsstaates. Ausstellungskatalog mit zahlreichen Fachbeiträgen, Berlin 2009, ISBN 978-3-86732-071-9.
- Bernhard Stier: "Franz Schnabel (1887–1966)." In Technikgeschichte 76 (2009), issue 4, pp. 361–367 (online).
