= Italian city-states =

Political entities in medieval Italy

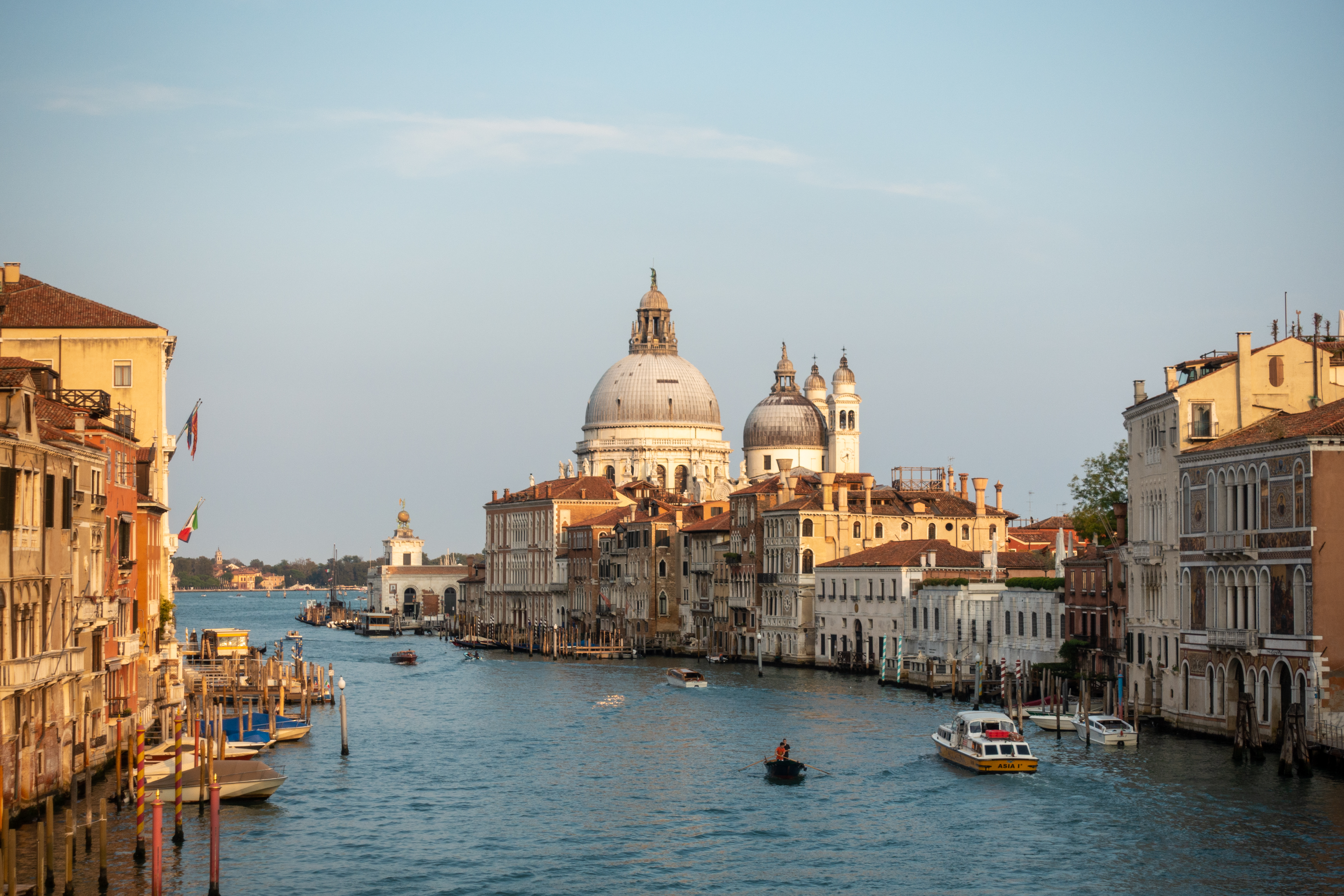
Venice was one of the most important Italian city-states.

The Italian city-states were numerous political and independent territorial entities that existed in the Italian Peninsula from antiquity to the formation of the Kingdom of Italy in the late 19th century.

The ancient Italian city-states were Etruscan (Dodecapolis), Latin, most famously Rome, and Greek (Magna Graecia), but also of Umbrian, Celtic and other origins. After the fall of the Western Roman Empire, urban settlements in Italy generally enjoyed a greater continuity than settlements in western Europe. Many of these cities were survivors of earlier Etruscan, Umbrian and Roman towns which had existed within the Roman Empire. The republican institutions of Rome had also survived.

Some feudal lords existed with a servile labour force and huge tracts of land, but by the 11th century, many cities, including Venice, Milan, Florence, Genoa, Pisa, Lucca, Cremona, Siena, Città di Castello, Perugia, and many others, had become large trading metropoles, able to obtain independence from their formal sovereigns. Some of these cities grew in importance and became duchies and maritime empires.

Republic's name	Capital city	Duration of rule
Republic of Venice	Venice	697–1797
Republic of Pisa	Pisa	1000–1406
Republic of Siena	Siena	1125–1555
Republic of Cospaia	Cospaia	1441–1836
Republic of Sassari	Sassari	1259–1323
Republic of Massa	Massa Marittima	1225–1336
Republic of Lucca	Lucca	1160–1805
Golden Ambrosian Republic	Milan	1447–1450
Republic of Genoa	Genoa	1000–1797
Republic of Ancona	Ancona	1000–1532
Republic of Noli	Noli	1192–1797

== Antiquity ==
The cities of Magna Graecia and of Etruria are among the earliest examples of city-states in Italy. The Latin settlement of Rome also was a city-state, founded in the 753 BC. Rome eventually created many colonies and municipi on earlier Etruscan, Umbrian, or Celtic settlements throughout Italy. The network of Roman cities in Italy survived the fall of the Western Roman Empire and provided the basis for the re-emergence of city-states in the Medieval period.

== Medieval and modern period ==
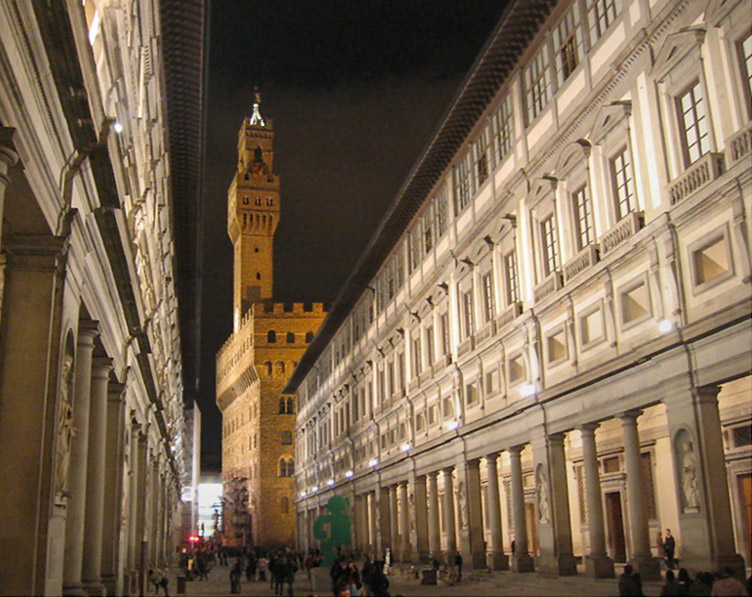
Florence was one of the most important Italian city-states.

Among the earliest medieval city-states of Italy, that already started to emerge in the 7th century, were the Duchy of Naples, Duchy of Amalfi, Gaeta and the Republic of Venice which, although nominally under Byzantine control, were effectively independent. (Note: Naples from 661, Amalfi and Gaeta from 839, Venice about from 840 (Pactum Lotharii). The acquisition of Venice's independence began gradually; an important date was 742, when the Doge title was finally subtracted from the appointment of the Byzantine emperor.) The Duchy of Spoleto and the Duchy of Benevento were under Lombard control.

=== Communes ===
The other early Italian city-states to appear in northern and central Italy arose as a result of a struggle to gain greater autonomy during the rule of the Holy Roman Empire. The Lombard League was an alliance that included at its apex most of the cities of northern Italy including Milan, Piacenza, Cremona, Mantua, Crema, Bergamo, Brescia, Bologna, Padua, Treviso, Vicenza, Verona, Lodi, Reggio Emilia and Parma, although its membership changed through time. Other city-states were associated to these "commune" cities, like Genoa, Turin and, in central Italy, the city states of Florence, Pisa, Lucca, Siena, Ancona, Città di Castello, Perugia, Terni, Assisi among others.

=== Duchies ===
South of Rome and the Papal States were the duchies of Salerno, Amalfi, Duchy of Naples and Duchy of Gaeta. Other independent cities were Bari and Trani, which in 1130 were united in the newly created Norman Kingdom of Sicily.

=== Maritime republics ===
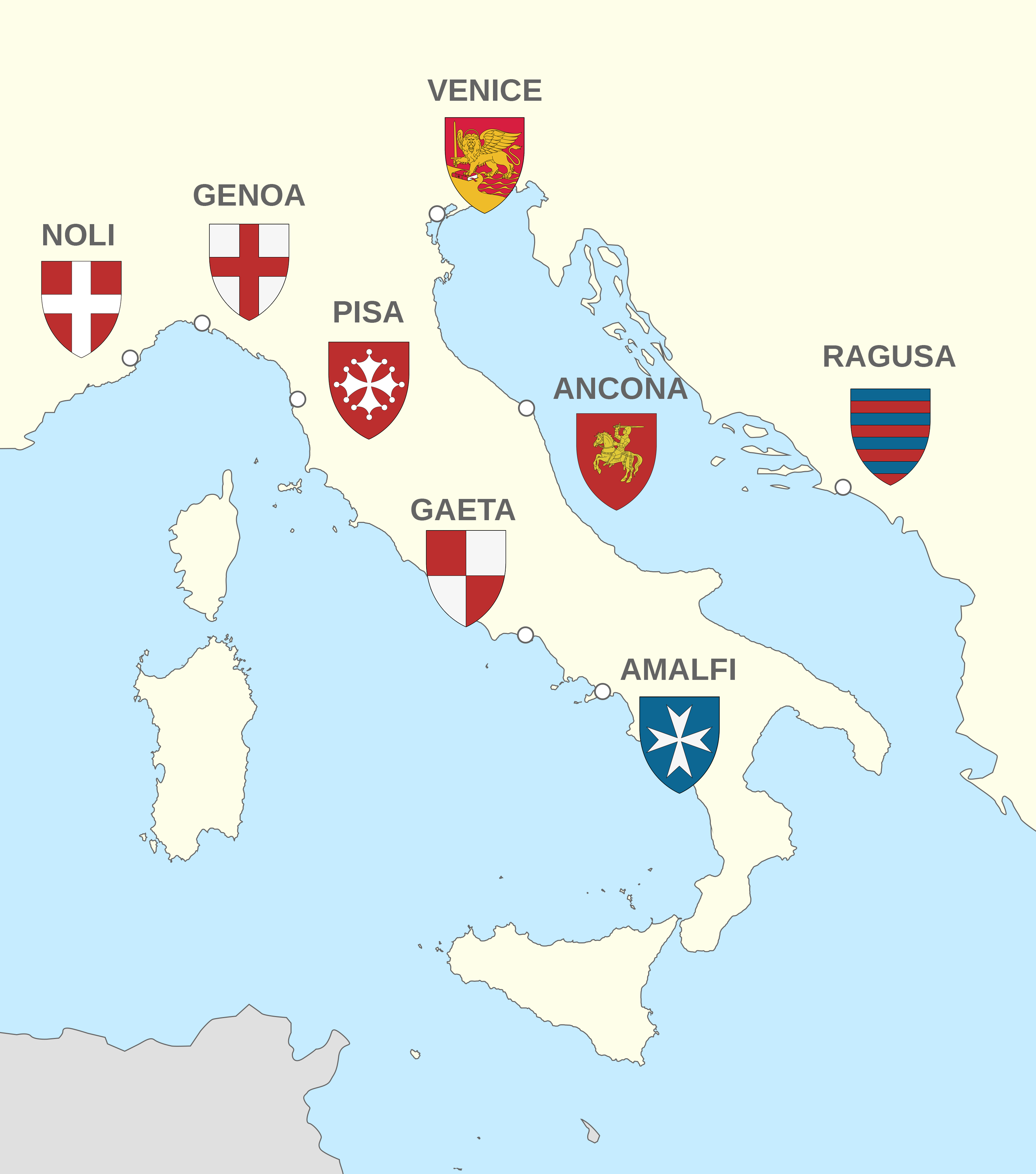
The maritime republics of medieval Italy: Venice, Genoa, Amalfi, Pisa, Noli, Ancona, Ragusa, Gaeta

Amalfi, Gaeta and Venice in the 11th century were already autonomous maritime republics. Around 1100, Genoa, Pisa and Ancona emerged as independent maritime republics too: trade, shipbuilding and banking helped support their powerful navies in the Mediterranean in those medieval centuries.

== Difference from northern Europe ==
Political map of Italy in 1000 AD (CE)

Between the 12th and 13th centuries, Italy was vastly different from feudal Europe north of the Alps. The Peninsula was a melange of political and cultural elements, not a unified state.

The very mountainous nature of Italy's landscape was a barrier to effective inter-city communication. The Po plain was an exception: it was the only large contiguous area, and most city states that fell to invasion were located there. Those that survived the longest were in the more rugged regions, such as Florence or Venice, which was protected by its lagoon.

The rugged terrain of the Alps prevented the Holy Roman Emperors or various German princes and lords from attacking the northern part of Italy, safeguarding the country from permanent German political control. Largely for these reasons, no strong monarchies emerged as they did in the rest of Europe. Authority of the Holy Roman Empire over northern Italian territory, especially after the year 1177, was de facto only nominal. Instead emerged the autonomous (sometimes de facto independent) city-states.

While those Roman, urban, republican sensibilities persisted, there were many movements and changes afoot. Italy first felt the changes in Europe from the 11th to the 13th centuries. Typically there was:

- a rise in population―the population doubled in this period (the demographic explosion)
- an emergence of huge cities (Venice, Florence and Milan had over 100,000 inhabitants by the 13th century in addition to many others such as Genoa, Bologna and Verona, which had over 50,000 inhabitants)
- the rebuilding of the great cathedrals
- substantial migration from country to city (in Italy the rate of urbanization reached 20%, making it the most urbanized society in the world at that time)
- an agrarian revolution
- the development of commerce

== Income ==
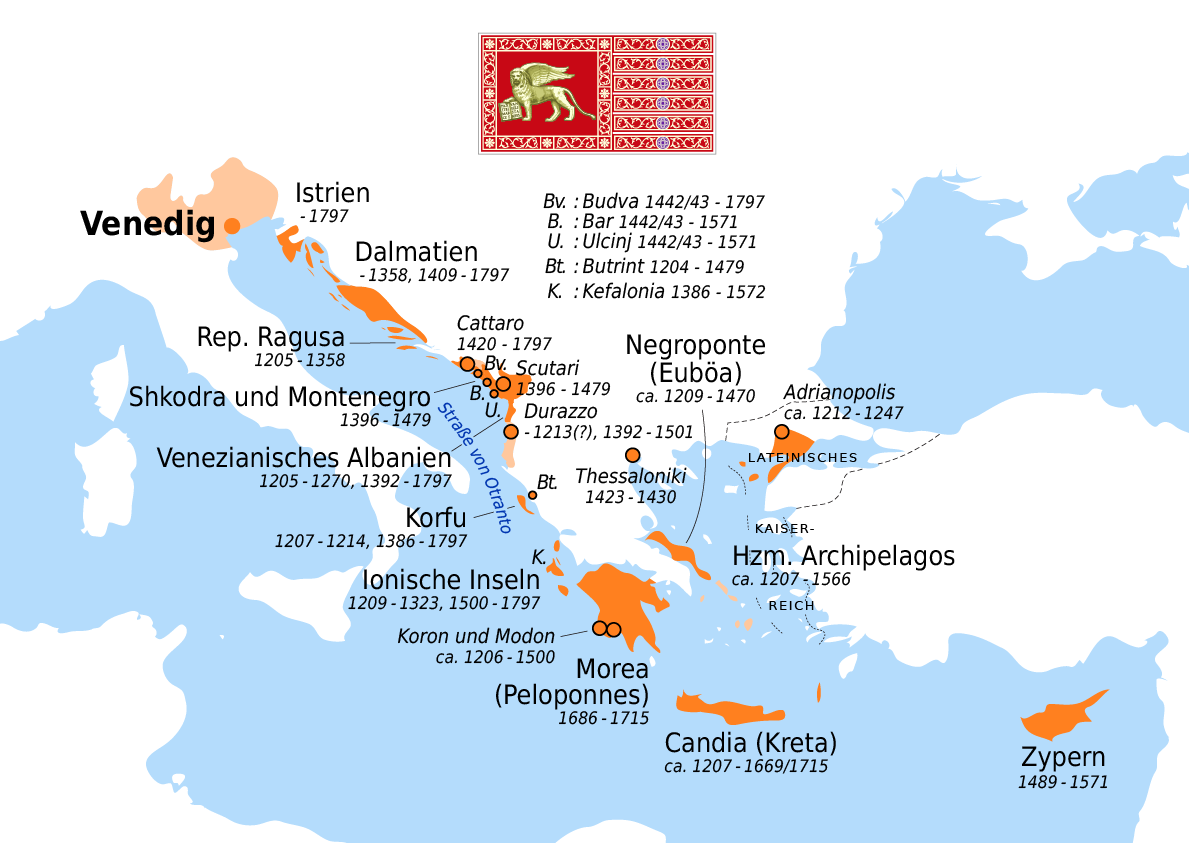
The Republic of Venice used to be a city-state, but then expanded and conquered several territories in mainland Italy (Domini di Terraferma) and abroad (Stato da Màr).

It is estimated that the per capita income of northern Italy nearly tripled from the 11th century to the 15th century. This was a highly mobile, demographically expanding society, fueled by rapidly expanding commerce.

In the 14th century, just as the Italian Renaissance was beginning, Italy was the economic capital of Western Europe: the Italian States were the top manufacturers of finished woolen products. With the Bubonic Plague in 1348, the birth of the English woolen industry, and general warfare, Italy temporarily lost its economic advantage. By the late 15th century Italy was again in control of trade along the Mediterranean Sea. It found a new niche in luxury items like ceramics, glassware, lace and silk as well as experiencing a temporary rebirth in the woolen industry.

Italy never regained its strong hold on textiles. Though it was the birthplace of banking, by the 16th century German and Dutch banks began taking away business. The discovery of the Americas as well as new trade routes to Africa and India by the Portuguese, which made Portugal the leading trading power, brought about the shift of economic power from Italy to Portugal in the 16th century, from Portugal to the Netherlands in the 17th century, and from the Netherlands to the United Kingdom in the 18th century.

== Literacy and numeracy ==
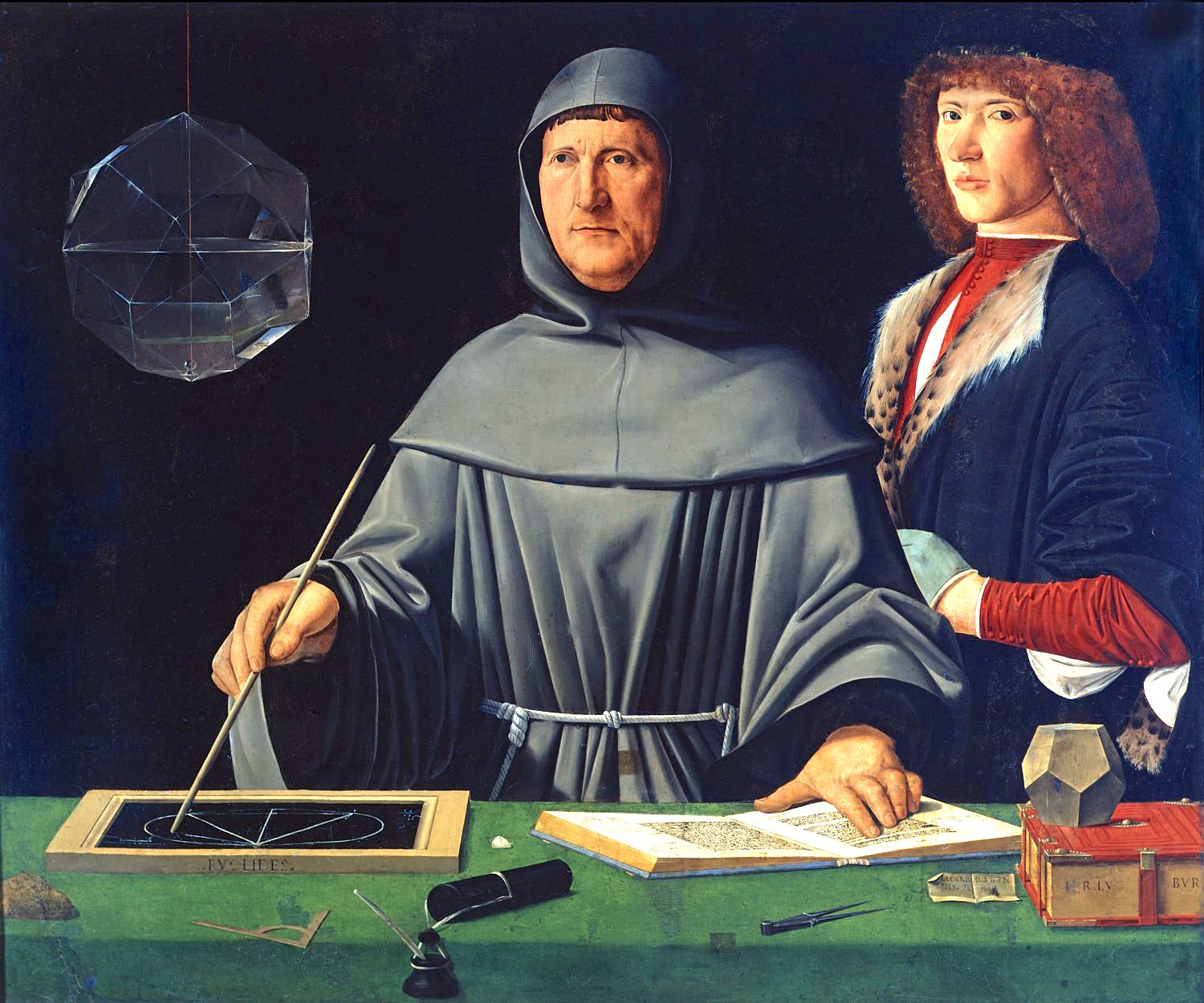
Portrait of the Italian Luca Pacioli, painted by Jacopo de' Barbari, 1495, (Museo di Capodimonte). Pacioli is regarded as the Father of Accounting.

By the 13th century, northern and central Italy had become the most literate society in the world. More than one-third of the male population could read in the vernacular (an unprecedented rate since the decline of the Western Roman Empire), as could a small but significant proportion of women.

The Italian city states were also highly numerate, given the importance of the new forms of bookkeeping that were essential to the trading and mercantile basis of society. Some of the most widely circulating books, such as the Liber Abaci by Leonardo Fibonacci of Pisa, included applications of mathematics and arithmetic to business practice or were business manuals based on sophisticated numeracy.

Indeed, Luca Pacioli helped create the banking system of the Italian city-states with double-entry bookkeeping. His 27-page treatise on bookkeeping contained the first known published work on that topic, and is said to have laid the foundation for double-entry bookkeeping (of Genoese merchants) as it is practised today.

== Communes ==
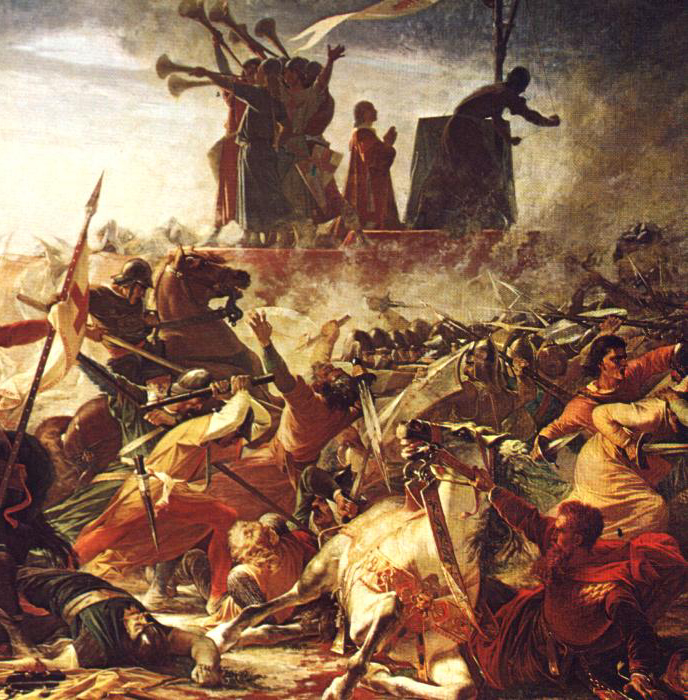
The defence of the Carroccio during the battle of Legnano (1176) by Amos Cassioli (1832–1891)

During the 11th century in northern Italy a new political and social structure emerged: the city-state or commune. The civic culture which arose from this urbs was remarkable. In some places where communes arose (e.g. Britain and France), they were absorbed by the monarchical state as it emerged. They survived in northern and central Italy as in a handful of other regions throughout Europe to become independent and powerful city-states.

In Italy the breakaway from their feudal overlords occurred in the late 12th century and 13th century, during the Investiture Controversy between the Pope and the Holy Roman Emperor: Milan led the Lombard cities against the Holy Roman Emperors and defeated them, gaining independence (battles of Legnano, 1176, and Parma, 1248; see Lombard League).

Some Italian city-states became great military powers very early on. Venice and Genoa acquired vast naval empires in the Mediterranean and Black Seas, some of which threatened those of the growing Ottoman Empire. During the Fourth Crusade (1204), Venice conquered three-eights of the Byzantine Empire.

The Maritime Republics were one of the main products of this new civic and social culture based on commerce and exchange of knowledge with other areas of the world outside western Europe. The Republic of Venice and the Republic of Genoa for example, had important trade communications with the Muslim and Byzantine world and this helped the initial development of the Italian Renaissance.

By the late 12th century, a new and remarkable society had emerged in Northern Italy; rich, mobile, expanding, with a mixed aristocracy and urban borghese (burgher) class, interested in urban institutions and republican government. But many of the new city-states also housed violent factions based on family, confraternity and brotherhood, which undermined their cohesion (for instance the Guelphs and Ghibellines).

== Princely states ==
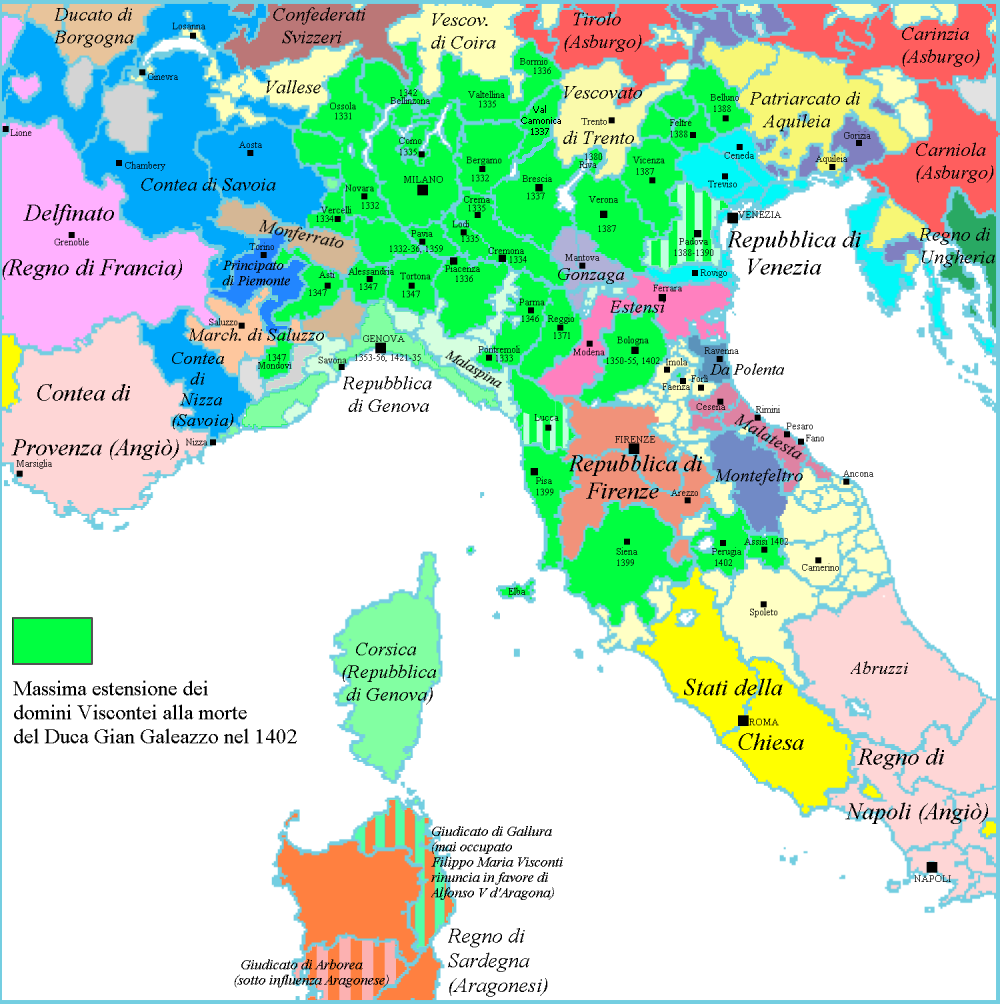
The Duchy of Milan and the domains of the Visconti (marked in bright green) at the beginning of the 15th century, at their maximum territorial extent, under Duke Gian Galeazzo Visconti

By 1300, most of these republics had become princely states dominated by a signore (or lord). The exceptions were the Republics of Venice, Florence, Genoa, Lucca, and a few others, which remained republics in the face of an increasingly monarchic Europe. In many cases by 1400 the Signori were able to found a stable dynasty over their dominated city (or group of regional cities), obtaining a nobility title of sovereignty by their formal superior. For example in 1395 Gian Galeazzo Visconti bought the title of Duke of Milan from the King Wenceslaus for 100,000 gold florins.

== Regional states ==
In the fourteenth and fifteenth centuries, Milan, Venice, and Florence were able to conquer other city-states, creating regional states. The 1454 Peace of Lodi ended their struggle for hegemony in Italy, attaining a balance of power (see Italian Renaissance).

At the beginning of the 16th century, apart from some city-states like Genoa, Lucca or San Marino, only the Republic of Venice was able to preserve its independence and to match the European monarchies of France and Spain and the Ottoman Empire (see Italian Wars).

== See also ==
- History of Italy
- Medieval commune
- Repubbliche Marinare
- Guelphs and Ghibellines
- Italian Renaissance
- San Marino
- Vatican City
- List of historic states of Italy
