= Plato's political philosophy =

Political views of Greek philosopher

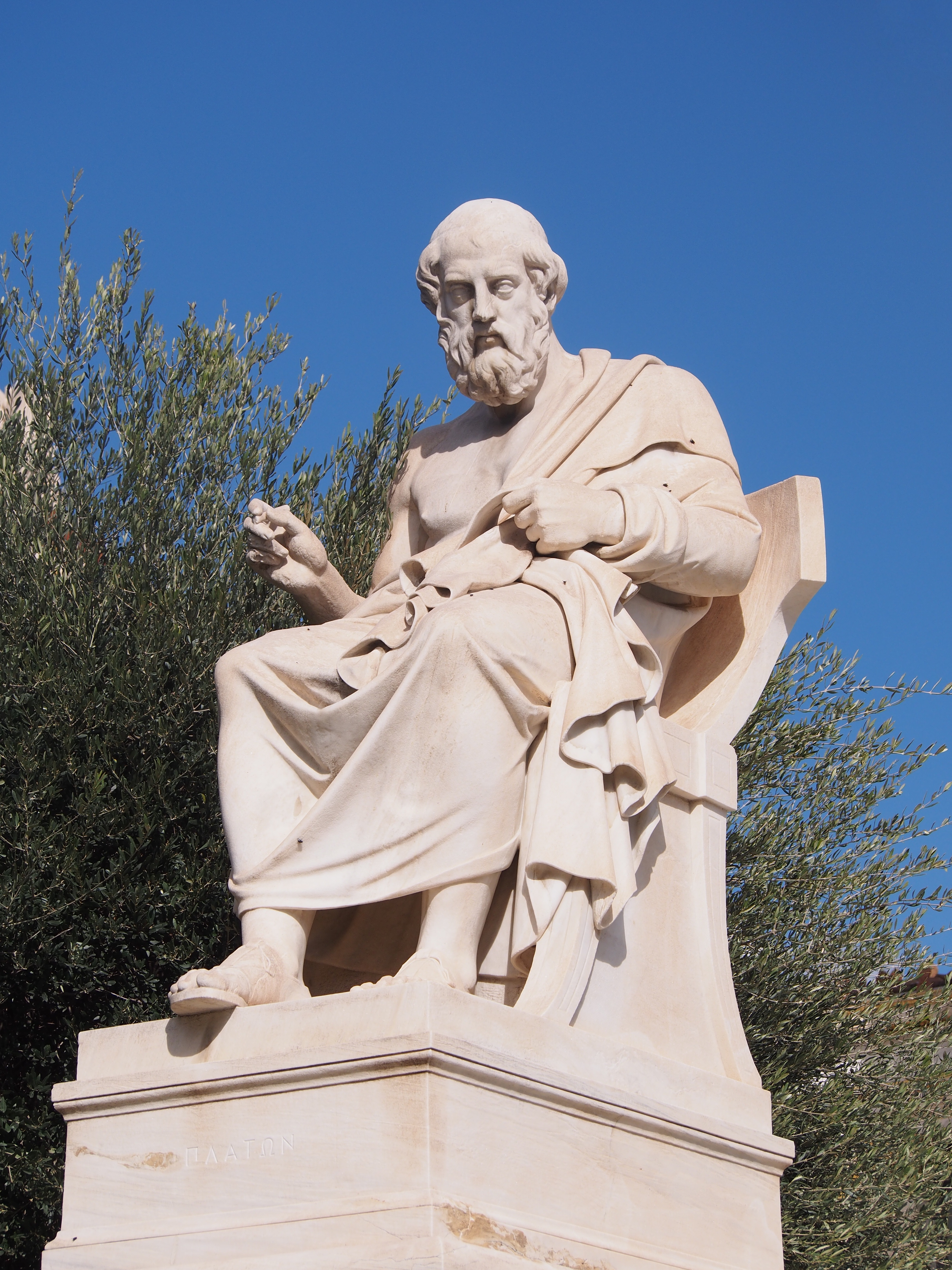
Statue of Plato

In Plato's Republic, the character of Socrates is highly critical of democracy and instead proposes, as an ideal political state, a hierarchal system of three classes: philosopher-kings or guardians who make the decisions, soldiers or "auxiliaries" who protect the society, and producers who create goods and do other work. Despite the title Republic (in Ancient Greek Politeia—Πολιτεία—and then translated through Latin into English), Plato's characters do not propose a republic in the modern English sense of the word.

== Criticism of democracy ==
In the Republic, Plato's Socrates raises a number of criticisms of democracy. He claims that democracy is a danger due to excessive freedom. He also argues that, in a system in which everyone has a right to rule, all sorts of selfish people who care nothing for the people but are only motivated by their own personal desires are able to attain power. He concludes that democracy risks bringing dictators, tyrants, and demagogues to power. He also claims that democracies have leaders without proper skills or morals and that it is quite unlikely that the best equipped to rule will come to power. In the Laws, Plato advanced a critique of democracy by grounding political authority in divine reason rather than popular will, presenting human law as an expression of a higher, god-given order that implicitly legitimized hierarchical governance and the leadership of a cultivated elite over mass rule.

=== Ship of State ===
Plato, through the character of Socrates, gives an analogy related to democracy: he asks us to imagine a ship whose owner surpasses all those on the ship in height and strength, but is slightly deaf; his vision is similarly impaired, and his knowledge of navigation is just as bad. He then asks us to imagine the sailors, all of whom are arguing about which of them should have control of the helm while none have studied navigation. The sailors don't even know that the craft of navigation existed. All of the sailors try to convince the owner to hand over control of the ship to them, and whichever convinces him becomes the navigator representing a philosopher-king.

== The ideal form of governance ==
In the Republic, the character of Socrates outlines an ideal city-state which he calls 'Kallipolis' (beautiful city).

=== Classes in ideal society ===
Plato lists three classes in his ideal society.

1. Producers or workers: the laborers who make the goods and services in society.
2. Auxiliaries: soldiers who protect the society.
3. Guardians: those who keep order in the society: the Philosopher Kings and Queens.

=== Philosopher-kings/Guardians ===
Plato's ideal rulers are philosopher-kings. Not only are they the most wise, but they are also virtuous and selfless. To combat corruption, Plato's Socrates suggests that the rulers would live simply and communally. Contrary to societal values at the time, Socrates suggests that sex should not be a factor in deciding who should rule, so women as well as men can rule. Socrates proposes that the Guardians should mate and reproduce, and that the children will be raised communally rather than by their biological parents. The children's biological parents will never be known to them, so that no Guardian will prefer his or her own offspring over the common good. The children of the guardian class will be tested, and only the most wise and virtuous will become rulers.
