= Social Psychology (journal) =

- Discipline: Social psychology
- Language: English
- Edited by: Kai Epstude

Publication details
- Former name: Zeitschrift für Sozialpsychologie
- History: 1970–present
- Publisher: Hogrefe Publishing
- Frequency: Bimonthly
- Open access: Hybrid
- Impact factor: 2.602 (2016)

Standard abbreviations
- ISO 4: Soc. Psychol.

Indexing
- Social Psychology
- ISSN: 1864-9335 (print); 2151-2590 (web)
- LCCN: 2008235603
- OCLC no.: 645349113
- Zeitschrift für Sozialpsychologie
- ISSN: 0044-3514

Links
- Journal homepage; Online access; Zeitschrift für Sozialpsychologie

Social Psychology is a peer-reviewed academic journal covering research in social psychology. It focuses on empirical contributions to the field.

== History ==
Social Psychology was established in 1970 as the Zeitschrift für Sozialpsychologie by Hubert Feger, Carl Friedrich Graumann, Klaus Holzkamp, and Martin Irle. Its publishing language was German, and the journal was published by Verlag Hans Huber (Bern, Switzerland). In the second half of the 1980s, the founding editors were successively replaced and terms have since been limited to about four years. In the year 2000, the journal adopted English as a second publishing language, which became the sole publishing language in 2008 when the journal moved to Hogrefe Publishing and its title was changed to Social Psychology. Previous editors-in-chief include Gerd Bohner (Bielefeld University), Hans-Peter Erb (Helmut Schmidt University), and Christian Unkelbach (University of Cologne). Since spring 2016, Kai Epstude (University of Groningen) is the editor-in chief.
