= Böckenförde dilemma =

Problem in political thought

The Böckenförde Dilemma (German: Böckenförde-Diktum) refers to how secular governments derive their authority from citizen support, but lack the uniformity of purpose found in absolutist states that can more reliably create social capital—due to the varied and fluctuating dispositions within pluralistic societies.

The dilemma is named after German constitutional judge Ernst-Wolfgang Böckenförde.

== Content ==
Böckenförde wrote that:

The liberal (German "freiheitlich"), secularized state lives by prerequisites which it cannot guarantee itself. This is the great adventure it has undertaken for freedom's sake. As a liberal state it can endure only if the freedom it bestows on its citizens takes some regulation from the interior, both from a moral substance of the individuals and a certain homogeneity of society at large. On the other hand, it cannot by itself procure these interior forces of regulation, that is not with its own means such as legal compulsion and authoritative decree. Doing so, it would surrender its liberal character (German "Freiheitlichkeit") and fall back, in a secular manner, into the claim of totality it once led the way out of, back then in the confessional civil wars.

— Ernst-Wolfgang Böckenförde, Staat, Gesellschaft, Freiheit. 1976, S. 60.

In an absolute monarchy the king represents the ultimate power based on the divine right doctrine. Thus, the legitimacy of king's rule is transcendentally justified. In a democracy there is no generally valid notion of sovereign, although in theory the people have sovereignty (popular sovereignty). But according to constitution the people hand over to some extent their sovereignty or government authority to state leaders and parliaments. In election coverage formulations like "the sovereign has decided" are used. The Böckenförde Dilemma alludes to the fact that in a democracy the legitimacy of the government is justified "from below" in contrast to absolutism. While the absolutist state demands loyalty from its citizens and through this loyalty can exercise its rule, the democratic state relies on democratic convictions of its citizens and cannot enforce those convictions itself.

This leads to difficulties in answering the question of how a democratically constituted society can secure its survival and defend itself against threats. Böckenförde draws attention to the paradox that the state in the attempt to defend democracy with "the means of legal coercion and decrees from authority" would itself become a dictatorship because it would infringe upon the idea of people as sovereign.

Gerhard Czermak writes that Böckenförde is "fundamentally misunderstood when not instrumentalized" when it is concluded from his dilemma that "the state should promote churches and religious communities as sources of virtue in particular... He (Böckenförde) speaks of adventure and points to very different forces acting in society. He means that all groups with their own, also moral, worldview contribute to integration of a part of society."

In two interviews in 2009 and 2010 Böckenförde answered the critique that he had exaggerated the ethical force of religion: "This criticism misses the context in which I made this statement in 1964. Back then I was trying to explain to Catholics the origin of the secular, that is worldly, no longer religious state and dissolve their scepticism of it. This had happened before 1965 when at the end of the Second Vatican Council the Roman Catholic Church for the first time completely recognized the concept of religious freedom. In the face of this scepticism I urged Catholics to accept this state and engage in it, among other things with the argument that the state has to rely on their ethical shaping force."

In 2010 Böckenförde clarified it as follows: "To conceive of such a state the liberal order needs a unifying ethos, a "sense of community" among those who live in this state. The question then becomes: what is creating this ethos, which can neither be enforced by the state nor compelled by a sovereign? One can say: first the common culture. But what are the elements and factors of that culture? Then indeed we are dealing with its sources such as Christianity, Enlightenment and humanism. But not automatically any religion."

A secular version of this thought one can find already in Aristotle: that the virtue of a state is founded on the virtue of its citizens and that it rests on their disposition, habit and reason, which is also reflected in the famous quote of Joseph de Maistre that every nation gets the government it deserves. Therefore political education becomes a necessary condition for existence and an essential task (however hard it is to ensure institutionally) of the good political order.

== Criticism ==
In this context the debate over changing values is worth noting. In the tradition of cultural pessimism Elisabeth Noelle-Neumann believes that since the 60's an uninterrupted decline in values has taken place. The erosion of "civic virtues" such as sense of community and pride in work as well as declining attendance in churches and shrinking religious engagement have been noted as symptoms. According to Helmut Klages instead of a decay of values what is happening is a synthesis of old and new values. Ronald Inglehart postulates a change from material to non-material values that will ultimately strengthen democracy: he believes more cooperation and more freedom will result from this change.

Gerhard Himmelman points out that the sociologists countered the debate about a decline in values with the argument that "the modern social regulatory mechanisms and the democratic procedures serve as foundations of social integration". Instead of appealing, among other things, to the communitarianism, the public discourse, the communication free from domination (Jürgen Habermas) creates out of itself ("Selbstschöpfungsprozess") the values and behaviors (democratic virtues), that the liberal state needs to exist and survive. Jürgen Habermas also sees a risk that runaway modernization of society undermines the democratic layer and destroys the kind of solidarity on which the democratic state relies, without being able to enforce it legally.

Michael Haus also rejects the Böckenförde thesis as unfounded. From Böckenförde's premise that the modern democratic state was created under the influence of the Christian religion, it does not necessarily follow that the society of today is dependent on religion as a foundation. Instead a civic consensus could also rest on binding commonalities such as shared interests, interdependencies, dependencies, opportunities for cooperation, a common history or common historical lessons.

Axel Montenbruck follows Böckenförde's approach. But answering Böckenförde's call for "binding ethos" Montenbruck introduces the western secular ideas of civil religion that goes back to Rousseau: "The solution to this dilemma can only be found on an even higher level, such as that of the preambles. The people needs to create aside from the state also its own "substitute religion of internalized values and principles", to which it must then submit. Indeed, the nations possess these "substitute religions" as evidenced by preambles to their constitutions etc. But they find an understandable difficulty speaking again of religion, even if only of civil religion."

== Effect ==
Since the 1990s, this idea has been taken up and modified by Paul Kirchhof and related to demographic developments.

The Böckenförde dilemma stands at the "center of liberal conservatism".

== See also ==
- Citizenship education
- Civic education
