= Franz Herre =

German biographer, historian and journalist (1926–2026)

- Born: 11 April 1926; Fischen im Allgäu, Bavaria, Germany
- Died: 3 January 2026 (aged 99)
- Occupations: Biographer, historian and journalist

Franz Herre (11 April 1926 – 3 January 2026) was a German biographer, historian and journalist.

== Life and career ==
Herre grew up in Augsburg and studied history at the Ludwig-Maximilians-Universität München, receiving his doctorate in 1949, supervised by Franz Schnabel and with a dissertation on the Augsburg middle-classes during the Age of Enlightenment. He then worked as a journalist on the Augsburger Allgemeine and Rheinischer Merkur for several years. From 1962 to 1981, he was editor-in-chief of the Deutsche Welle in Cologne. He later worked as a freelance writer in Herrsching am Ammersee.

Herre died on 3 January 2026, at the age of 99.

== Works ==
=== Biographies ===
- Freiherr vom Stein: sein Leben, seine Zeit, Köln 1973.
- Kaiser Franz Joseph von Österreich: sein Leben, seine Zeit, Köln 1978.
- Kaiser Wilhelm I.: der letzte Preuße, Köln 1980.
- Radetzky: eine Biographie, Köln 1981.
- Metternich: Staatsmann des Friedens, Köln 1983.
- Moltke: der Mann und sein Jahrhundert, Stuttgart 1984.
- Ludwig II. von Bayern: sein Leben – sein Land – seine Zeit, Stuttgart 1986.
- Kaiser Friedrich III.: Deutschlands liberale Hoffnung, eine Biographie, Stuttgart 1987.
- Montgelas: Gründer des bayerischen Staates, Weilheim 1988.
- Napoleon Bonaparte: Wegbereiter des Jahrhunderts, München 1988.
- Napoleon III.: Glanz und Elend des Zweiten Kaiserreiches, München 1990.
- Bismarck: der preußische Deutsche, Köln 1991.
- Kaiser Wilhelm II.: Monarch zwischen den Zeiten, Köln 1993.
- Maria Theresia: die große Habsburgerin, Köln 1994.
- Marie Louise: Napoleon war ihr Schicksal, Köln 1996.
- Prinz Eugen: Europas heimlicher Herrscher, Stuttgart 1997.
- George Washington: Präsident an der Wiege einer Weltmacht, Stuttgart 1999.
- Eugénie: Kaiserin der Franzosen, Stuttgart 2000.
- Joséphine: Kaiserin an Napoleons Seite, Regensburg 2003.
- Napoleon Bonaparte: eine Biografie, überarbeitete Neuausgabe, Regensburg 2003.
- Marie Antoinette: vom Königsthron zum Schafott, Stuttgart u.a. 2004.
- Ludwig I.: ein Romantiker auf Bayerns Thron, Stuttgart u.a. 2005.
- Kaiserin Friedrich: Victoria, eine Engländerin in Deutschland, Stuttgart u.a. 2005.
- Friedrich Wilhelm IV.: der andere Preußenkönig, Gernsbach 2007.

=== Monographs ===
- Das Augsburger Bürgertum im Zeitalter der Aufklärung, in Reihe: Abhandlungen zur Geschichte der Stadt Augsburg; H. 6, Diss. 1949, Augsburg u.a. 1952.
- Nation ohne Staat: Die Entstehung der deutschen Frage, Kiepenheuer & Witsch, Köln-Berlin 1967.
- Anno 70/71: Ein Krieg, ein Reich, ein Kaiser, Köln 1970; ISBN 3-763214-68-2.
- Die amerikanische Revolution: Geburt einer Weltmacht, Köln 1976; ISBN 3-404640-53-5.
- Deutsche und Franzosen: der lange Weg zur Freundschaft, Bergisch Gladbach 1983; ISBN 3-785703-59-7.
- Die Fugger in ihrer Zeit, Wißner Verlag, Augsburg 12. Auflage 2009 ISBN 3-89639-490-8.
- Die Geschichte Frankreichs. Geschrieben von Franz Herre und in Bildern erzählt von Erich Lessing, C. Bertelsmann Verlag, München 1989; ISBN 3-570075-83-4.

=== Other ===
- Bibliographie zur Zeitgeschichte und zum zweiten Weltkrieg für die Jahre 1945–1950, (edited with Hellmuth Auerbach) München 1955.
- Paris: Ein historischer Führer vom Mittelalter bis zur Belle Epoque, Köln 1972.
- Der vollkommene Feinschmecker: Einführung in die Kunst des Geniessens, Düsseldorf 1977.
- Wien: historische Spaziergänge, Köln 1992.
- A wie Adenauer: Erinnerungen an die Anfänge der Bonner Republik, Stuttgart 1997.
- Jahrhundertwende 1900: Untergangsstimmung und Fortschrittsglauben, Stuttgart 1998.
- Rom: historische Spaziergänge, Köln 1999.
- Am liebsten Pasta mit Trüffeln: ein Genießer unterwegs, München u.a. 2001. ISBN 3-7338-0310-8

== Sources ==
- "DNB, Katalog der Deutschen Nationalbibliothek". portal.dnb.de.
