= Benjamin Evans Lippincott =

American political scientist and professor

Benjamin Evans Lippincott (1902 – 10 November 1988) was an American academic who was Professor of Political Science at the University of Minnesota.

He studied at Yale, Oxford, and the London School of Economics where he earned a PhD in 1930 under Harold Laski. He joined the University of Minnesota in 1929.

During the Second World War, from 1943 to 1945 he served overseas as historian of the Thirteenth Air Force in the South Pacific and earned the Legion of Merit. After the war he was reserve officer, attaining the rank of colonel.

He was married to Gertrude Lawton.

== Books ==
- Government Control of the Economic Order (1935, editor)
- On the Economic Theory of Socialism (1938, with Lange and Taylor)
- Victorian Critics of Democracy: Carlyle, Ruskin, Arnold, Stephen, Maine, Lecky (1938)
- From Fiji Through The Philippines With The Thirteenth Air Force (1948)
- Democracy's Dilemma: Freedom to Destroy Freedom (1965)
