= Citizenship education =

Citizenship education may refer to:

- Citizenship education (immigrants), education intended to prepare noncitizens to become legally and socially accepted as citizens
- Citizenship education (subject), a subject taught in schools, similar to politics or sociology
