= Hans Julius Wolff =

German jurist (1898–1976)

Hans Julius Wolff (1898–1976) was a German jurist. He taught at Herder Institute Riga.
