= Stefan Herre (politician) =

German politician (born 1992)

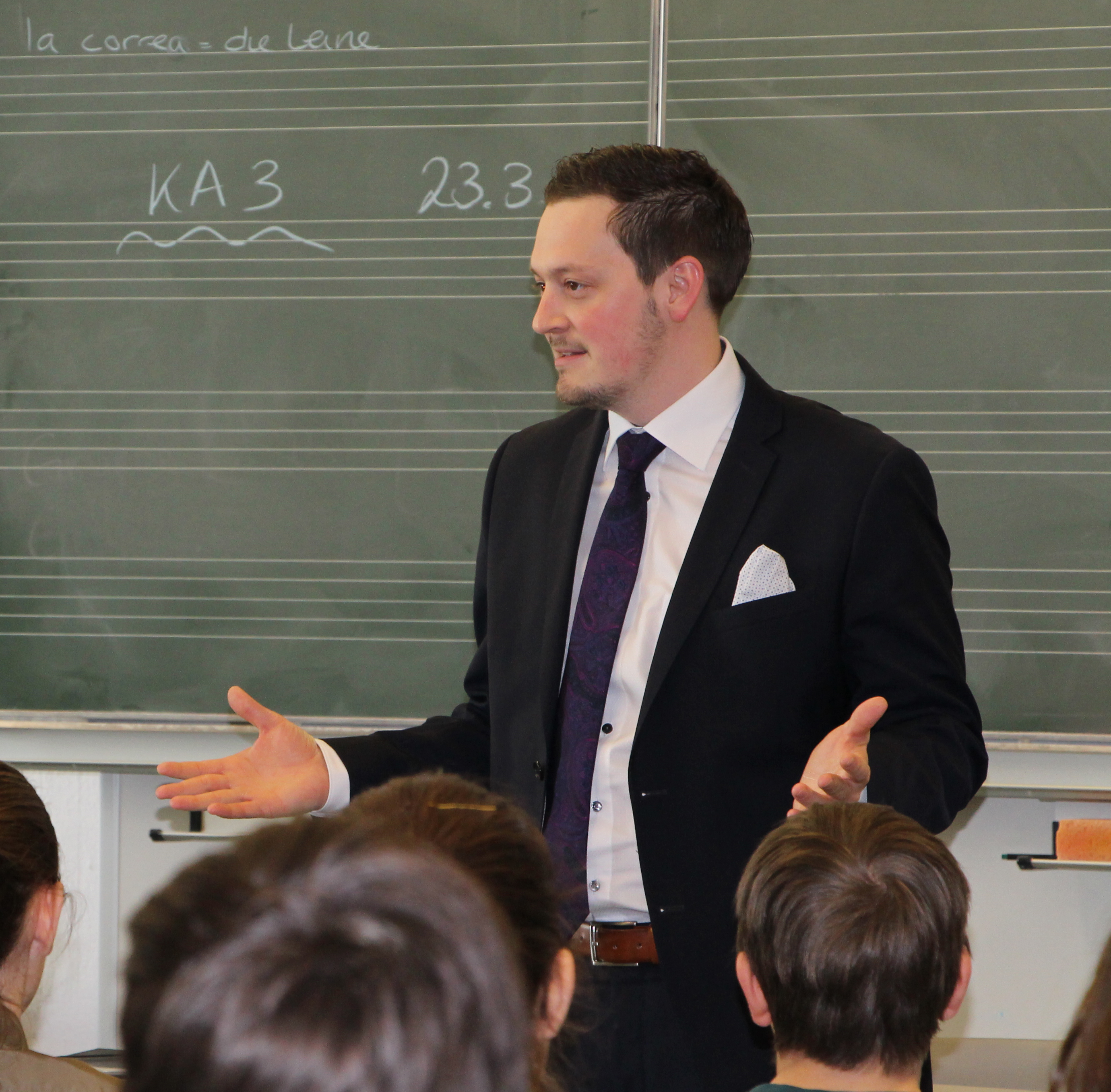
- Herre in 2017

Member of the Landtag of Baden-Württemberg
- In office 11 May 2016 – 30 April 2021

Personal details
- Born: 1992 (age 33–34)
- Party: Christian Democratic Union (since 2025)
- Other political affiliations: Alternative for Germany (2013–2019)

Stefan Herre (born 1992) is a German politician. From 2016 to 2021, he was a member of the Landtag of Baden-Württemberg. He was the youngest member of the Landtag elected in the 2016 state election. He has been a member of the Christian Democratic Union since 2025, and was a member of the Alternative for Germany from 2013 to 2019.
