= Change and continuity =

Dichotomy

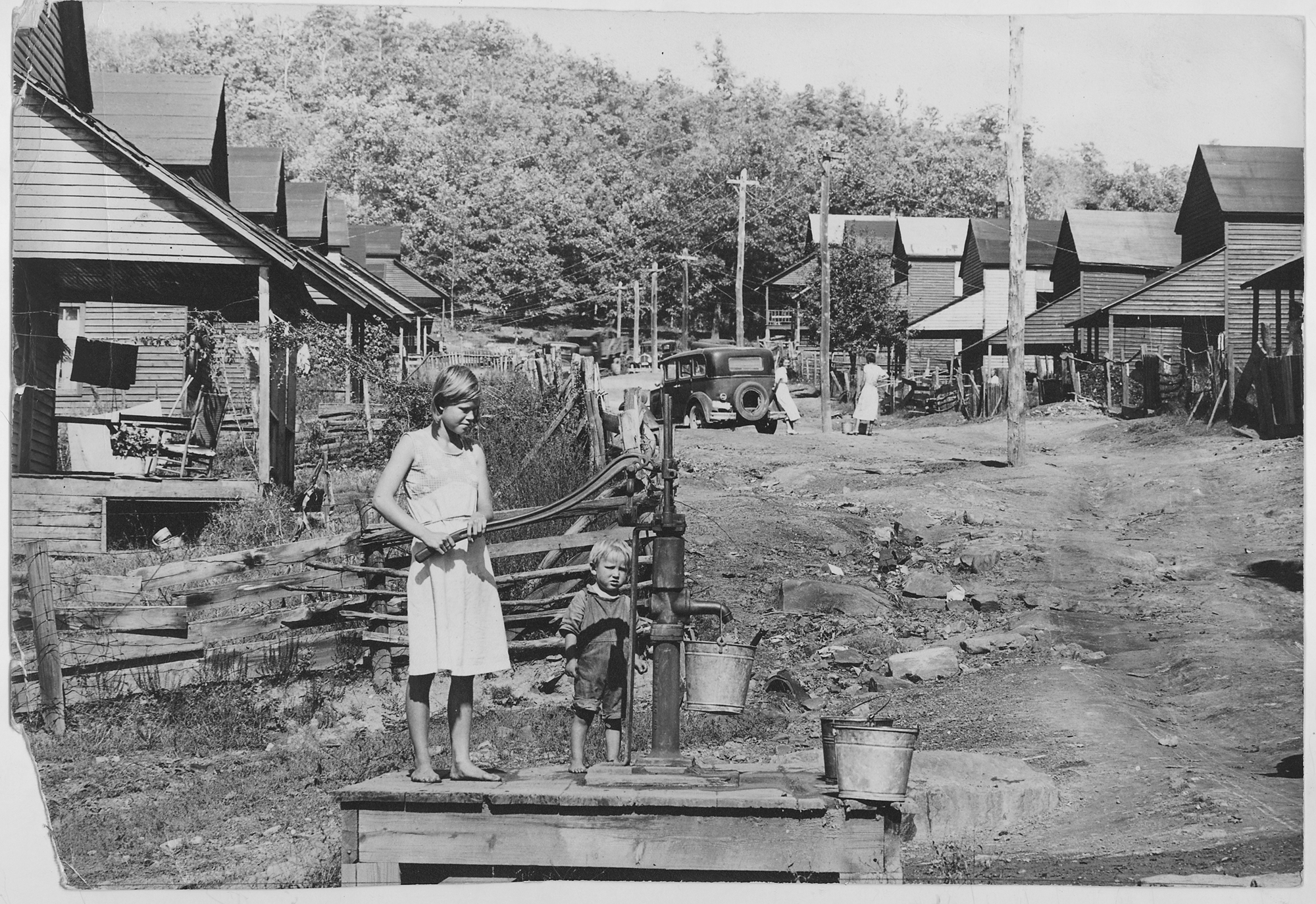
Historians have questioned whether the New Deal in the US is best seen as a decisive change or more as being a case of societal continuity in the context of American history. The picture shows two children pumping water by hand. This was the sole water supply in this section of Wilder, Tennessee in 1942)

Change and continuity is a classic dichotomy within the fields of history, historical sociology, and the social sciences more broadly. The question of change and continuity is considered a classic discussion in the study of historical developments. The dichotomy is used to discuss and evaluate the extent to which a historical development or event represents a decisive historical change or whether a situation remains largely unchanged. A good example of this discussion is the question of how much the Peace of Westphalia in 1648 represents an important change in European history. In a similar vein, historian Richard Kirkendall once questioned whether FDR's New Deal represented "a radical innovation or a continuation of earlier themes in American life?" and posed the question of whether "historical interpretations of the New Deal [should] stress change or emphasize continuity?" The issue here is if the New Deal marks something radically new (change) in US history or if the New Deal can be understood as a continuation (continuity) of tendencies in American history that were in place well before the 1930.

The dichotomy is important in relation to constructing, discussing, and evaluating historical periodizations. In terms of creating and discussing periodization (e.g. the Enlightenment or the Victorian Era,) the dichotomy can be used to assess when a period can be said to start and end, thus making the dichotomy important in relation to understanding historical chronology. Economic historian Alexander Gerschenkron has taken issue with the dichotomy, arguing that continuity "appears to mean no more than absence of change, i.e. stability." German historian Reinhart Koselleck, however, has been said to challenge this dichotomy.
