= Goethe-Gymnasium Karlsruhe =

Coordinates: 49.0033°N 8.3961°E

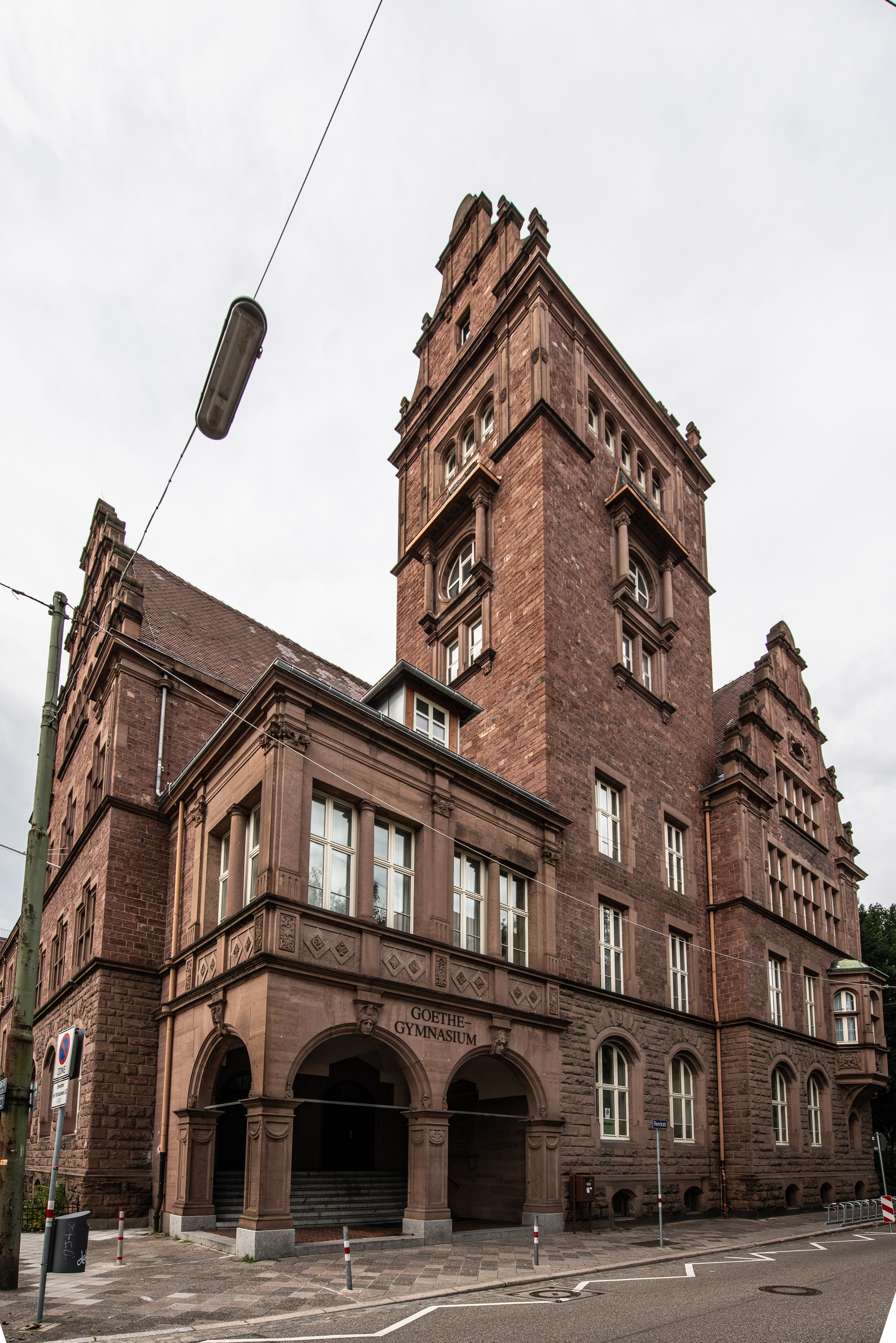

Location
- Renckstraße 2, Baden-Württemberg; 76133 Karlsruhe; Germany

Information
- Type: Gymnasium
- Established: 1908
- Principal: Albrecht Aichelin
- Faculty: 80
- Enrollment: 862
- Website: www.goethe-gymnasium-karlsruhe.de

The Goethe Gymnasium is coeducational secondary school in Karlsruhe, a town in Baden Württemberg, Germany. It is named after Johann Wolfgang von Goethe. It specialises in the natural sciences and modern languages and offers a bilingual English stream, making it unique in Karlsruhe.

== Foundation ==
Like other schools at the time the Goethe-School could not avoid Gleichschaltung (Nazification). In 1933 Ott was de facto replaced by Guido Oeß who had taught at the school since 1914, and been a Nazi Party member since 1929. Ott was formally dismissed in 1934. During World War II, the school was again used as accommodation for various organizations. It was severely damaged in 1944, by a series of allied airstrikes: especially the ones on 26/27 September and 4 December 1944.
