= Ficker =

Ficker is a surname. Notable people with the surname include:

- Desirée Ficker (born 1976), American long-distance runner
- Gunnar Ficker (born 1954), Brazilian sailor
- Heinrich von Ficker (1881–1957), German-Austrian meteorologist
- Julius von Ficker (1826–1902), German historian
- Peter Ficker (born 1951), Brazilian sailor
- Robin Ficker (born 1943), American attorney
- Rudolf von Ficker (1886–1954), Austrian musicologist
- Suzanne Farrell (born Roberta Sue Ficker), American dancer
- William P. Ficker, American sailor

== See also ==
- Sybel-Ficker controversy, a dispute in the second half of the 19th century
