= UCLA Library =

University library system in Los Angeles, California

Coordinates: 34°04′18″N 118°26′32″W

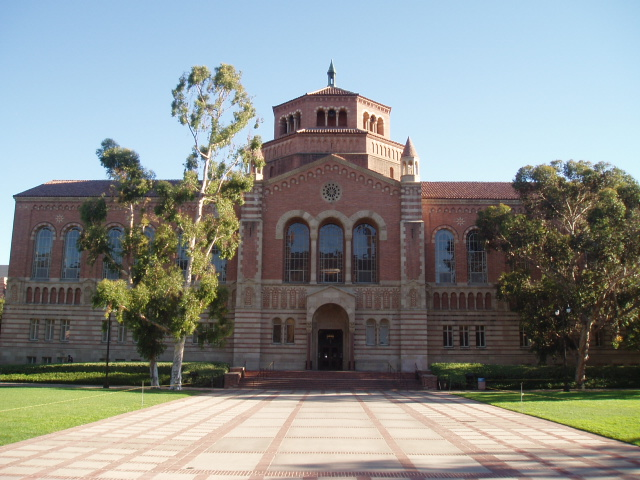
- Established: 1883
- Branches: 12 libraries; 12 other units

Collection
- Size: 12 million volumes; 950,000 ebooks; 100,000 serials; 700 subscription databases

Access and use
- Population served: 65,612 UCLA faculty, staff and students in addition to the Los Angeles metropolitan area

Other information
- Budget: $34 million annually
- Director: Athena Jackson
- Employees: 1,175 (125 librarians; 350 staff; 700 student employees)
- Website: library.ucla.edu

The University of California, Los Angeles Library (UCLA Library) is the academic library system of the University of California, Los Angeles.

The library system maintains a collection of over twelve million books and 100,000 serials. The system is spread over 12 libraries, 12 other archives, reading rooms, research centers and the Southern Regional Library Facility, which serves as a remote storage facility for southern UC campuses. Its annual budget allocates $10 million for the procurement of digital and print material. It is a Federal Depository Library, California State Depository Library, and United Nations Depository Library.

== History ==
Charles E. Young Research Library

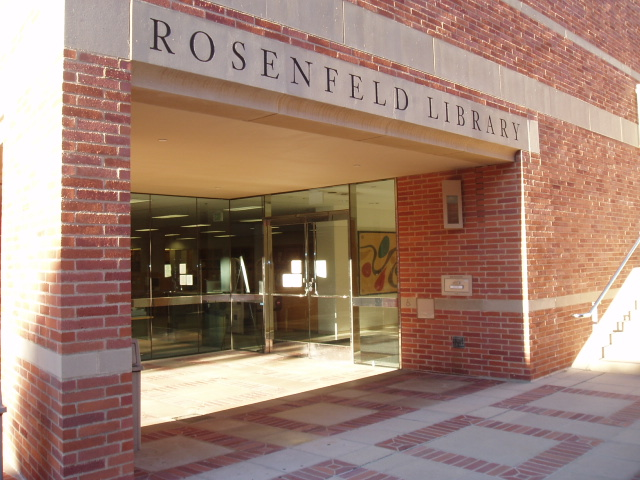
Eugene and Maxine Rosenfeld Management Library

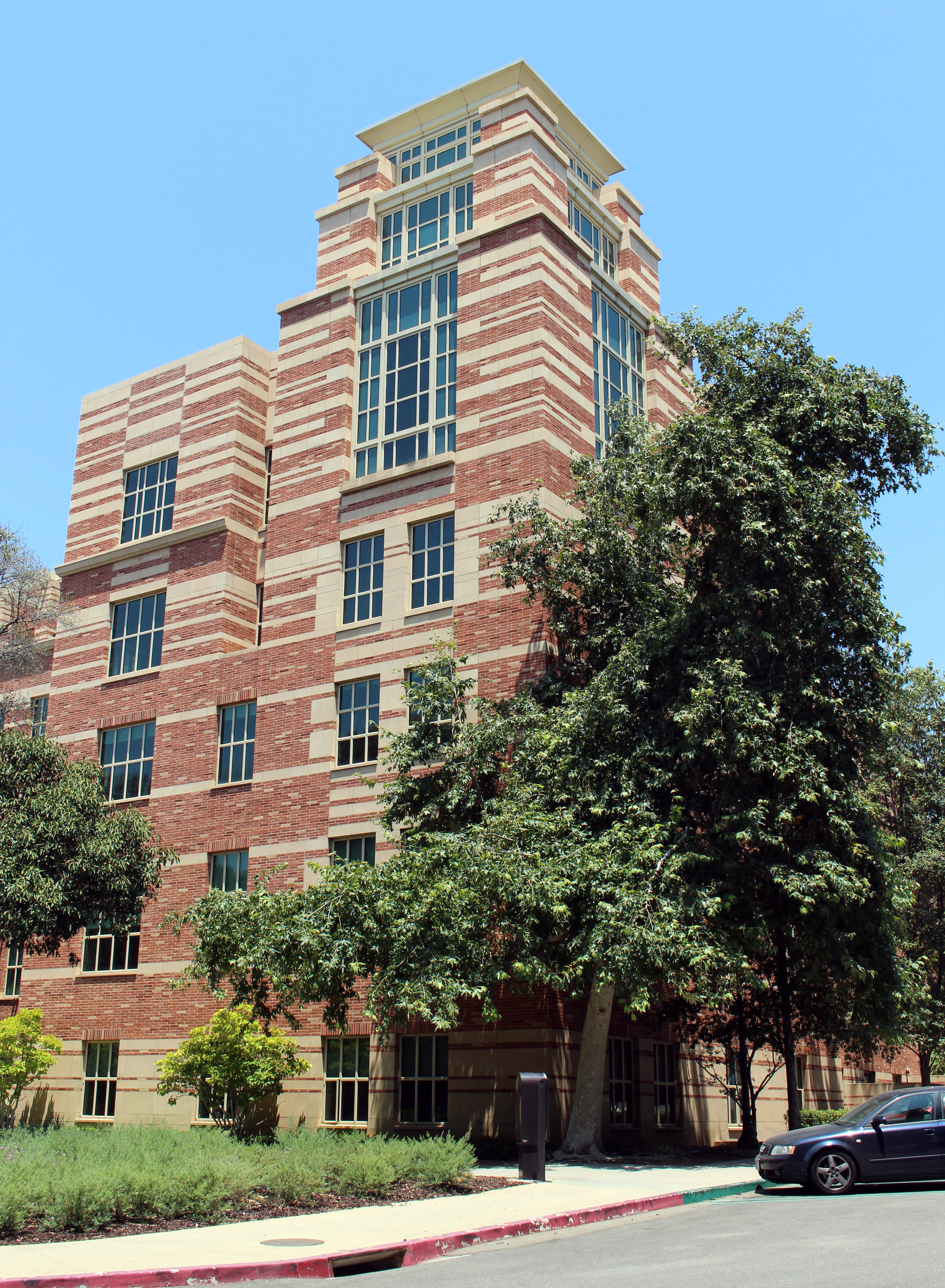
The Hugh and Hazel Darling Law Library

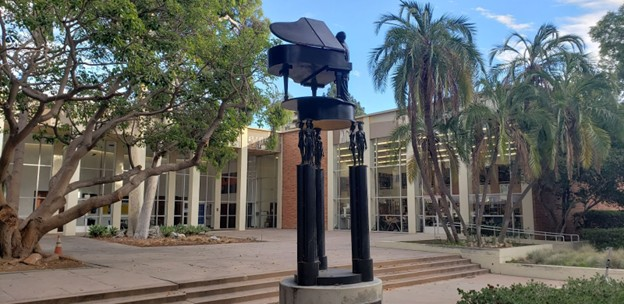
Schoenberg Music Building with the Walter H. Rubsamen Music Library

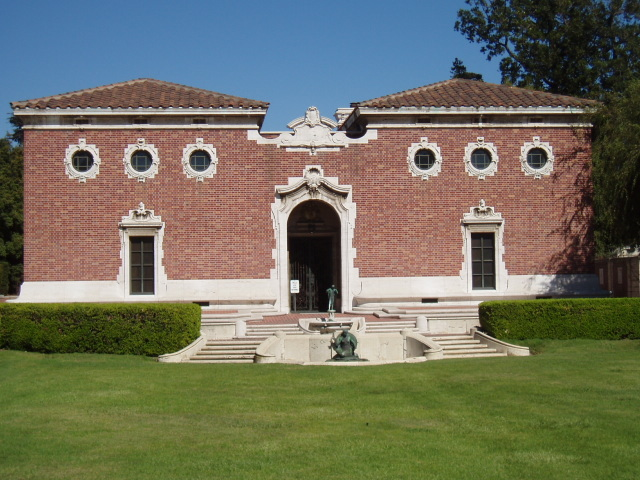
William Andrews Clark Memorial Library

=== 1883–1944: Laying a foundation ===
The University Library at Los Angeles was founded in 1883, two years after the establishment of what was then known as the California State Normal School. The library's first acquisition was Survey of Wyoming and Idaho by Dr. Ferdinand Vandeveer Hayden In 1910, Elizabeth Fargo began her tenure as the university's first librarian and by 1919, the University Library was operated by a staff of four. By 1931, the Library had collected 24,000 volumes and was ranked 36th in the country by the Princeton Library Survey.

Upon Elizabeth Fargo's retirement in 1923, John E. Goodwin took the helm as librarian for a collection of 42,000 volumes, tended to by 12 staff members. Goodwin planned for the orderly expansion of the library by the immediate reclassification of books from the Dewey Decimal System to the Library of Congress Classification System. He also opposed and eventually defeated a proposal to make the library at Los Angeles an adjunct collection of a main research library at UC Berkeley.

Starting in 1929, Goodwin oversaw the construction and development of the Main Library, which was built after the university settled in its present location in Westwood. Goodwin also saw the bequest of the William Andrews Clark Memorial Library to UCLA in 1934. In 1942, the UCLA Walter H. Rubsamen Music Library was established. By the time Goodwin retired in 1944, the Library collection had grown to 462,000 volumes, supported by 52 staff members.

=== 1944–1961: The Powell years ===
Appointed to replace Goodwin in 1944, Lawrence Clark Powell began a series of systematic changes and acquisitions meant to increase the prestige of the UCLA library system. During Powell's tenure, the Library saw a major expansion of its facilities as the central book stack was completed. During this period, a concerted effort was made to provide new or more comprehensive collections to support the academic research that was being conducted on campus. In 1956, the music library moved to a new space in the Schoenberg Music Building. In 1959, Powell was named the founding Dean of the School of Library Service (which became part of the UCLA Graduate School of Education and Information Studies), a position he would hold until 1966. Several facilities at UCLA would later be named after Powell, including the Undergraduate College Library. About his work for the UCLA libraries, Powell wrote

I saw the University Library's stock of 285,000 volumes increase to 2,000,000, the William Andrews Clark Memorial Library transformed from a bookish mausoleum to a center of biblio-scholarly activity, a staff of 35 grow to 300, a library school come into being, and UCLA become known internationally as a dynamic place of books and learning.

=== 1961–1977: Accumulation and expansion ===
Robert Vosper was hired as University Librarian in 1961, and the following year, ground was broken for the first unit of the University Research Library, now the Charles E. Young Research Library. Completed in 1964, the construction of the Research Library entailed carting approximately 4 million index cards and 14 miles of books around campus. The newly completed six-story facility then became the administrative center for the UCLA Library system. The Main Library was then converted to the College Library. By 1964, the Library ranked 11th in the country, with more than two million volumes. Having been founded only sixty years prior, the UCLA Library was on pace to becoming one of the most important libraries in the country.

Vosper was succeeded by Page Ackerman in 1973, who served as librarian until her retirement in 1977. She was the first woman in the United States to head a library system of such a scale. Ackerman saw the development of the Library's administrative network, which became an innovative model for library management systems across the country. During her tenure, Ackerman oversaw an increased coordination of efforts with the libraries of all UC campuses, a necessity that came which was initially brought about by state budget problems. Under Ackerman, the UCLA Library acquired collections on many important figures, including Ralph J. Bunche, Gertrude Stein and Anaïs Nin. In 1976, the music library was named after Walter H. Rubsamen, professor emeritus of the UCLA Department of Music.

=== 1977–present ===
Since Ackerman's retirement in 1977, UCLA has steadily increased collections, facilities and staff under librarians Russell Shank (1977–1990), Gloria Werner (1990–2002), Gary E. Strong (2003–2013), Virginia Steel (2013–2023), and Athena Jackson (2024-present). In 2020, the first major open access collection of new music, the Contemporary Music Score Collection was established by music librarian Matthew Vest. The library collection consists of more than 8 million volumes and more than 78,000 current serial titles and an aggressively expanding electronic resources collection. The UCLA Library is a member of the Association of Research Libraries, the Coalition of Networked Information, the Center for Research Libraries, the Council on Library and Information Resources, International Federation of Library Associations and Institutions, and the Scholarly Publishing and Academic Resources Coalition.

== Libraries and other collections ==
=== Primary locations ===
- Arts Library
- Charles E. Young Research Library
- Eugene and Maxine Rosenfeld Management Library
- Louise M. Darling Biomedical Library
- Powell Library
- Science and Engineering Library
- Science and Engineering Library/Geology
- Systemwide Library Facility - South
- UCLA Film & Television Archive
- UCLA Walter H. Rubsamen Music Library

=== Units in Young Research Library ===
- Richard C. Rudolph East Asian Library
- UCLA Library Data Science Center
- UCLA Library Special Collections

=== Other libraries ===
- American Indian Studies Center Library
- Asian American Studies Center Library/Reading Room
- UCLA Chicano Studies Research Center#LibraryChicano Studies Research Library
- English Reading Room
- Ethnomusicology Archive
- Gonda Family Library
- Hugh and Hazel Darling Law Library
- Ralph J. Bunche Center for African American Studies Library and Media Center
- William Andrews Clark Memorial Library
