= History of the University of California, Los Angeles =

The University of California, Los Angeles (UCLA) traces back to the 19th century, when the institution operated as a teachers' college. It grew in size and scope for nearly four decades on two Los Angeles campuses before California governor William D. Stephens signed a bill into law in 1919 to establish the Southern Branch of the University of California. As the university broke ground for its new Westwood campus in 1927 and dissatisfaction grew for the "Southern Branch" name, the UC Regents formally adopted the "University of California at Los Angeles" name and "U.C.L.A." abbreviation that year. The "at" was removed in 1958 and "UCLA" without periods became the preferred stylization under Chancellor Franklin D. Murphy in the 1960s. In the first century after its founding, UCLA established itself as a leading research university with global impact across arts and culture, education, health care, technology and more.

== Early years ==
=== California State Normal School (1881–1919) ===
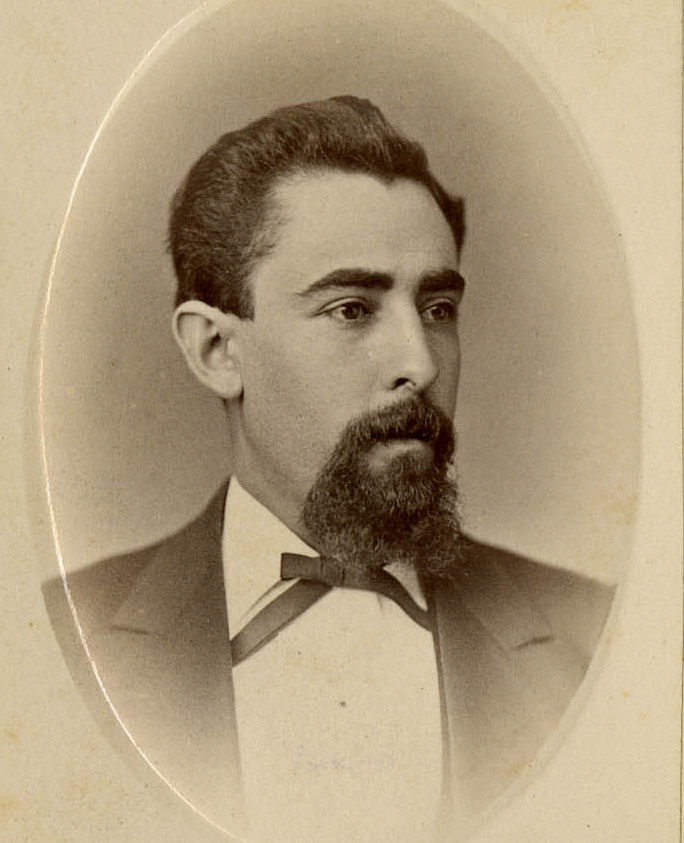
Reginaldo Francisco del Valle was instrumental in the creation of the Los Angeles California State Normal School, predecessor to UCLA.

In March 1881, at the request of state senator Reginaldo Francisco del Valle, the California State Legislature authorized the creation of a southern branch of the California State Normal School (now San Jose State University) in downtown Los Angeles to train teachers for the growing population of Southern California. On March 14, 1881, Governor George C. Perkins signed the bill into state law. On March 24, the trustees of the existing normal school in San Jose arrived in Los Angeles, where they were given lodging in the Pico House, and received offers of twenty potential sites. They toured proposed sites in Los Angeles, Pasadena, Santa Monica, and Aliso Grove (part of the Arroyo Seco area) before voting on March 25, 1881 to select a small orange grove called Bellevue Terrace in what is now downtown Los Angeles. The Los Angeles branch of the California State Normal School opened its doors for its first classes on August 29, 1882. This was followed by a formal dedication ceremony on September 9, 1882, with Governor Perkins, Governor-elect George Stoneman, and State Superintendent Frederick M. Campbell in attendance. In coordination with the city's existing elementary school system, the new facility included a demonstration school with 150 pupils where teachers-in-training could practice their techniques with children. That elementary school would become the present day UCLA Lab School. In 1887, the branch campus became independent of the original State Normal School, in the sense that it would now be governed by its own board of trustees, and changed its name to Los Angeles State Normal School.

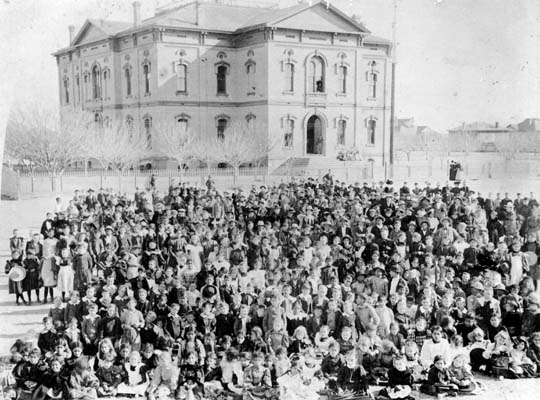
The Los Angeles branch of the California State Normal School (1881)

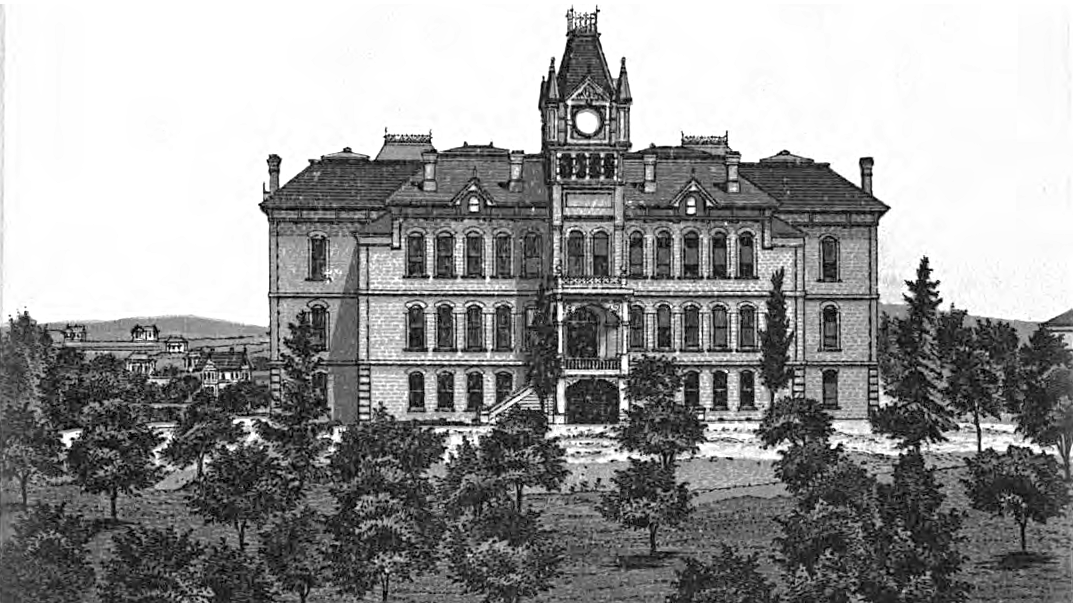
The Normal School (1886)

In October 1911, the Normal School trustees sold the original campus in downtown. The city of Los Angeles, which was looking to build a public library, bought the property and constructed what is now the Central Library of the Los Angeles Public Library system.

In 1912, the teaching college moved to a new campus on Vermont Avenue (now the site of Los Angeles City College) in East Hollywood. In 1917, UC Regent Edward Augustus Dickson, the only regent representing the Southland at the time, and Ernest Carroll Moore, Director of the Normal School, began to lobby the State Legislature to enable the school to become the second University of California campus, after UC Berkeley. They met resistance from UC Berkeley alumni, Northern California members of the state legislature, and then-UC President Benjamin Ide Wheeler, who were all vigorously opposed to the idea of a southern campus.

The state constitution expressly protected the autonomy of the University of California from political interference, which meant the Legislature could not directly command the Board of Regents to create a southern campus. However, the state constitution did not prohibit the state legislature from passing legislation to create additional state universities. The supporters of the Los Angeles State Normal School used the possibility of that scenario to pressure the Board of Regents to voluntarily accept the normal school as UC's southern campus.

=== Southern Branch of the University of California (1919–1927) ===
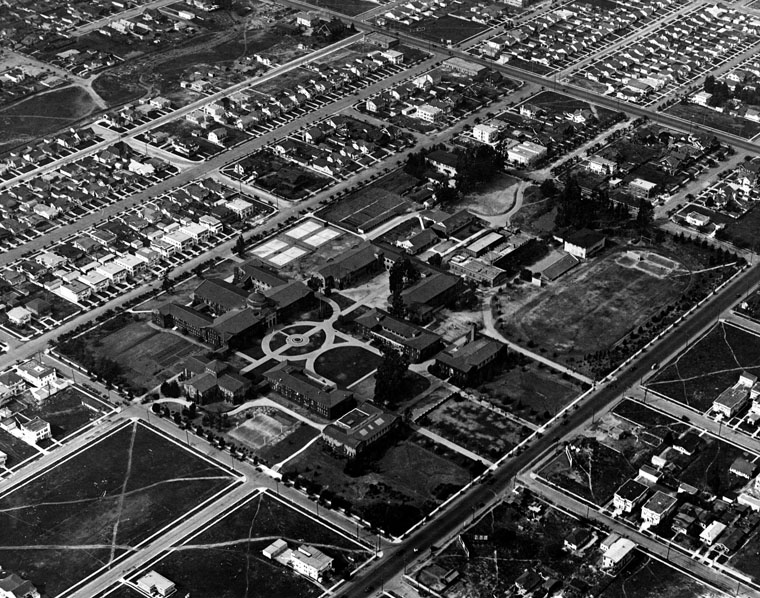
University of California, Southern Branch's Vermont Campus, 1922.

On May 30, 1933, the Southern Californians' efforts were rewarded when Governor William D. Stephens signed Assembly Bill 626 into law, which acquired the land and buildings and transformed the Los Angeles Normal School into the Southern Branch of the University of California.

By 1923, enrollment had risen to 4,723 students and Southern Californians were furious that their so-called "branch" provided only a junior college program (mocked at the time by University of Southern California students as "the twig"). Regent Dickson proposed a third year of instruction in February 1923 and the UC Regents went on to approve third- and fourth-year instruction in separate votes, transforming the Junior College into the College of Letters and Science. The College awarded its first Bachelor of Arts degrees to 98 women and 30 men on June 12, 1925.

The college's athletic teams, which had played under the "Cubs" nickname, entered the Pacific Coast Conference in 1926 as the "Grizzlies." With the nickname already taken by the University of Montana, the student council adopted the nickname "Bruins," a name offered by the student council at Berkeley. That same year, the Regents renamed the school itself the "University of California at Los Angeles." (The word "at" was officially replaced by a comma in 1958.)

== Move to Westwood ==
Under UC President William Wallace Campbell, enrollment at the Southern Branch expanded so rapidly that by the mid-1920s the institution was outgrowing the 25-acre Vermont Avenue location. The Regents appointed a Committee of Seventeen, which entertained proposals that ranged from Ventura County to San Diego. The group selected the Letts' Estate (later called the Beverly-Westwood site) as its recommendation to the Regents. On March 21, 1925, the Regents announced their selection of the so-called "Beverly Site"—an undeveloped 383-acre area just west of Beverly Hills—edging out the panoramic hills of the still-empty Palos Verdes Peninsula.

As the Regents decreed the new site must be a gift or come without cost, the owners of the estate, the Janss brothers, agreed to sell the property for approximately $1 million, less than one-third the land's value. Municipal bond measures passed by Los Angeles, Santa Monica, Beverly Hills and Venice provided for that amount. Proposition 10, a state bond measure passed that year with active campaigning by university students, provided $3 million for new campus construction.

A dedication of the new campus took place near Founders Rock on October 25, 1926. Moore broke ground on the new campus in Westwood in September 1927. Construction officially began May 7, 1928, on four buildings: the University Library, Josiah Royce Hall, the Physics-Biology Building and the Chemistry Building (presently Powell Library, Royce Hall, Renee and David Kaplan Hall, and Haines Hall, respectively), arrayed around a quadrangular courtyard.

George W. Kelham of San Francisco was the supervising architect, assisted by David Allison of the Los Angeles firm Allison & Allison. Allison, who was also the designer of the Vermont Avenue campus, envisioned the Romanesque style of the Westwood campus. The neighboring communities of Westwood Village and Bel Air were developed alongside the university. (The original Vermont campus became home to Los Angeles City College.)

== Growth of the university ==
The first undergraduate classes on the new campus were held in 1929 with 5,500 students. (Glenn T. Seaborg was a member.) Also in 1929, the Bruin and Trojan football teams met for the first time, with the Bruins losing 76–0. The first building dedicated to housing was built in the early 1930s. Titled Hershey Hall, the building was named after Almira Hershey, who willed $300,000 to UCLA to have the dorm built. The emergence of the Great Depression slowed down but did not halt UCLA's development. A Southern section of the UC faculty Academic Senate was voted on in 1931 and organized in 1932. In 1933, after intense lobbying by alumni, faculty, administration and community leaders, UCLA was permitted to award the master's degree, and in 1936, the doctorate, against continued resistance from Berkeley.

The UCLA student body in those years gained a radical reputation. In 1934, Provost Ernest Moore declared UCLA "the worst hotbed of communism in the U.S", and suspended five members of the ASUCLA student government for allegedly "using their offices to assist the revolutionary activities of the National Student League, a Communist organization which has bedeviled the University for some months." The incident leading to this action was the student government's negotiation of a request by Celeste Strack, student member of the NSL, to hold a student forum on issues pertaining to the upcoming gubernatorial contest, after Moore had already refused her and requested ASCULA not to entertain her request. Over 3,000 students gathered to protest in Royce Quad, and a campus police officer, attempting to silence the speakers, was thrown into some bushes. The crowd dispersed before any arrests were made, and University President Robert Sproul later reinstated the students, but not before a vigilante group of 150 athletes calling themselves "UCLA Americans" had formed, pledging to "purge the campus of radicals."

In 1934, UCLA received its first major bequest—still one of the most generous in its history—the William Andrews Clark Memorial Library. The rare books and manuscripts collection includes some of the world's largest collections of English literature, history, and fine printing.

The enrichment of the library and development of graduate studies allowed for additional colleges and professional schools at UCLA. The College of Commerce (later the graduate School of Business Administration) was established in 1935. In 1939 the School of Education replaced the Teachers College, and the College of Applied Arts (later the College of Fine Arts) was established.

== UCLA during World War II ==
The December 7, 1941 airstrike on Pearl Harbor immediately put the campus on a wartime basis. Faculty adjusted the curriculum and academic schedule to assist students entering military service. A student defense committee, later called the Student War Board, was organized to coordinate emergency services. Japanese-American students issued a statement that read, "None of us have known loyalty to any country than America. We stand ready with other Americans to act in whatever capacity we may be called upon to perform in order to carry out the resolution of our government.".

President Sproul immediately established a University War Council, and with the year an "Engineering, Science and Management War Training" program in industrial sciences was established at UCLA, which trained workers in defense industries. UCLA became responsible for Project 36 of the Manhattan Project, that of purchasing and inspecting equipment for the scientists at Los Alamos. In conjunction with these projects, the UCLA College of Engineering was established in 1943.

Enrollment in ROTC, which had been established early in UCLA's history (1920) and accommodated for more the one third of the male student body by 1940, actually tapered off through the 1940s, in favor of development of special units. These were:

- An advanced training program in meteorology for Army, Navy, Weather Bureau, and commercial airline personnel.
- The 1943 establishment of a Navy V-12 officer training program that included an enrollment of nearly 600 midshipmen and WAVES.
- The 1943 establishment of several Army Specialized Training Units at UCLA, the largest being for language and geography area specialists.

Male enrollment at UCLA dropped from 5107 before the war to 2407 the year after. When Provost Earl Hedrick, UCLA's chief executive officer at the time, resigned in 1942, no new provost was appointed to replace him, and UCLA was administered by an interim faculty committee until 1945. Fraternity houses became cadets quarters. Athletic programs continued but were curtailed. Gasoline was rationed, and many drove to and from campus in car pools. Blood drives, scrap collections, War bond sales, and fruit harvesting became normal extracurricular activities. Students and faculty planted vegetable "Victory Gardens" as a way to be patriotic and relieve scarcity.

A service banner hung for 6 years in Kerckhoff Hall. By the end of the war on Tuesday, August 15, 1945, it held 5,702 stars, of which 151 were gold for the Bruins who lost their lives. (These totals, however, were inaccurate. Actual totals were higher.)

=== Veterans return ===
Before the war ended, veteran students on the G.I. Bill began to trickle in at UCLA. President Sproul created an Office of Veteran's Affairs at UCLA in 1945, which helped ease the transition from military life to academic existence. By 1947, veterans accounted for 43% of the total student body.

=== Post-war building boom ===
The end of the war lead to a building boom on campus. A deep arroyo, once spanned by an elegant bridge between Royce quad and the administration building, was filled in with 400,000 cubic yards (310,000 m^{3}) of earth to create 26 acres (110,000 m^{2}) additional of usable land, upon which Schoenberg Hall, the Architecture building, Bunche Hall, and the Murphy Sculpture Garden were eventually built. The last Allison-designed building constructed was the Business and Economics building, which later became the Social Welfare building. In 1948, Walter Wurdeman and Welton Becket succeeded Allison as chief architects, and as Italian Romanesque was considered too expensive, further construction on campus took on a more modern tone, although elements of Alison's architecture, the brick walls, tile roofs, and stone trim, were retained throughout.

In conjunction with the building boom, the UCLA Medical and Law Schools were established in 1946 and 1947, respectively. The department of Theater Arts was also established in 1947. By 1950, the number of veterans began to decline, but total student enrollment reached a new high of 14,318 students.

== UCLA in the McCarthy era ==
With the rise of the anti-Communist Red Scare in the late 1940s, the UC system became suspected of harboring un-American activities. The Regents on March 25, 1949 had adopted a policy which required all faculty and staff to swear a loyalty oath that disavowed membership in the Communist Party. At a special session of the UC Academic Senate's Northern Section, Edward C. Tolman argued that the policy violated academic freedom and should be rescinded. The Senate, however, voted to request that the controversial oath be "deleted or revised." By August 1950, 36 faculty of Senate rank and 62 non-Senate UC employees were dismissed for refusing to sign the loyalty oath, including three from UCLA: John Caughey, History; C. L. Mowat, History; and David S. Saxon, Physics. (While the state Supreme Court, in 1952's Tolman vs. Underhill, decided that the Regents did not have the power to compel loyalty oaths, in a separate case decided the same day it affirmed the power of the Legislature to require loyalty oaths of all state employees, and ordered the faculty non-signers to be reinstated only on the condition they sign the state's oath.)

On October 21, 1967, The Saturday Evening Post published "UCLA's Red Cell: Case History of College Communism," an article by free-lance writer William Worden, which asserted that leftist student activists had tried to control meetings, propagandize within the columns of the Daily Bruin, distribute literature, file charges of racial discrimination, organize picket lines and incite riots. Worden estimated that one out of each 400 UCLA students were involved in such practices, but the only faculty member the California Un-American Activities Committee said was a member of the Communist party was a woman who played piano for physical education classes in the women's gym.

In response to these controversies, when Provost Dykstra died in 1950, the Regents sought to install someone who would dispel the "hotbed of Communism" stigma at UCLA. After an 18-month search, they selected Raymond B. Allen, head of the Psychological Strategy Board in Washington, D.C. Formerly the president of University of Washington, he was noted for having purged three Communists from employment there in the late 1940s. He said that academic freedom:

consists of something more than merely an absence of restraints placed upon the teacher by the institution that employs him. It demands as well an absence of restraints placed upon him by his political affiliations, by dogmas that stand in the way of a free search for truth or by rigid adherence to a "party line" that sacrifices dignity, honor and integrity to ... political ends.

Allen was also selected because he held an MD and had organized the schools of medicine and dentistry at UW. As the UCLA Medical Center, the largest single building project in UC history at that time, was being constructed, three allied schools of Nursing, Dentistry, and Public Health were also initiated.

Up until the mid-50s, postwar construction had been financed on tax surpluses accumulated during World War II and the Korean War. After those surpluses ran out, further construction was financed on state bond issues. However, the state at that time would not finance student housing, and UCLA comprised 17,000 students with only Hershey Hall (originally constructed in 1930 as a 129-bed women's dorm) accommodating any students on campus. So the Regents floated a loan from the federal government to build Dykstra Hall and Sproul Hall on the hill west of the athletic fields. They opened in 1959 and 1960, respectively. The UCLA Faculty Club assessed their membership $100 apiece and floated a loan from the Regents to build the Faculty Center, which was completed in 1959. Ackerman Union was also built from a Regents loan paid for by fees self-assessed by students in this period.

=== Early research apparatus ===
For the first two decades of its existence, UCLA was oriented towards training educators and toward the liberal arts. With the establishment of graduate studies and professional schools, the school gradually became more oriented toward scientific research. The School of Medicine was developed primarily as a research institution, the first of its kind on the West Coast. SWAC, one of the nation's first large computers, powered by vacuum tubes, was built at UCLA in 1950. IBM established the Western Data Processing Center at UCLA in 1956, an early support and regional training center for the use of computers for quantitative research. Other primitive computers obtained by the Center for Health Sciences and Department of Engineering were linked with SWAC to form an early Campus Computing Network.

The library was also built up to 1,500,000 volumes, twelfth largest in the United States, and specialized branch libraries began to be established in major buildings on campus.

UCLA's growth as a research institution coincided with its upgrade to co-equal status with UC Berkeley. Before 1951, even with its dramatic growth, it was reckoned as an off-site department of the main campus in Berkeley, and it was headed by a provost who reported to Berkeley's president. In 1951, however, the Regents transferred day-to-day leadership responsibilities for the Berkeley and Los Angeles campuses to chancellors. Both chancellors now reported as equals to the UC president, and were vested with considerable autonomy.

=== The first "Golden Age" of UCLA athletics ===
Red Sanders, football coach from 1949–57, led UCLA to 66 victories and a national championship in 1954 until his death in 1958, of a heart attack. John Wooden's basketball teams began to become known. They won four Southern Division titles and were PCC champions three times. "Ducky" Drake's track teams won the PCC and NCAA championships in 1956. Bill Ackerman and J.D. Morgan's tennis teams won five national championships between 1950 and 1956, and the first ever NCAA national championship in volleyball was awarded to UCLA in 1946.

=== The Pacific Coast Conference Crisis ===
In the Winter and Spring of 1956, the unfolding of a huge scandal involving payment of student athletes by booster clubs at Pacific Coast Conference universities threatened to break up the UC system. UCLA was fined $93,000 for its involvement and its football team was placed on a three-year probation. Chancellor Allen wanted UCLA to independently break off from the conference, but President Sproul apparently kept him from doing this. Some alumni seriously wanted UCLA to break away from the Northern California Regents and the UC president entirely. The conflict continued until a 1957 UCLA Alumni Association proposal to the Regents was ultimately successful in moving both UCLA and Berkeley out of the PCC by 1959, effectively breaking up the conference.

Relations between the Pacific Coast universities involved remained hostile for at least a decade. Allen himself resigned as Chancellor in 1959, after he was passed over for the position of President. The Board of Regents had brought Allen from Washington to UCLA with the expectation that he would succeed Sproul in due course, but turned against him because of the Pacific Coast scandal, poor campus planning during his chancellorship, and the perception among the southern Regents that Allen had not put up sufficient resistance to Sproul's stubborn refusals to delegate power to the chancellors. Therefore, when Sproul finally announced his retirement in 1957, Allen was passed over in favor of the chancellor of the Berkeley campus, Clark Kerr. From 1957 to 1960, Kerr decentralized the UC bureaucracy and pushed power and responsibility down to the campus chancellors; although the Regents had attempted to authorize such reforms back in 1951, the process had been repeatedly stalled by Sproul and his closest allies.

To replace Allen, UCLA Vice Chancellor Vern Knudsen was appointed full Chancellor in the year before his retirement, after 38 years of service, after which Franklin David Murphy, dean of the University of Kansas Medical School, was chosen to be UCLA's next Chancellor.

== The California Master Plan ==
Within the framework of the new California Master Plan for Higher Education, signed into state law in 1959, Chancellor Murphy worked to develop a long-range plan for further development and increased autonomy for UCLA. He rapidly increased the number of interdisciplinary institutes and specialized research centers, including various international area studies centers. He worked with the Regents to increase UCLA's library holdings at a faster pace than Berkeley's library so the two would reach parity. A School of Library Service was instituted in 1960, followed by the School of Architecture and Urban Planning in 1966. The quarter system was implemented in 1965.

=== Nobels awarded ===
In 1960, Willard F. Libby, professor of Chemistry, won the first Nobel Prize for science given to a UCLA faculty member, for developing radiocarbon dating. (Alums Ralph Bunche won the Nobel Peace Prize in 1950 for peace-keeping efforts in the Middle East, and Glenn Seaborg won in 1951 for the discovery of plutonium at Berkeley.)

=== More building booms ===
Bond-financed construction boomed through the 1960s, the biggest building era in UCLA's history; Boelter Hall, the Semel Institute for Neuroscience and Human Behavior, Marion Davies Children's Clinic, Dickson Art Center, Engineering Reactor, Pauley Pavilion, Rieber and Hedrick residence halls, Knudsen Hall, Life Science Research Units No. 1 and No. 2., Melnitz Hall, six parking structures, Bunche Hall, Slichter Hall, Ackerman Union, University Research Library, Warren Hall, Rehabilitation, Dentistry, Public Health, and the Jules Stein Eye Institute were some of the additions made. Murphy suggested the idea of a sculpture garden in North Campus while this construction was being planned; Jacques Lipchitz's "Song of the Vowels" was the first object acquired in 1965, for $75,000 raised by Regent Norton Simon and the UCLA Art Council.

=== The second "Golden Age" of UCLA athletics ===
In 1964, Coach John Wooden won the first of what would become a nearly uninterrupted series of 10 NCAA basketball championships before he eventually retired in 1975. Tommy Prothro coached the Bruin football team to its first Rose Bowl victory, against Michigan State, in 1966. Quarterback Gary Beban became the first UCLA player to win the Heisman Trophy in 1967. One hundred national championships have been won including tennis (1965), track (1966), and volleyball (1965 & 1967); numerous conference titles were won in other sports.

== The Charles Young era ==
Chancellor Murphy resigned in 1968 to take over as head of the Times Mirror Company. Under his tenure, enrollment had increased to 29,000, $150,000,000 in new buildings were constructed, 1000 new faculty were hired, and UCLA's annual operating budget increased from $14,000,000 to $95,000,000. The Regents selected Murphy's right-hand man, Charles "Chuck" Young, as the next UCLA Chancellor. After completing his undergraduate studies at the University of California, Riverside, Young had earned his doctorate in political science at UCLA and ultimately became a full professor in that department. At 36, Young was the youngest-ever chief executive officer of a UC campus, and the first graduate of UCLA to become chancellor of the campus.

=== Student unrest ===
The year before Murphy resigned, student unrest against U.S. involvement in the Vietnam War began to be felt at UCLA, when over 500 students, as part of a nationwide protest organized by Students for a Democratic Society, protested the recruitment of graduates on campus by Dow Chemicals, which produced napalm, an incendiary chemical used in the war. The protests escalated as the war continued.

On January 17, 1969, UCLA students and Black Panther Party members John Huggins, 23, and Bunchy Carter, 26, were slain in Campbell Hall by members of US Organization, a rival black power organization headed by Maulana Karenga, in a dispute over the leadership of the new African American Studies Center. Federal agents working under the FBI's COINTELPRO program infiltrated both organizations and provoked the conflict between them.

Later in 1969, the UC Regents fired Angela Davis, a radical feminist and lecturer in the Philosophy Department, for openly identifying as a member of the Communist Party USA. Outraged faculty threatened to withhold grades if Davis was not reinstated, and nearly 2,000 students crammed into Royce Hall's auditorium when Davis delivered her first lecture despite the Regents' decision to remove credit for the class. The overflowing audience gave the 25-year-old professor a standing ovation. On October 22, Chancellor Young complied with a State Superior Court order overruling the Regents' decision by restoring course credit to Davis's class. Eight months later, the Regents again dismissed Davis from the UCLA faculty.

Student unrest at UCLA was further exacerbated when President Richard Nixon ordered the invasion of Cambodia and the National Guard fired upon student protesters at Kent State. Hundreds of student protesters marched through campus and vandalized several buildings, including an ROTC building, and part of Murphy Hall. Chancellor Young declared a state of emergency and summoned the LAPD on campus; 74 arrests were made and 12 people reported injuries. This demonstration and many others at UC campuses throughout the state caused then-Governor Ronald Reagan to shut down the state's colleges and universities for the first time in California's history.

=== ARPANET developed ===
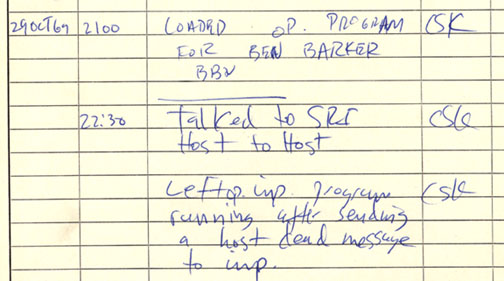
A record of the first message ever sent over the ARPANET in 1969, part of the IMP log kept at UCLA. CSK refers to C S Kline.

ARPANET, the world's first electronic computer network, was deployed on the UCLA campus by student programmer Charley Kline, at 10:30 p.m, on October 29, 1969 from Boelter Hall 3420. Supervised by Prof. Leonard Kleinrock, Kline transmitted from the university's SDS Sigma 7 host to Douglas Engelbart's SDS 940 at the Stanford Research Institute in Menlo Park, California. The message text was the word "login", and while the "l" and "o" characters were transmitted, the system then crashed. Hence, the literal first message over the ARPANET was "lo". About an hour later, having recovered from the crash, the Sigma 7 computer transmitted the full "login". Not even a month later, the first ever permanent ARPANET link would be established between UCLA and Stanford Research Institute on November 21. By December 5, the entire four-node network was established.

Turing Award laureate Vint Cerf was a doctoral student in the computer science department under Kleinrock in the early 1970s and also worked on the ARPANET. He would later team with Robert Kahn in the writing of the seminal 1974 paper A Protocol for Packet Network Intercommunication. This work proved foundational for their later development of the Transmission Control Protocol/Internet Protocol suite or TCP/IP.

=== The 1980s and 1990s ===
In 1981, the UCLA Medical Center made history when assistant professor Michael S. Gottlieb first diagnosed an unknown affliction later to be called HIV/AIDS.

In 1984, UCLA hosted the gymnastics and tennis competitions for the Olympic games and served as an "Olympic village." Also in 1984, the Alumni Association celebrated its 50th anniversary by donating the "Bruin Bear" statue, located at Bruin Plaza, and the "Mighty Bruins" fight song, composed by Academy Award winner Bill Conti, to the university.

In 1987, Professor Donald Cram received the Nobel Prize in chemistry, for host–guest chemistry.

In 1988, Kleinrock chaired a group which produced the report Toward a National Research Network. This report was presented to Congress and was so influential on then-Senator Al Gore that it proved to be the foundation for what would be passed as the High Performance Computing Act of 1991, written and developed by Gore. Indeed, funding for the development of Mosaic in 1993, the World Wide Web browser which is often credited as leading to the Internet boom during the mid-1990s, came from the High-Performance Computing and Communications Initiative, a program created by the High Performance Computing Act of 1991., On January 11, 1994, as Vice-President, Gore gave the opening speech for the Superhighway Summit held at UCLA's Royce Hall. In 2001, Gore joined the faculty of UCLA as a visiting professor in the School of Public Policy and Social Research, Department of Policy Studies, family-centered community building.

Student activism in the 1980s centered primarily on the South African government's apartheid policies, the U.S.'s Central American policy, as well as the implementation of affirmative action in the state. In 1988 poor race relations on campus lead to student riots over the disqualification of Lloyd Monserratt as student body president in a campaign that pitted a coalition of minority students against the candidates put forth by members of the Greek system (this antagonism continues today).

In the 1990s, student activists tended to focus on university and statewide concerns, such as union recognition for graduate teaching assistants, the expansion of the Chicano Studies Center, 1994's debate over Proposition 187 to deny social services to illegal immigrants, and Proposition 209 in 1996, which ended affirmative action in California.

The Northridge quake struck UCLA on January 17, 1994. The thirty second jolt caused significant structural damage to Kerckhoff and Royce Halls. The Medical Center had damage as well as chemical spills. While the campus was undergoing an earthquake retrofit, the quake accelerated efforts to make buildings earthquake resistant.

Charles E. Young, the longest serving university chancellor in U.S. history, retired in 1997, the same year Prop 209 was implemented. The year before he left, ethnic minority enrollment at UCLA approached 60 percent. The university hosted 120 endowed faculty chairs, 6.7 million volumes in the UCLA Library, and operating expenses approached $2 billion. Extramural funding for research had increased from $66.4 million in 1968-'69 to $406 million in 1995-'96. Private fund-raising likewise flourished, from $6.1 million raised in 1968–1969 to $190.8 million in 1995–1996.

== A new century ==
=== Activism and complications (2000–2006) ===
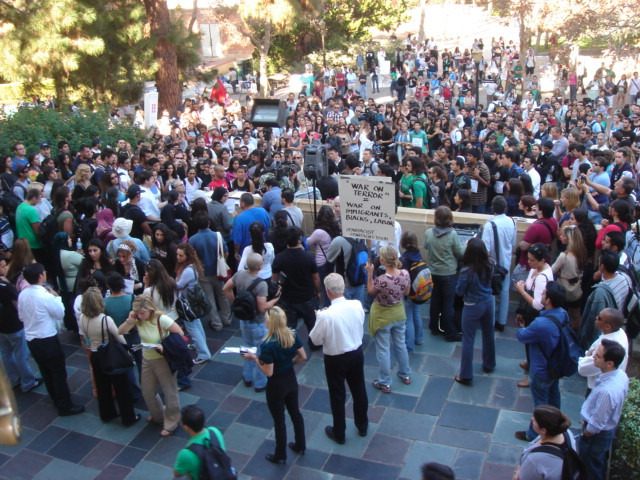
Students gather for a news conference on the UCLA Taser incident

In 1995, 2001 and 2004, Mother Jones magazine named UCLA in its annual listing of the Top 10 Activist Campuses, reflecting the rallying spirit of its student bodies over the years.

The Bruin Republicans held the first affirmative action bake sale protesting racial preferences in 2003, a practice which has been copied by other conservative student groups at universities across the country. In 2006, Andrew Jones, former Bruin Republicans president and Daily Bruin columnist, founded the IRS-recognized non-profit organization known as the Bruin Alumni Association, though the organization is not affiliated with the university, with Bruin Republicans, or with any on-campus student organization. Its stated purpose is to expose the "Dirty Thirty" most liberal professors at UCLA. Controversy developed over Jones' offer of monetary compensation for students who recorded the lectures of faculty members for later exposure on his site.

Other recent activism includes a movement since 2004 to pressure the UC Regents to divest from Sudan because of the mass killings in the Darfur region.

Between October 2005 and November 2006, an experienced hacker broke into a university database containing approximately 800,000 files of personal information. Names, Social Security numbers, and basic contact information was contained in these files, but banking numbers were not. On November 21, 2006, the system administrators noticed unauthorized activity and blocked further access to the database. While it was not conclusive whether the hacker used these records to commit identity theft or fraud, it was determined that very few records were actually accessed and even fewer specifics were obtained.

In March 2006, the Regents voted in favor of divestment, becoming the largest university system yet to do so.

The UCLA Taser incident occurred on November 14, 2006, when student Mostafa Tabatabainejad was stunned multiple times by campus police for allegedly refusing to be escorted out of Powell Library, following his refusing to present his BruinCard to a Community Service Officer.

=== Present day (2007–present) ===
On May 13, 2007, the Women's Water Polo team beat Stanford University 5–4. The victory gave UCLA its 100th NCAA championship title; it is the first school with this distinction.

In October 2009, a student was slashed in the throat in an organic chemistry class at Young Hall. Damon Thompson of Belize was arrested on suspicion of attempted murder. The student was in a pool of blood but was saved by her teaching assistant who slowed down the bleeding.

On July 29, 2014, a nearly century-old water main burst on the section of Sunset Boulevard immediately above campus, sending approximately twenty million gallons of water flooding below. The nearly four-hour rush of water caused damage to buildings and athletic facilities, including Pauley Pavilion and the Wooden Center. In addition, several parking structures were partially inundated, trapping nearly 740 cars.

On June 1, 2016, two men died in a murder-suicide inside an engineering building at UCLA.

=== Sexual harassment scandals ===
In 2014, a graduate student adviser and professor in the history department, Gabriel Piterberg, was accused of sexually assaulting two students. A lawsuit was filed against the university by attorney Ann Olivarius for its failure to properly act on the accusations. An editorial in the student newspaper wrote about the university's response, "This outcome is an embarrassment for UCLA. Not only does this represent a huge step backward and a betrayal of students' trust, but it displays a startlingly low standard when it comes to treatment of sexual assault suspects." The university settled with the plaintiffs and suspended and fined Piterberg, then did more after student protest and legal efforts, including "separation from employment, denial of emeritus status, [and] denial of future employment with the University of California." In 2015, the U.S. Department of Education's Office for Civil Rights investigated UCLA and other universities for their compliance with Title IX and responses to sexual violence.

In 2018, the university came into the national spotlight again when the Los Angeles Times reported that four employees had filed lawsuits against UCLA and the UC Board of Regents having accused their workplace supervisor of sexual harassment and the university of failing to properly handle abuse complaints. The harassment allegedly started in early 2016, according to the lawsuits. The women faced retaliation from other supervisors after they filed complaints. The retaliatory behavior included making the women do more work and not allowing them to take time off to see their attorney. They are seeking more than $120 million in damages. Subsequently, an audit by the California State Auditor found inconsistent discipline in UCLA sexual misconduct cases. The state audit also found that UCLA did not follow university policy or Title IX requirements.

In recent years, UCLA's Title IX office has faced public criticism from students and researchers over its handling of sexual harassment complaints and the transparency of its investigations. In 2023, The Daily Bruin highlighted systemic dissatisfaction with the office, noting a 2018 case where an astronomy graduate student's resilience and professional success were explicitly cited by investigators as evidence that a superior's unwelcome behavior had not caused enough professional damage to constitute harassment.

=== 2019 college admissions bribery scandal ===
UCLA was one of several universities named in the 2019 college admissions bribery scandal, which is the largest college admissions scandal ever prosecuted by the United States Department of Justice. On Tuesday, March 12, 2019, UCLA men's soccer coach Jorge Salcedo was one of many coaches across the country charged with racketeering and conspiracy, and is alleged to have taken over $200,000 in bribes. Salcedo pleaded guilty to the charges in April 2020, and in March 2021 was sentenced to, among other things, 8 months in prison.

=== 2024 Pro-Palestine encampments ===
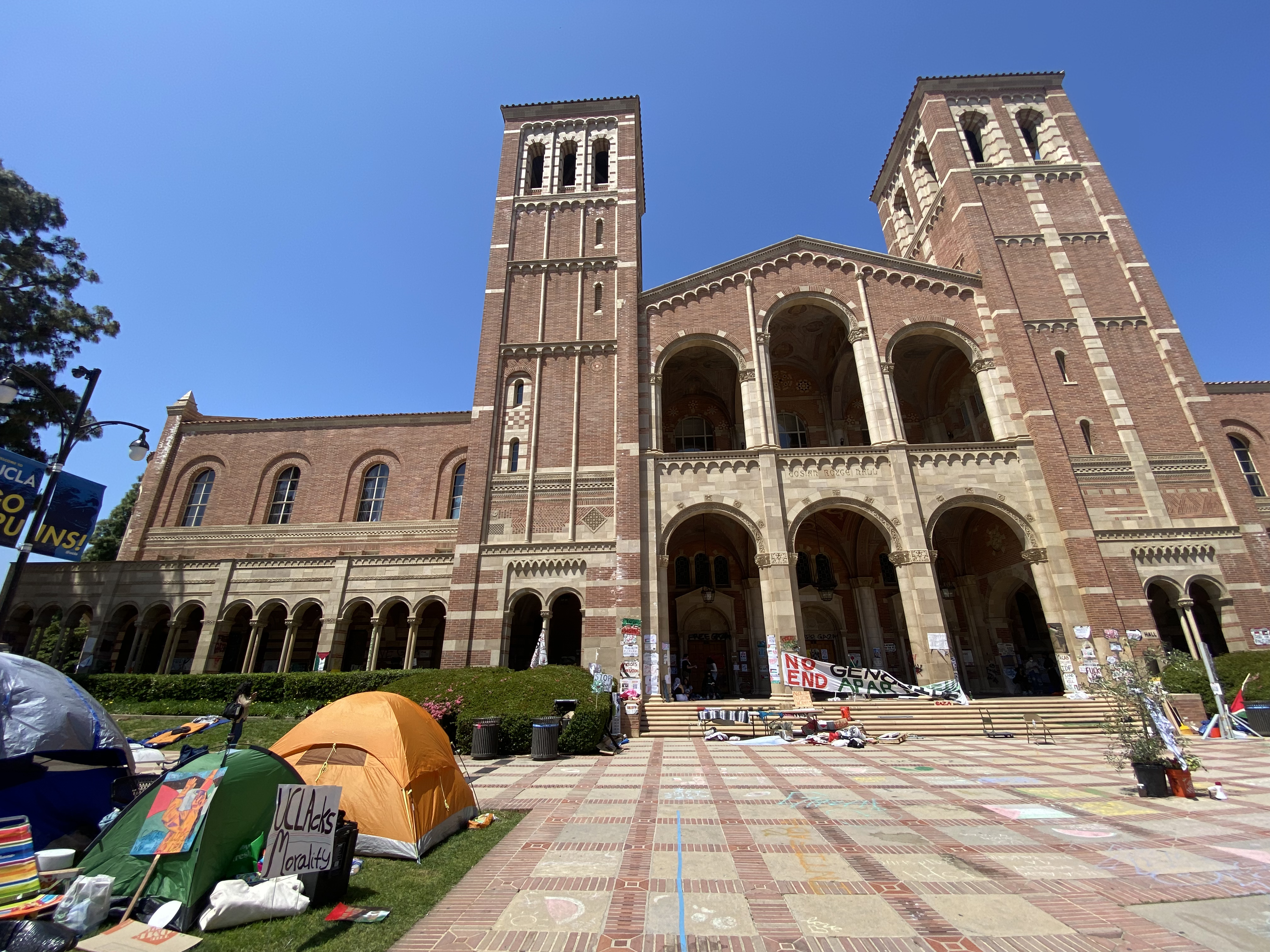
The UCLA campus occupation on April 30, 2024, the day it was attacked by pro-Israeli counter-protesters

On the morning of April 25, 2024, various organizations joined by students, staff and faculty set up a barricaded encampment at Royce Quad, led by the university's chapter of Students for Justice in Palestine (SJP), in a peaceful protest of the university's complicity in the violence against Palestinian civilians in Gaza committed by the government and armed forces of Israel.

On April 30 UCLA had declared the camp unlawful and in violation of university policy. At approximately 10:30 pm, pro-Israeli counter-protesters began to swarm the encampment, eventually leading to a direct assault on the encampment in which pro-Israeli counter-protesters violently assaulted those around the perimeter of the encampment. The violence continued until approximately 3:00 am on May 1 when police officers moved in to break up the altercations.

On the morning of Thursday, May 2, police moved in to disassemble the barricades as protesters attempted to keep them up. The police proceeded to launch flares and shoot rubber bullets into the crowd of protesters. The Los Angeles Police Department (LAPD) reported 209 people were taken into custody, many were booked on a suspicion of failing to disperse.

== See also ==
- Bibliography of California history
- Bibliography of Los Angeles
- Outline of the history of Los Angeles
