= UCLA Walter H. Rubsamen Music Library =

Academic music library

Rubsamen Music Library at UCLA
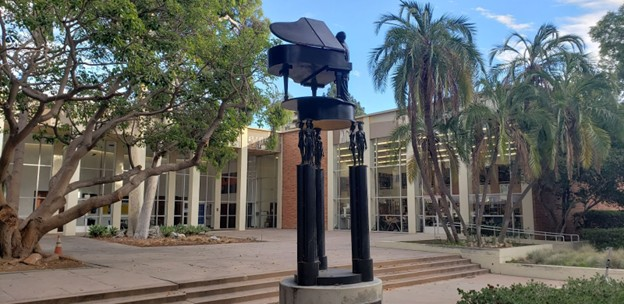
- Schoenberg Music Building at UCLA, including the exterior of the Music Library.
- 34.0709°N 118.4403°W
- Location: Los Angeles, California
- Type: academic library
- Established: 1942 (84 years ago)
- Architect: Welton Becket
- Branch of: UCLA Library

Collection
- Size: 80,000 books, 115,000 scores, over 200,000 sound recordings

Access and use
- Circulation: 35,000
- Population served: 100,000

Other information
- Website: www.library.ucla.edu/visit/locations/music-library/

The UCLA Walter H. Rubsamen Music Library is one of nine branch libraries at the University of California, Los Angeles. It serves the Herb Alpert School of Music and is housed within the Schoenberg Music Building.

== History ==
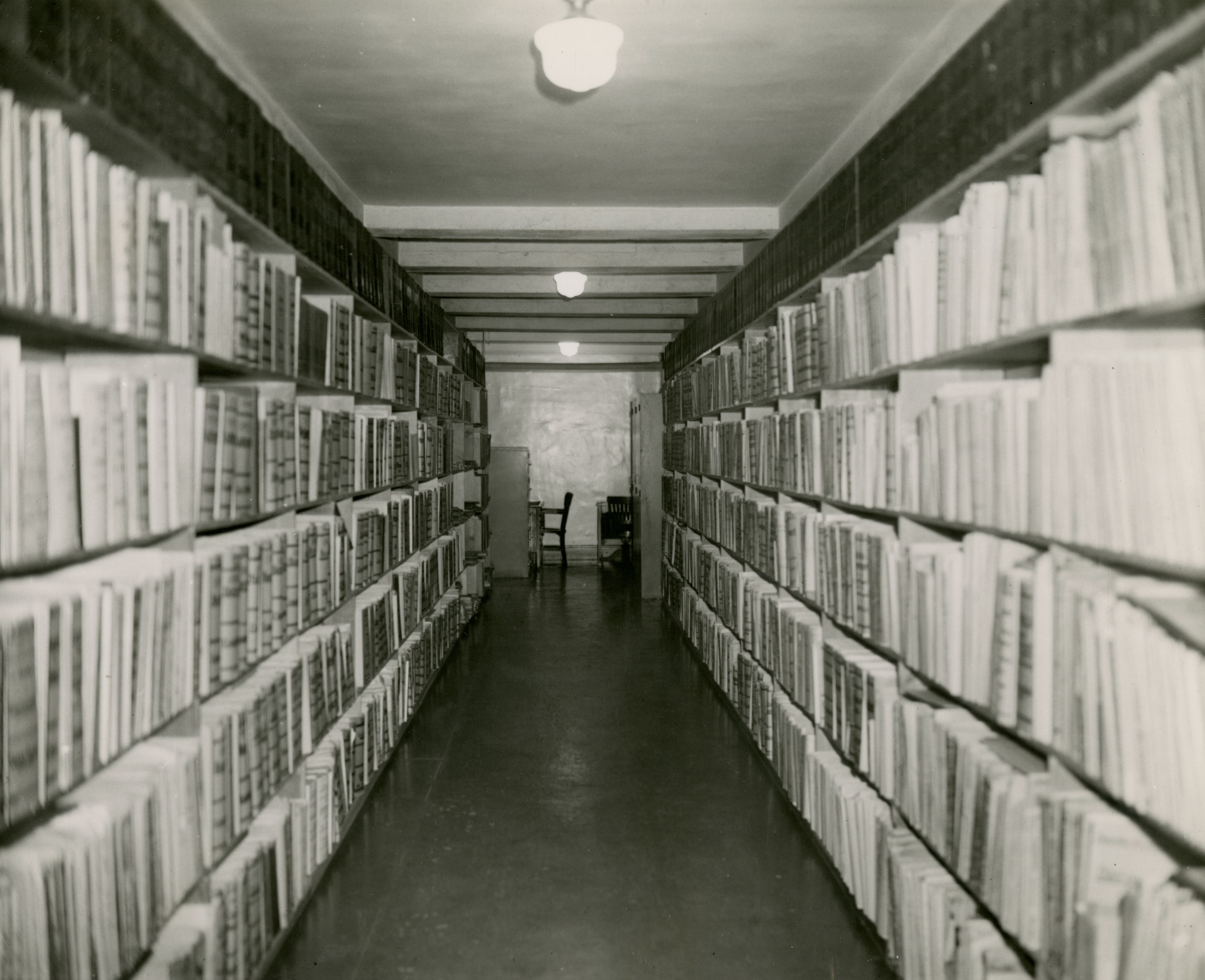
Music Library Shelves in the Powell Library Building

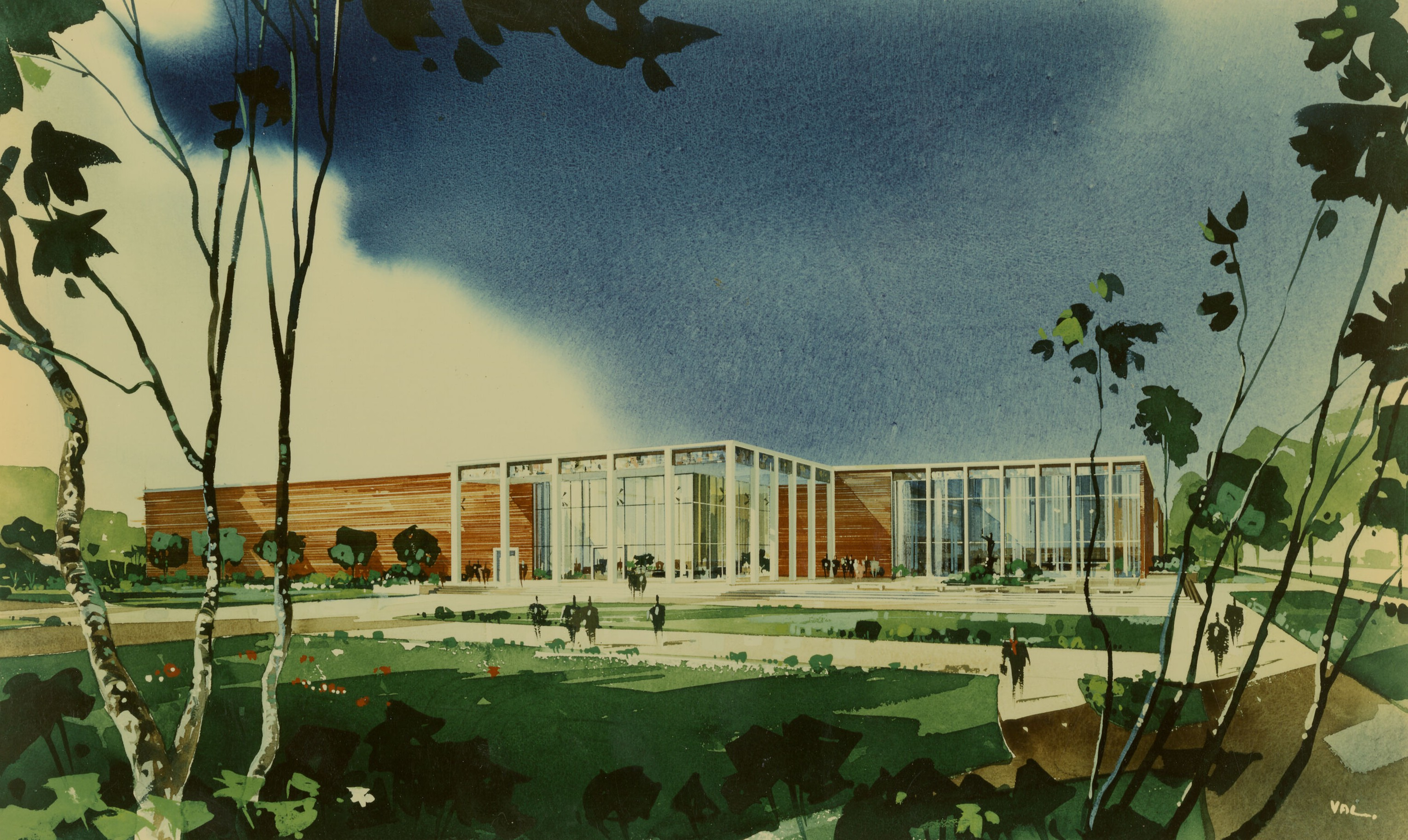
Architectural rendering of Schoenberg Music Building

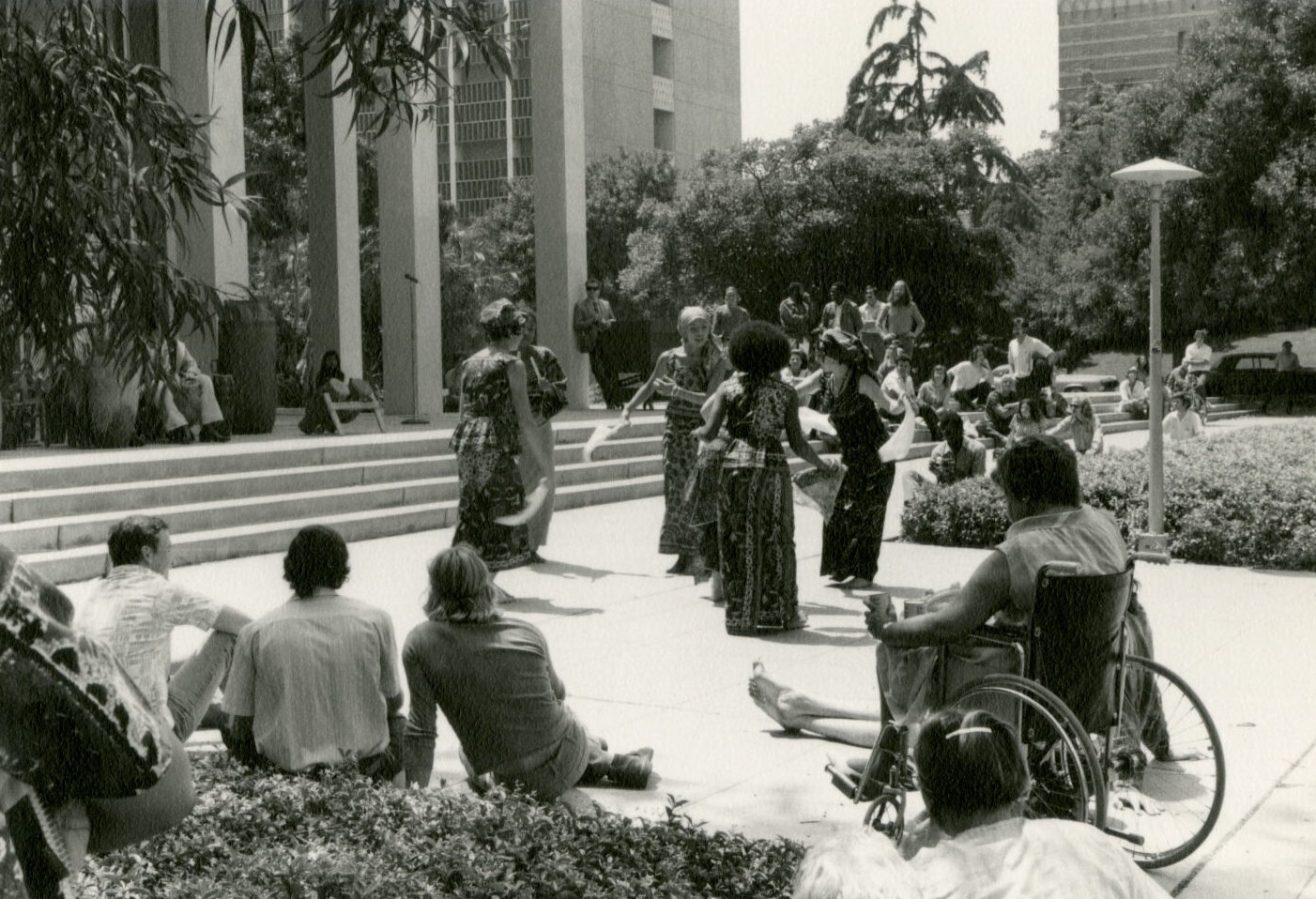
Women of the African Music and Dance Ensemble performing during the Ethnomusicology Spring Music Festival

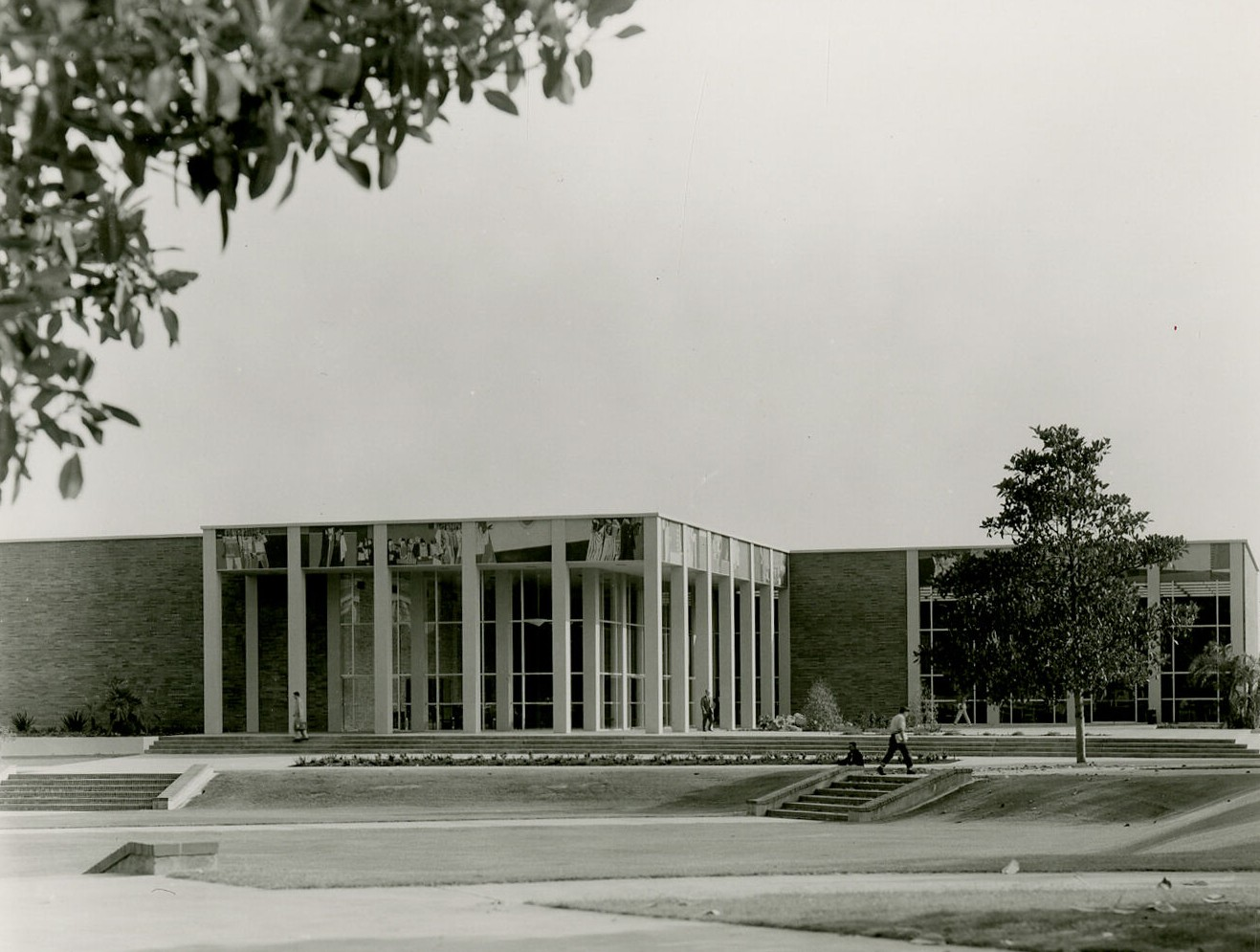
Exterior view of Schoenberg Music Building

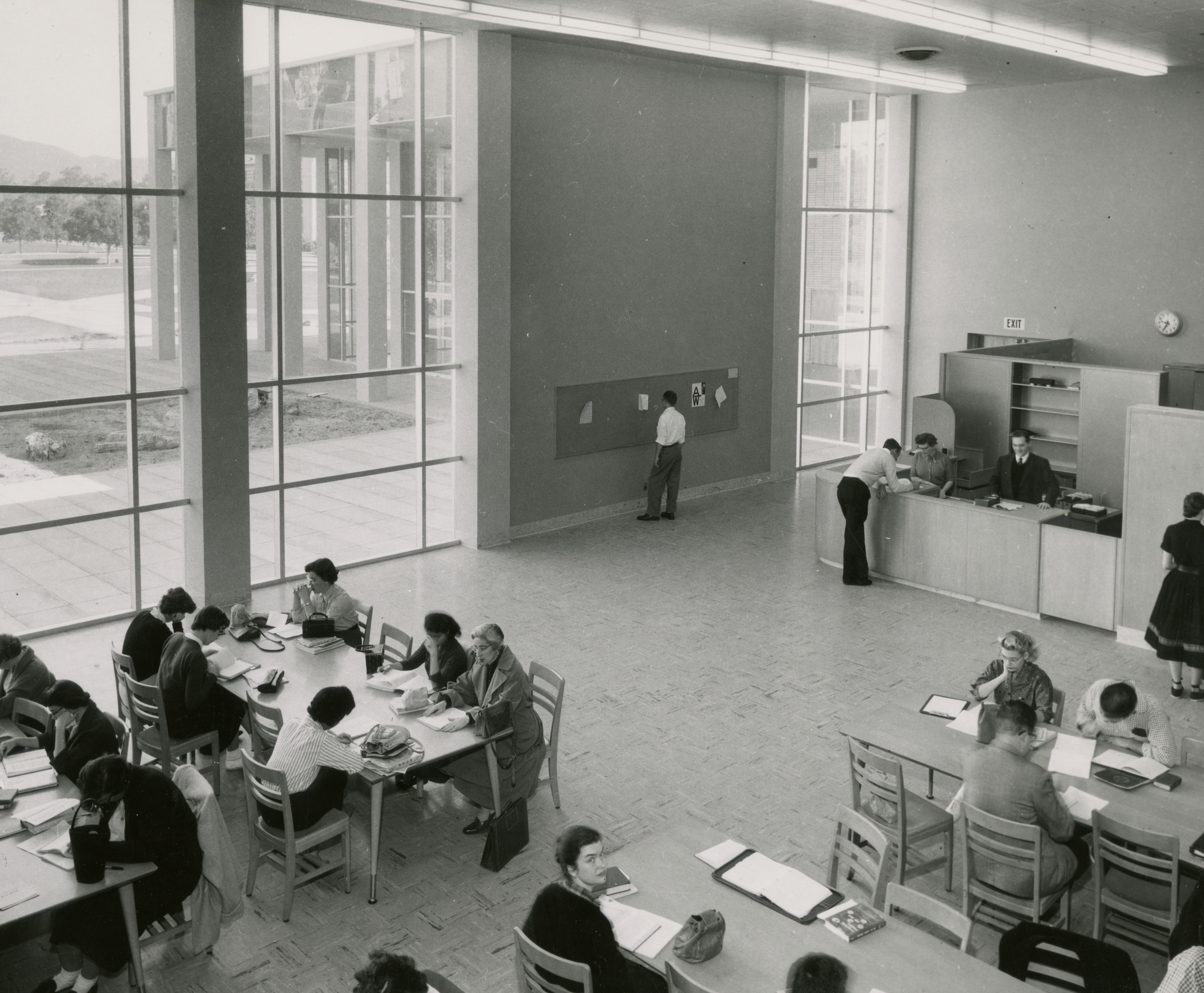
Students studying in the Walter H. Rubsamen Music Library reading room

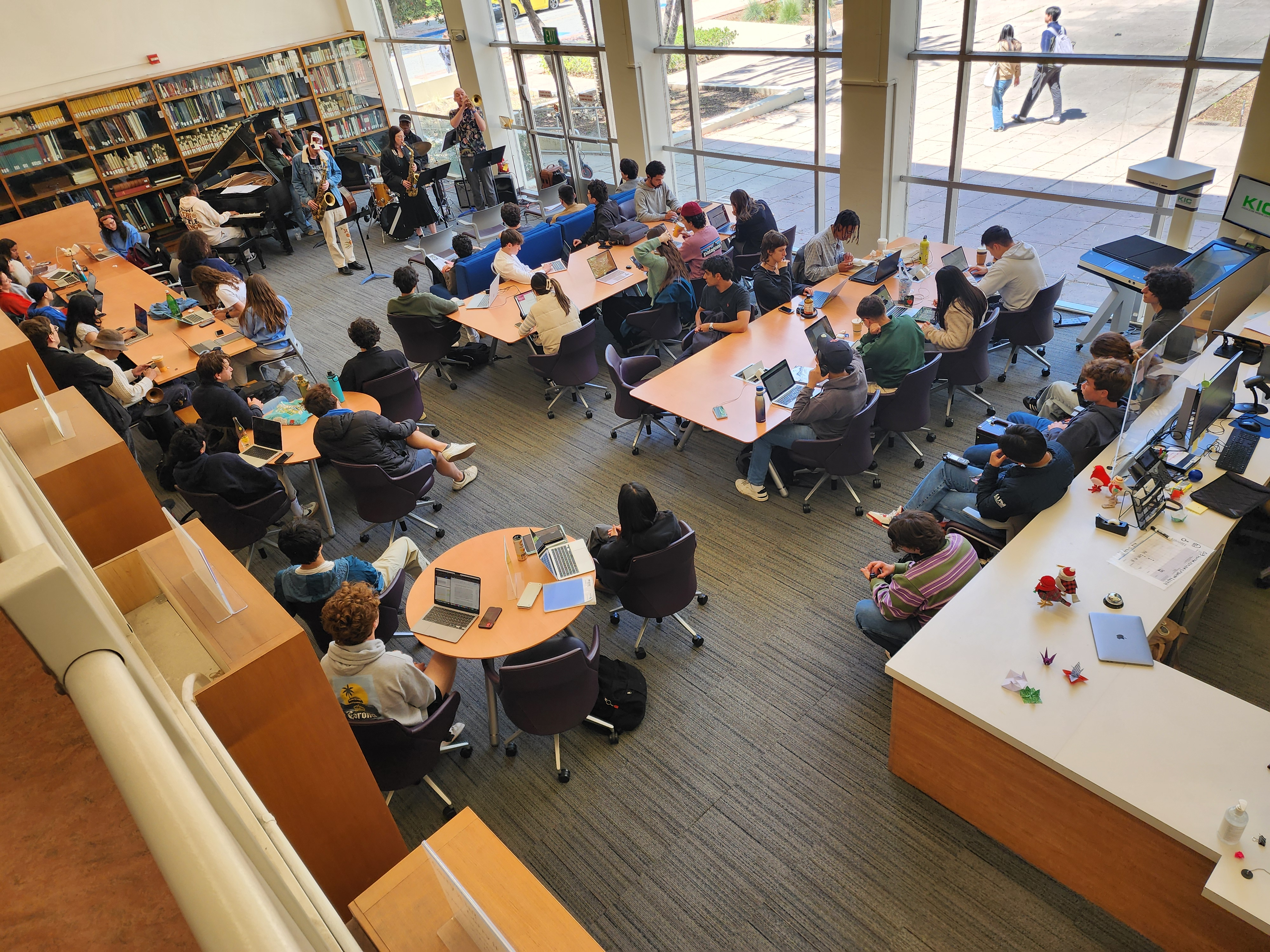
Jam session with the Herbie Hancock Institute of Jazz in the Walter H. Rubsamen Music Library

=== Beginnings ===
The music library began in an east–west corridor of Powell Library in 1942. The initial collection consisted of roughly 8,000 orchestral and choral scores inherited from the Federal Music Project as well as 3,000 books and scores transferred from the main University Library. The collection was first managed by Leon Strashun, who took a special interest in binding and maintaining the collection's music scores until his retirement in 1946. In 1947, Ruth Doxsee took over as music librarian. Doxsee helped to host weekly concerts of recorded music for library staff. She also served on an interdepartmental committee dedicated to handling the "many special technical challenges" that arose while cataloging the music collection. When the music collection's corridor was needed for transit to the library's new east wing, the music collection was moved to a room at the south end of the library's west wing. As the collection grew, this space became increasingly cramped, and the Department of Music quickly developed a need for a dedicated music library.

=== The New Music Library ===
In 1956, the music collection moved from its wing in Powell Library to a newly built space in the music building. The new space featured two levels of stacks (estimated to hold 25,000 volumes, with room for future expansion), a dedicated service counter and catalog, and ten listening rooms equipped with sound systems. When the new music library opened its doors, the collection numbered roughly 36,000 items. By 2021, that number had grown to 400,000 items.

On February 27, 1976, the library was named after Walter H. Rubsamen, professor emeritus of the UCLA Department of Music. Rubsamen was an important figure in developing the music library’s collection, and took a special interest in cultivating a ballad opera collection and bringing English music materials to the Clark Library.

== Collections ==
The music library's collection has grown in conjunction with the music program at UCLA, and in particular the departments of musicology and ethnomusicology. In 1980, the collection's main focus was on music from the 13th to 17th centuries to suit the needs of a musicology faculty with a focus on historical methods. As the Musicology and Ethnomusicology Departments became more interested in cultural critiques of music in different genres and traditions, the collection focused on popular music materials in order to meet students' research needs in classes like "Gay and Lesbian Perspectives in Pop Music," "History of Electronic Dance Music", and "Cultural History of Rap."

=== Contemporary Music Score Collection ===
Developed by music librarian Matthew Vest in 2020, the Contemporary Music Score Collection consists of digital open access scores published as part of the Contemporary Score Edition series, the first open access edition of new music published by a library. The collection includes music by UCLA students, faculty, and scores commissioned by the Hugo and Christine Davise Fund.

=== Ella Fitzgerald Collection ===
The Ella Fitzgerald Collection consists of roughly 46,000 pieces of sheet music from Fitzgerald's personal collection, as well as related correspondence. It is now housed in the UCLA Performing Arts Special Collections.

=== Other Collections ===
The music library has acquired various smaller collections over time. The Donovan Meher Collection focuses on rock music over a thirty-year span, from roughly 1980–2010. Music librarian Callie Holmes helped curate the Southern California Punk Collection and the Los Angeles Hip Hop Collection, which include late 20th century popular music materials from the Southern California area. Other rare items, including facsimiles, manuscript fragments, and sound recordings, are kept in the music library reading room cabinet.

== Outreach and Events ==
In 1973, the music library began taking on interns from UCLA's new Master of Library & Information Science degree program, allowing students to gain on-the-job training by completing a large-scale project in the music library, over several months.

The Rubsamen Music Library hosts community events such as conferences, classes, and concerts, including an ongoing series of Jam Sessions in collaboration with students from the Herbie Hancock Institute of Jazz. In 2012, music librarian David Gilbert began using the Hugo and Christine Davise Fund to support free admission for concerts by new music artists and organizations such as the Lyris Quartet, Gloria Cheng, Piano Spheres, and wild Up.
