= Sybel-Ficker controversy =

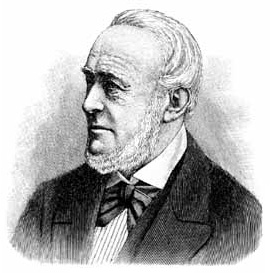
Heinrich von Sybel

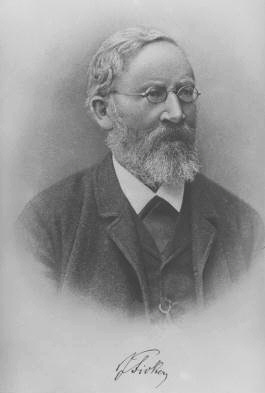
Julius Ficker

The Sybel-Ficker controversy (German: Sybel-Ficker-Streit) is the name given to a dispute in the second half of the 19th century between the historians Heinrich von Sybel (1817–1895) and Julius von Ficker (1826–1902). It involved a discussion concerning relations between Rome (that is, the papal see) and the Holy Roman Empire, which also had an important bearing on the Austria–Prussia rivalry—whether Austria was to be part of a federal Germany, or whether Germany would continue without Austria (as a Lesser Germany).

Heinrich von Sybel fired the first shot in the dispute in an 1859 lecture, in which he condemned the medieval politics of the German Empire as "unnational". Julius Ficker countered in 1861 in lectures at the University of Innsbruck, in which he justified the emperors' national politics, which he also presented as universal. While Sybel's was a "kleindeutsch-norddeutsch-protestantische" (Little German-North German-Protestant) concept of history, Ficker promoted a Greater Germany which would include Austria.

== Background ==
The controversy's roots are in the Austria–Prussia rivalry which had grown more intense in the 18th century. Prussia, under Frederick the Great, had emerged as a major European power, and Sybel finds cause for the dispute in early 19th-century Prussian historiography. It continues with the founding of the German Empire under Bismarck in 1871, which had become possible with the Prussian victory over Austria in the Austro-Prussian War of 1866. Historians have argued that it continued into the 20th century, with Hitler's Anschluss of 1938 as one high point.

The disagreement over the politics of the medieval Empire was important because those should determine the political direction and the national identity of the first national German state. Comments by Wilhelm von Giesebrecht, who like Sybel was a student of Leopold von Ranke, provoked Sybel into taking a public position. In his Geschichte der deutschen Kaiserzeit (1855–1888), Giesebrecht wrote: "Moreover, the period of the Empire is the era when our people, strengthened through unity, had risen to a position of power where it could not only freely determine its own fate, but could also commandeer other peoples, and where the German man exercised his greatest power in the world and the German name had the richest sound". Sybel countered that throughout the period of the Empire, starting with Otto I, Holy Roman Emperor, "national" interests had been betrayed while the Empire pursued interests in Italy, that its interest in the affairs of the Kingdom of Italy had led only to meaningless loss of life. This was different, according to Sybel, under Otto's father, Henry the Fowler, but after him German politics were aimed in the wrong direction: "The powers of the nation, which at first and correctly following instinct had been directed toward the great colonization of the east, were afterwards aimed at an always alluring and always incorrect gleam of power south of the Alps.".

Sybel's position suggested the kind of imperialist thinking that found its expression in the famous Drang nach Osten phrase and had become a reality in the Ostsiedlung, the migration and settlement of German-speaking peoples during the Holy Roman Empire. Sybel leaned on this development, even though it hadn't started under Heinrich I but rather in the 12th century, first past the Elbe and then across the Oder, the settlement that had created Prussia, Saxony, and Silesia in Slavic areas. At the inception of the Alldeuscher Verband, this movement was reiterated: "The old drive toward the East should be restored". The development by Friedrich Ratzel, in 1898, of the idea of Lebensraum supported this settler colonialism, which came to be seen as an alternative for the transatlantic migration to America..

== Bibliography ==
- Schneider, Friedrich (1940). Die neueren Anschauungen der deutschen Historiker über die deutsche Kaiserpolitik des Mittelalters und die mit ihr verbundene Ostpolitik. Weimar.
- Friedrich Schneider (Hrsg.): Universalstaat oder Nationalstaat. Macht und Ende des Ersten deutschen Reiches. Die Streitschriften von Heinrich von Sybel und Julius Ficker zur deutschen Kaiserpolitik des Mittelalters. Innsbruck 1941.
- Wolfgang Wippermann: Der ‚Deutsche Drang nach Osten‘. Ideologie und Wirklichkeit eines politischen Schlagwortes. Darmstadt 1981, ISBN 3-05-003841-1.
- Frank Helzel: Ein König, ein Reichsführer und der Wilde Osten. Heinrich I. (919–936) in der nationalen Selbstwahrnehmung der Deutschen. transcript, Bielefeld 2004, ISBN 3-89942-178-7 (Fachwissenschaftliche Rezension bei H-Soz-u-Kult und H-Net Reviews).
- Thomas Brechenmacher: Wieviel Gegenwart verträgt historisches Urteilen? Die Kontroverse zwischen Heinrich von Sybel und Julius Ficker über die Bewertung der Kaiserpolitik des Mittelalters (1859–1862). In: Ulrich Muhlack (ed.): Historisierung und gesellschaftlicher Wandel in Deutschland im 19. Jahrhundert. Berlin 2003, S. 87–112, ISBN 3-05-003841-1.
- Rienow, A.: Der Streit zwischen Heinrich von Sybel und Julius Ficker. In Foerster, S. et al. (Hrsg.): Blumen für Clio: Einführung in Methoden und Theorien der Geschichtswissenschaft aus studentischer Perspektive. Marburg 2011, S. 237–269, ISBN 978-3-8288-2572-7.
