= William Clarke Wescoe =

10th Chancellor of University of Kansas
- In office 1960–1969
- Preceded by: Franklin David Murphy
- Succeeded by: E. Laurence Chalmers

Personal details
- Born: May 3, 1920 Allentown, Pennsylvania
- Died: February 29, 2004 (aged 83)
- Education: Muhlenberg College (BS); Cornell Medical College (MD)
- Profession: Educator, physician, pharmacologist, academic administrator

William Clarke Wescoe (May 3, 1920 – February 29, 2004) was an American medical educator, physician, pharmacologist and academic administrator. He was selected as the dean of the University of Kansas School of Medicine at the age of 32 and served in that capacity from 1952 to 1960. He was the 10th chancellor of the University of Kansas from 1960 to 1969, leading the university during a time of both campus growth with the near doubling in enrollment and unrest during the 1960s. More than $40 million in new construction was completed, including most of the Daisy Hill residence halls.

== Background ==
William Clarke Wescoe was born in Allentown, Pennsylvania on May 3, 1920, to Charles H. and Hattie G. Wescoe. He received his B.S. from Muhlenberg College in 1941 and his medical degree from the Cornell Medical College of Cornell University in 1944.

== Career ==
Wescoe was an intern and resident at New York Hospital–Cornell Medical Center. Prior to his in academic career, he was assigned to the War Department's Army Specialized Training Program by the United States government and served the United States Army as a medical officer in the US Army's Fitzsimons General Hospital in Aurora, Colorado in 1946, where he remained three months and was put in charge of the tuberculosis ward, which at the time was filled primarily by those American soldiers who'd survived the Bataan Death March and wartime Japanese internment in the Philippines. He was reassigned to the Army Chemical Center at Edgewood Arsenal, Maryland. His responsibilities at Edgewood Arsenal centered on biomedical research and the development of pharmacological treatments to various chemical and nerve agents. He was discharged from military in 1948.

== Employment history ==
Cornell University

- 1949–1951 Assistant Professor of Pharmacology at Cornell University Medical College. In 1949 he received the prestigious Markle Scholarship

University of Kansas

- 1951–1952 Professor of Pharmacology and Experimental Medicine at the University of Kansas
- 1952–1960 Dean of the University of Kansas School of Medicine
- 1960–1969 Chancellor of the University of Kansas

Sterling Drug, Inc

- 1969–1985 first as vice president for Medical Affairs and Research, later rising to the position of chairman of the board and chief executive officer

Boards and committees

- 1985–2004 Board of Directors of the New York Stock Exchange as well as several academic, corporate, and foundation boards, and as a trustee of Columbia University and Cornell Medical School
