= Walter H. Rubsamen =

American musicologist (1911–1973)

Professor Walter Howard Rubsamen
- Born: July 21, 1911
- Died: June 19, 1973 (aged 61)
- Education: Columbia University; Ludwig-Maximilians-Universität München
- Employer: University of California, Los Angeles
- Spouse: Gisela Roth Rubsamen
- Family: Valerie Rubsamen, Glen Rubsamen
- Awards: Guggenheim Fellowship (1947, 1957)

Walter Howard Rubsamen (July 21, 1911 – June 19, 1973) was an American musicologist specializing in Italian music of the Renaissance, Ballad Opera, as well as music and politics. He was professor of musicology at the University of California, Los Angeles (UCLA).

== Career ==
Rubsamen was born in New York City. He earned a B.A. from Columbia University in 1933 where he studied with Paul Henry Lang, Douglas Moore, Daniel Gregory Mason, and Seth Bingham. In 1937, he received a Ph.D. from the Ludwig-Maximilians-Universität München where his teachers included Rudolf von Ficker and Otto Ursprung, taking his doctorate about the music of Pierre de La Rue. He also studied flute in New York with Georges Barrère and Meredith Willson.

In 1938, Rubsamen joined the music faculty at UCLA, becoming a full professor in 1955 and serving until his death in 1973. He was chairman of the music department from 1965 until 1973. He was awarded a Guggenheim fellowship twice, once in 1947 and again in 1957, and also earned a Ford Foundation fellowship.

Rubsamen also served as president of the Dante Alighieri Society of Southern California from 1969 to 1970. He died aged 61. On February 27, 1976, the UCLA Walter H. Rubsamen Music Library was named in his honor.

== Selected publications ==
- "Political and Ideological Censorship of Opera", in: Proceedings of the American Musicological Society (1941), pp. 30–42.
- Literary Sources of Secular Music in Italy (Berkley & Los Angeles: University of California Press, 1943).
- "Karl Huber of Munich", in: Musical Quarterly 30 (1944), pp. 266–233.
- "Music Research in Italian libraries. An Anecdotal Account of Obstacles and Discoveries", in: Notes 6, No. 2 (March 1949), pp. 220–233.
- "The Ballad Burlesques and Extravaganzas", in: Musical Quarterly 36 (1950), pp. 551–571.
- "Schoenberg in America", in: Musical Quarterly 37 (1951), pp. 469–489.
- "Descriptive Music for Stage and Screen", in: Hinrichsen's Musical Year Book 7 (London: Hinrichsen, 1952), pp. 559–569.
- "Mr. Seedo, Ballad Opera, and the Singspiel", in: Miscelánea en homenaje a Monseñor Higinio Anglés (Barcelona: Consejo Superior de Investigaciones Científicas, 1958–1961), vol. 2, pp. 775–809.
- "From Frottola to Madrigal: The Changing Pattern of Secular Italian Vocal Music", in Chanson and Madrigal, 1480-1530 (Cambridge, Mass.: Harvard University Press, 1964), pp. 51–87.
- "The Music for 'Quant'è bella giovinezza' and Other Carnival Songs by Lorenzo de Medici", in: Charles Singleton (ed.): Art Science and History in the Renaissance (Baltimore: Johns Hopkins University Press, 1967), pp. 163–184.
- "The Earliest French Lute Tablature", in: Journal of the American Musicological Society 21 (1968), pp. 286–299.
- "Unifying Techniques in Selected Masses of Josquin and La Rue: a Stylistic Comparison", in: Josquin des Prez: Proceedings of the International Josquin Festival-Conference held at the Juilliard School at Lincoln Center in New York City, 21–25 June 1971 (London & New York: Oxford University Press, 1976), pp. 369–400.
- "Irish Folk Music in Midas, a Ballad Burlesque of the 18th Century", in: Report of the eleventh Congress, International Musicological Society, Copenhagen 1972 (Copenhagen: Hansen, 1974), pp. 623–632.

== Editions ==
- Jacob Regnart: Puer natus est for six parts (New York, 1968).
- Anonymous (16th century): Magnificat on Christmas Carols in four and five voices (New York, 1971).
- The Ballad Opera. A Collection of 171 Texts of Musical Plays Printed in Photo-Facsimile, 28 volumes (New York, 1974).
