= Charles E. Young =

American academic and administrator (1931–2023)

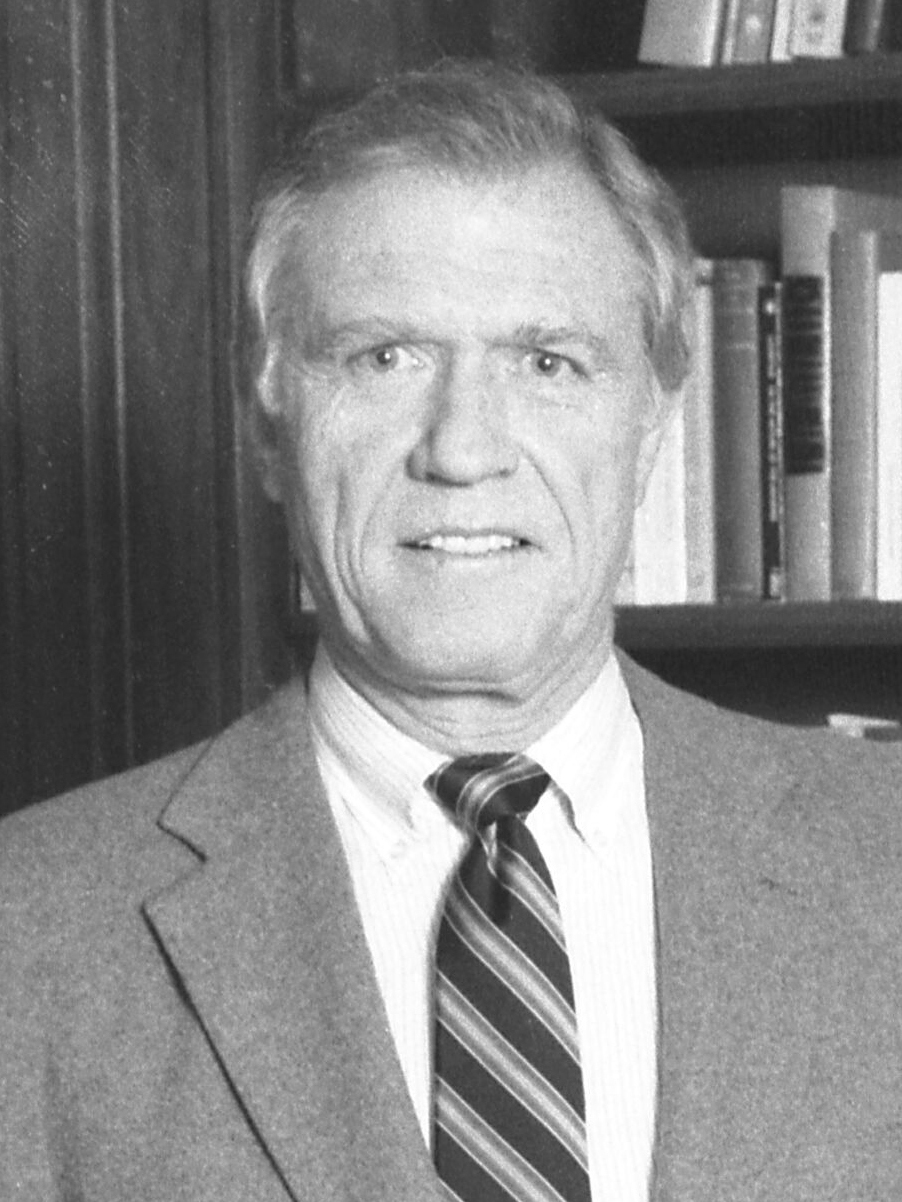
- Young in 1986

10th President of the University of Florida
- In office 1999–2003
- Preceded by: John V. Lombardi
- Succeeded by: Bernie Machen

4th Chancellor of the University of California, Los Angeles
- In office 1968–1997
- Preceded by: Franklin David Murphy
- Succeeded by: Albert Carnesale

Personal details
- Born: Charles Edward Young; December 30, 1931 Highland, California, U.S.
- Died: October 22, 2023 (aged 91) Sonoma, California, U.S.
- Spouses: Sue Daugherty (m. 1950; died 2001) Judy Cornell (m. 2002)
- Children: 2
- Education: UC Riverside (BA); UCLA (MA, PhD)
- Occupation: University professor; university chancellor; nonprofit administrator

Charles Edward Young (December 30, 1931 – October 22, 2023), nicknamed Chuck Young, was an American university administrator and professor. A native of California, Young led the University of California, Los Angeles (UCLA) for 29 years as chancellor and the University of Florida for more than four years as president.

== Early life and education ==
Young was born in Highland, California, on December 30, 1931. As a youth he worked in the local orange groves. He served in the U.S. Air Force during the Korean War. After completing his military service, he earned a Bachelor of Arts degree, with honors, in political science from the University of California, Riverside in 1955. While he was at UCR, he was the campus's first student body president. He received his Master of Arts and Doctor of Philosophy degrees in political science from UCLA in 1957 and 1960, respectively. His dissertation is titled "The politics of political boundary making". He worked for University of California President Clark Kerr in 1959 and 1960 on the California Master Plan for Higher Education.

== Career ==
=== University of California, Los Angeles ===
Young began his UCLA career in a series of executive posts in the administration of Chancellor Franklin D. Murphy: assistant to the chancellor (1960–62), assistant chancellor (1962–63), and vice chancellor for administration (1963–68). He also became a full professor in the political science department. Following Chancellor Murphy's resignation, Young was named his successor by the UC Regents on July 12, 1968. At 36, he was the nation's youngest head of a major university.

Under his leadership as chancellor from 1968 to 1997, UCLA became one of the top 10 research universities in the country, student enrollment increased from almost 29,000 to more than 35,000, and the number of faculty doubled. The operating budget grew from $170 million to $2 billion. Private gifts grew from $6.2 million in 1968 to $190.8 million in 1995–1996, at that point the highest total ever reached by a UC campus. Near the end of his time in office, Young led a $1.2 billion fund-raising drive for UCLA, at the time the most ambitious ever attempted by a public university.

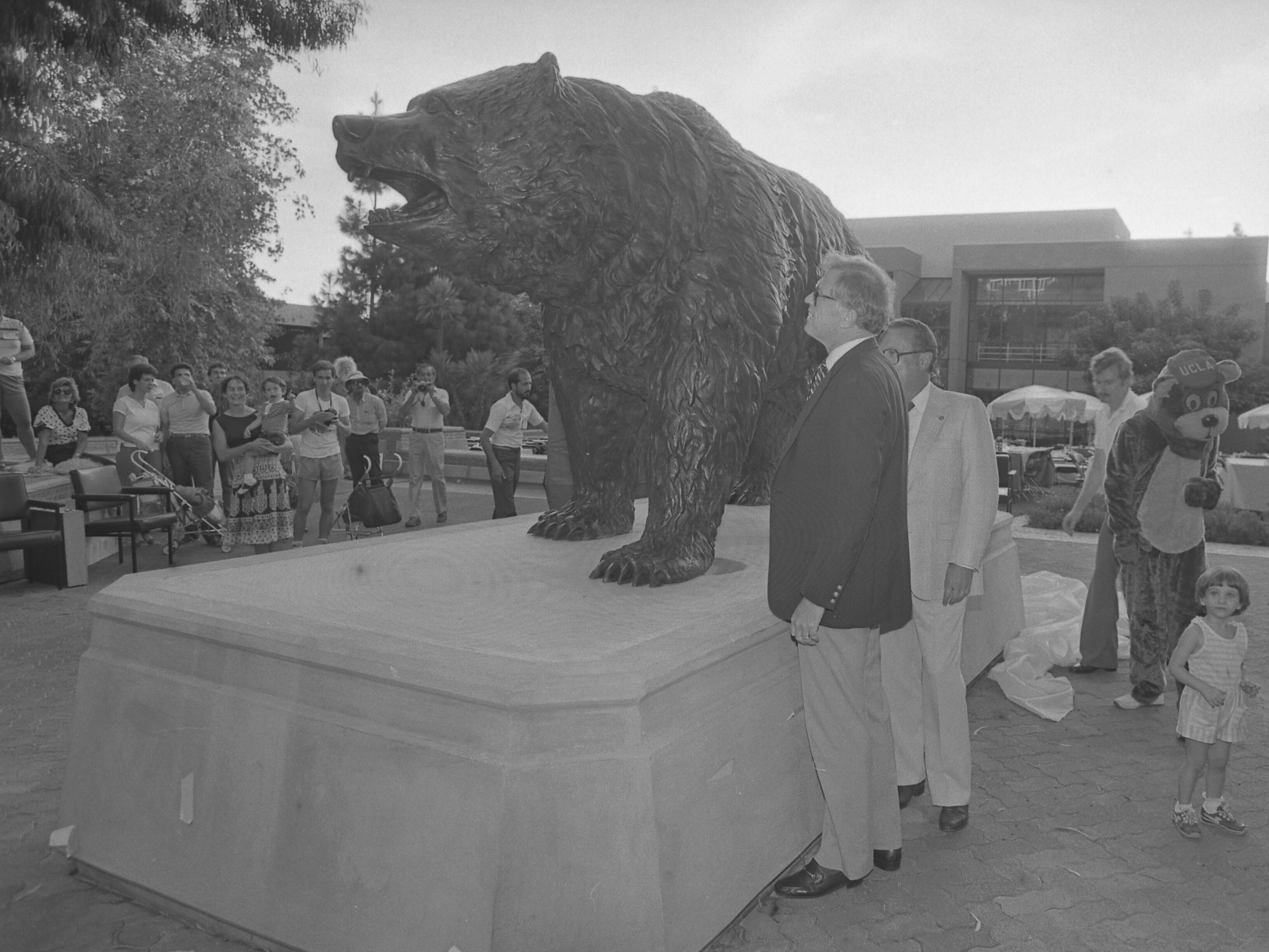
Young viewing the Bruin Bear in 1984

Academic milestones during Young's tenure include UCLA's admission to membership in the Association of American Universities (1974), a top five ranking of graduate programs from the Conference Board of the Associated Research Councils (1982), and a number three ranking among university research libraries (1994–95). The Library grew from 2.8 million volumes in 1968 to 6.8 million in 1996–1997. Faculty recognition included a Nobel Prize in Chemistry (Donald Cram, 1987), six National Medal of Science recipients (1970, 1989, 1993, 1994, 1996), and four MacArthur Foundation Fellows (1985, 1986, 1994, 1995).

Twice in his UCLA career Young led major academic restructuring efforts. In 1988, his proposal created the School of Theater, Film and Television and the School of the Arts, replacing the College of Fine Arts. In 1994, his professional school restructuring effort resulted in the disestablishment of three schools: the Graduate School of Library and Information Science, the Graduate School of Architecture and Urban Planning, and the School of Social Welfare. Library science became part of the Graduate School of Education and Information Studies. Architecture became part of the School of the Arts and Architecture. Urban planning and social welfare, along with a new public policy unit, became departments in the new School of Public Policy and Social Research (now the Luskin School of Public Affairs).

UCLA also became known for the ethnic diversity of its student body during Young's tenure. The year before Young took office, the percentage of minority students at UCLA was estimated at 12%. The year after he retired, the percentage of minority students was 54%. Young was a vocal supporter of affirmative action, the development and recruitment of minority faculty, and the establishment of ethnic studies centers for African American, Chicano, Asian American and American Indian cultures. In 1978, he announced a joint program with Charles R. Drew University of Medicine and Science to train physicians to work in the inner city.

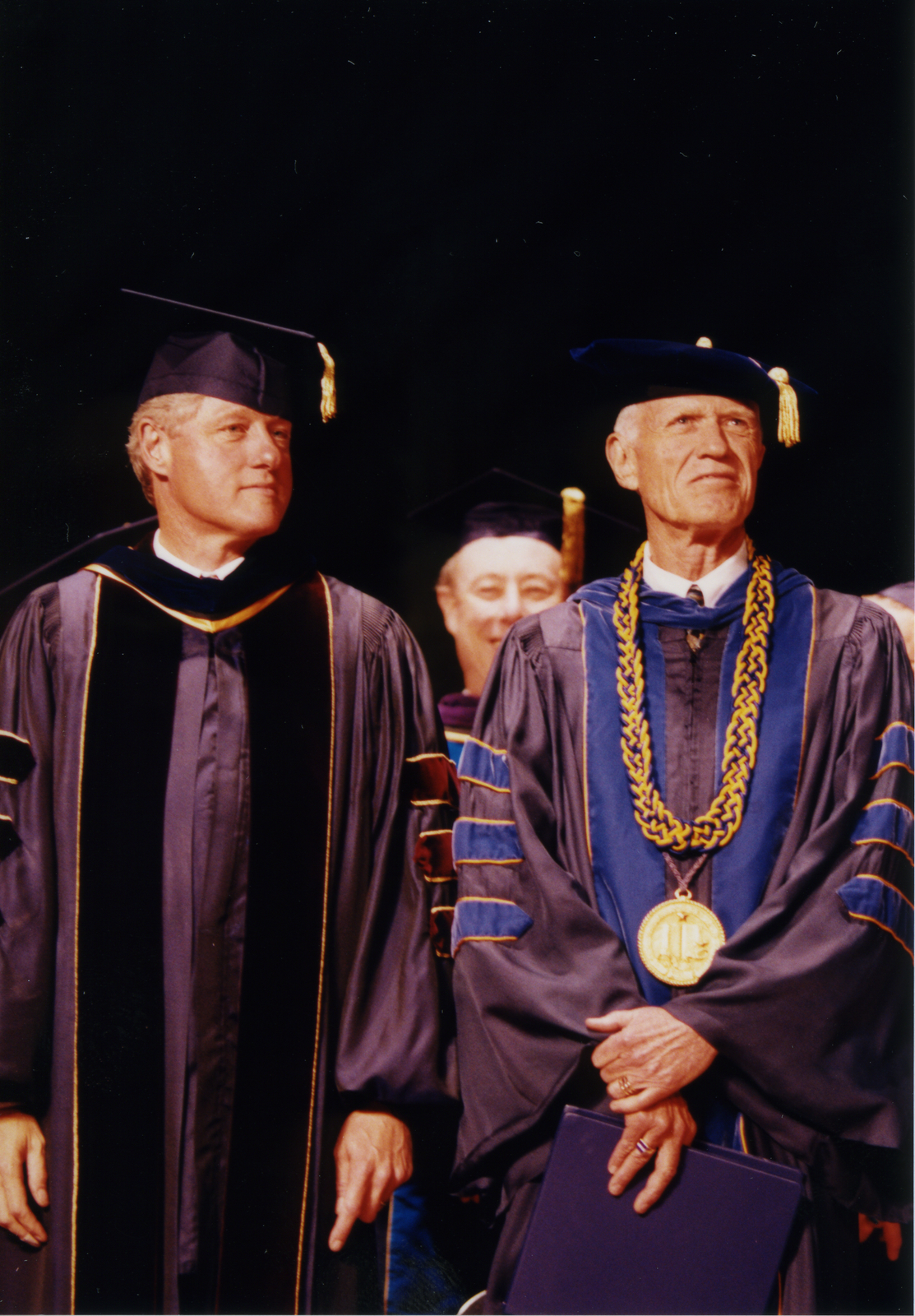
President Bill Clinton and Young at UCLA in 1994

Young was active in a wide range of issues involving intercollegiate athletics. In an era when the NCAA called Title IX requirements for women's athletics "Extreme", Young voluntarily expanded UCLA women's athletics even before the requirements went into effect, adding 11 varsity programs for women in 1974. During Young's time at UCLA (fall 1968 through spring 1997) UCLA women won 14 NCAA team championships. Men's teams won another 47 trophies for a total of 61. As chair of the Pac-8's President and Chancellors group, Young led the effort to add the University of Arizona and Arizona State University to the conference. He announced the new Pac-10 in 1978. In 1988, Young helped to negotiate a lucrative ABC television contract for the Rose Bowl game. Young was also a vocal leader of reform efforts as a member of the American Council on Education (ACE), the NCAA Presidents Commission and the Knight Commission. His ACE committee recommended limitations on recruiting and stronger satisfactory-progress legislation.

In 1992, Young announced that UCLA would manage the Hammer Museum. "It has been the long-term goal of UCLA to build the finest arts program of any major research university in the country", Young said. "I think we are well on our way with this proposed agreement with the Hammer Museum." The arrangement was finalized in 1994. That year Young hosted President Bill Clinton at a convocation celebrating UCLA's 75th anniversary.

At his departure in 1997, Young was the longest-serving college leader in American higher education. For his service, the Young Research Library at UCLA bears his name, as well as Charles E. Young Drive, an important loop road inside campus. He was also a former chairman of the Association of American Universities (1983), and served on several commissions including those of the International Association of Universities, American Council on Education, the National Association of State Universities and Land-Grant Colleges, the Business Higher Education Forum, and the Mansfield Center for Pacific Affairs.

Young was a strong supporter and adviser to the arts, business, education, finance, technology and health care industries. He was selected to a number of boards of directors for companies in the finance, technology, and healthcare industries. These boards include Intel Corp., Nicholas-Applegate Capital Management, the Academy of Television Arts and Sciences Foundation, and the Los Angeles World Affairs Council. He was also a member of the Board of Directors of the Los Angeles Olympic Organizing Committee for the 1984 Summer Olympics.

=== University of Florida ===
On November 1, 1999, Young became the tenth president of the University of Florida. He initially served on an interim basis, but his popularity with the faculty and University of Florida Trustees led to a permanent appointment. He served until 2004.

=== Qatar Foundation ===
Young served as president of the Qatar Foundation from 2004 to 2006. Located in Qatar, a small peninsula on the west coast of the Persian Gulf, the foundation defines its vision in these words: "Through education and research, Qatar Foundation leads human, social, and economic development of Qatar; making Qatar a nation that can be a vanguard for productive change in the region and a role model for the broader international community." As president of the foundation, Young also oversaw other centers run directly by it, including an academy for students ages 3 to 18, an economic development center and a stable for Arabian horses.

=== Los Angeles Museum of Contemporary Art ===
On December 23, 2008, the board of trustees of the Los Angeles Museum of Contemporary Art announced that Young had been appointed chief executive officer of the museum. In that capacity, Young oversaw the museum's business operations while a separate director was responsible for artistic decisions. He presided over the museum's stabilization, completing his appointment in 2010.

=== Political stances ===
==== Angela Davis ====
The Los Angeles Times wrote: "If anything made his reputation, it was his defense of acting professor Angela Davis, a Communist whose politics drew the ire of UC regents. In a test of wills, Young refused to fire her. The regents finally did it themselves."

==== Chicano studies hunger strike ====
In 1993 a 14-day hunger strike in support of Chicano studies ended in a compromise solution, without official departmental status but with additional resources and a new name, the Cesar Chavez Center. "I'm glad it's over and I hope they get back to class and get back to their other activities and that we will have an opportunity to see this program become the great center, the great program, in Chicano studies we all want it to be", UCLA Chancellor Charles E. Young said.

==== Support for affirmative action ====
Young clashed with the UC Regents over his support for affirmative action policies. In a speech before the UCLA Academic Senate, he defended the use of race and ethnicity in admissions. "The result is that UCLA enrolls the highest qualified students from all ethnic groups, all income levels, all family backgrounds, all life experiences," he said. "And all of them are qualified to be here." According to the Los Angeles Times: "After Young spoke, faculty members greeted him with warm applause and several rose to express their gratitude for what one professor called Young's leadership role." He was also vocal in his support for affirmative action at the University of Florida. "Charles E. Young, president of the University of Florida, was the loudest dissenting voice to [Jeb] Bush's plan. Young believed the policy was being imposed for entirely political reasons and was developed rapidly without involvement from those in the education community."

== Honors ==
Young was a fellow of the American Academy of Arts & Sciences from 1994. He received the UCLA Medal in 1998. The first alumnus ever to lead UCLA, Young received the Edward A. Dickson Alumnus of the Year Award from the UCLA Alumni Association in 1994. He received the Distinguished Alumnus Award from the UC Riverside Alumni Association in 1986. In 1997, UCLA's University Research Library was renamed in his honor.

== Personal life ==
Young met Sue Daugherty when they were students at San Bernardino Valley College. They married in 1950 and had two children, Charles Jr. and Elizabeth. Sue died in 2001. In 2002, Young married Judy Cornell. His daughter, Elizabeth Young-Apstein, died in 2006.

Young and his wife retired to Sonoma, California, to be near family. He died at home in Sonoma on October 22, 2023, at age 91.

== See also ==
- History of the University of California, Los Angeles
- History of the University of Florida
- List of University of California, Los Angeles people
- List of University of Florida presidents

== Bibliography ==
- Collison, Craig, The Fight to Legitimize Blackness: How Black Students Changed the University. Dissertation, University of Washington (2008).
- Dundjerski, Marina. UCLA: The First Century. London, Los Angeles, CA: Third Millennium Pub. UCLA History Project/UCLA Alumni Association (2011). ISBN 1906507376
- Pleasants, Julian M., Gator Tales: An Oral History of the University of Florida, University of Florida, Gainesville, Florida (2006). ISBN 0-8130-3054-4.
- Van Ness, Carl, & Kevin McCarthy, Honoring the Past, Shaping the Future: The University of Florida, 1853–2003, University of Florida, Gainesville, Florida (2003).
