= Page Ackerman =

American librarian (1912–2006)

- Born: June 30, 1912; Evanston, Illinois, U.S.
- Died: February 28, 2006 (aged 93); Duarte, California, U.S.
- Occupation: Librarian

Page Ackerman (June 30, 1912 – February 28, 2006) was an American librarian that received recognition for her work. She worked at the University of California, Los Angeles, for a few decades, and then she became a professor in UCLA's Graduate School of Library and Information Science.

== Personal life and death ==
Ackerman was born on June 30, 1912, in Evanston, Illinois, and moved to Santa Monica, California, with her parents. In 1929, Ackerman attended the University of California at its then-recently built Westwood campus. She attended Agnes Scott College in Georgia as a junior by transferring using a physical education scholarship, and she graduated from there in 1933 with a Bachelor of Arts degree in English. Ackerman then attended the University of North Carolina at Chapel Hill (UNC), from which she graduated in 1940 with a Bachelor of Arts degree in library science.

Ackerman died on February 28, 2006, from congestive heart failure in Duarte, California.

== Career ==
After completing her education, Ackerman began working at the Columbia Theological Seminary in Decatur and she left the position in 1943. During the same year, Ackerman was the post librarian at the U.S. Army Aberdeen Proving Ground in Maryland. Due to her working there, she became friends with astronomer Edwin Hubble and his wife, Grace. Ackerman received regimental review and a citation for Meritorious Service at the end of her time in the position. She became an assistant librarian in Richmond, Virginia, at the Union Theological Seminary, and she held that position from 1945 to 1949. Ackerman became the assistant university librarian at the University of California, Los Angeles (UCLA) in 1954, the associate university librarian in 1965, and the university librarian from 1973 until 1977. During her time at UCLA, she created the library's administrative network, and the network became a model for such systems across the United States. She worked on a university-wide catalog, improved selection, regional storage facilities, and acquiring extensive significant collections. Ackerman was in charge of taking care of the university's 3 million volumes and almost 500 staff. She was a part of the American Library Association (ALA) Council, and the ALA Committee on Organization.

From 1973 to 1977 and from 1982 to 1983, Ackerman was a professor in UCLA's Graduate School of Library and Information Science. Ackerman had an important part in the creating the Frances Clark Sayers Lectureship. She also worked as a visiting librarian at the University of California, Berkeley and a consultant of university libraries in California, Arizona, Florida, and Hawaii. During her tenure as university librarian, Ackerman was the first woman on the Association of Research Libraries' board of directors.

== Reception and awards ==
In 1973, Ackerman received a Distinguished Alumnus Award from UNC during University Day. She was the second woman to receive the award during the University Day ceremonies. The Chapel Hill News said that Ackerman was "one of the foremost woman librarians in the nation." Ackerman won the Status of Women Award from the American Association of University Women, the Agnes Scott College's Outstanding Alumna Award for Distinguished Career, and a Distinguished Career Citation from the Association of College and Research Libraries. A two-volume biography of interviews with Ackerman was published in 1995, and it is held in the Charles E. Young Research Library.
