= Heinrich von Ficker =

Austrian meteorologist

- Born: 22 November 1881; Munich (German Empire)
- Died: 29 April 1957 (aged 75); Vienna (Austria)
- Alma mater: University of Innsbruck
- Occupation: Meteorologist & Geophysicist
- Employer: Central Institution for Meteorology and Geodynamics (1937–1953)
- Parent(s): Julius von Ficker
- Family: Rudolf von Ficker
- Awards: honorary doctorate of the University of Natural Resources and Life Sciences, Vienna (1951)

Heinrich von Ficker (22 November 1881 – 29 April 1957) was a German-Austrian meteorologist and geophysicist who was a native of Munich. He was the son of historian Julius von Ficker (1826–1902).

== Career ==
From 1911 he was a professor of meteorology at the University of Graz, and from 1923 to 1937 was a professor at the University of Berlin. During his tenure at Berlin, he also spent several years as director of the Prussian Meteorological Institute. From 1937 until his retirement in 1952, he was a professor at University of Vienna and director of the Zentralanstalt für Meteorologie und Geodynamik (Central Institution for Meteorology and Geodynamics) (ZAMG).

In 1906 and 1910, while based in Innsbruck, Ficker performed extensive scientific studies involving the dynamics of Alpine foehn winds. With biometeorologist Bernhard de Rudder (1894–1962), he was the author of the treatise Föhn und Föhnwirkungen (Foehn and Foehn Effects). Ficker was also responsible for important research of cold fronts and heat waves that occur in Russia and northern Asia.
