= Franklin David Murphy =

American academic administrator (1916–1994)

Franklin Murphy
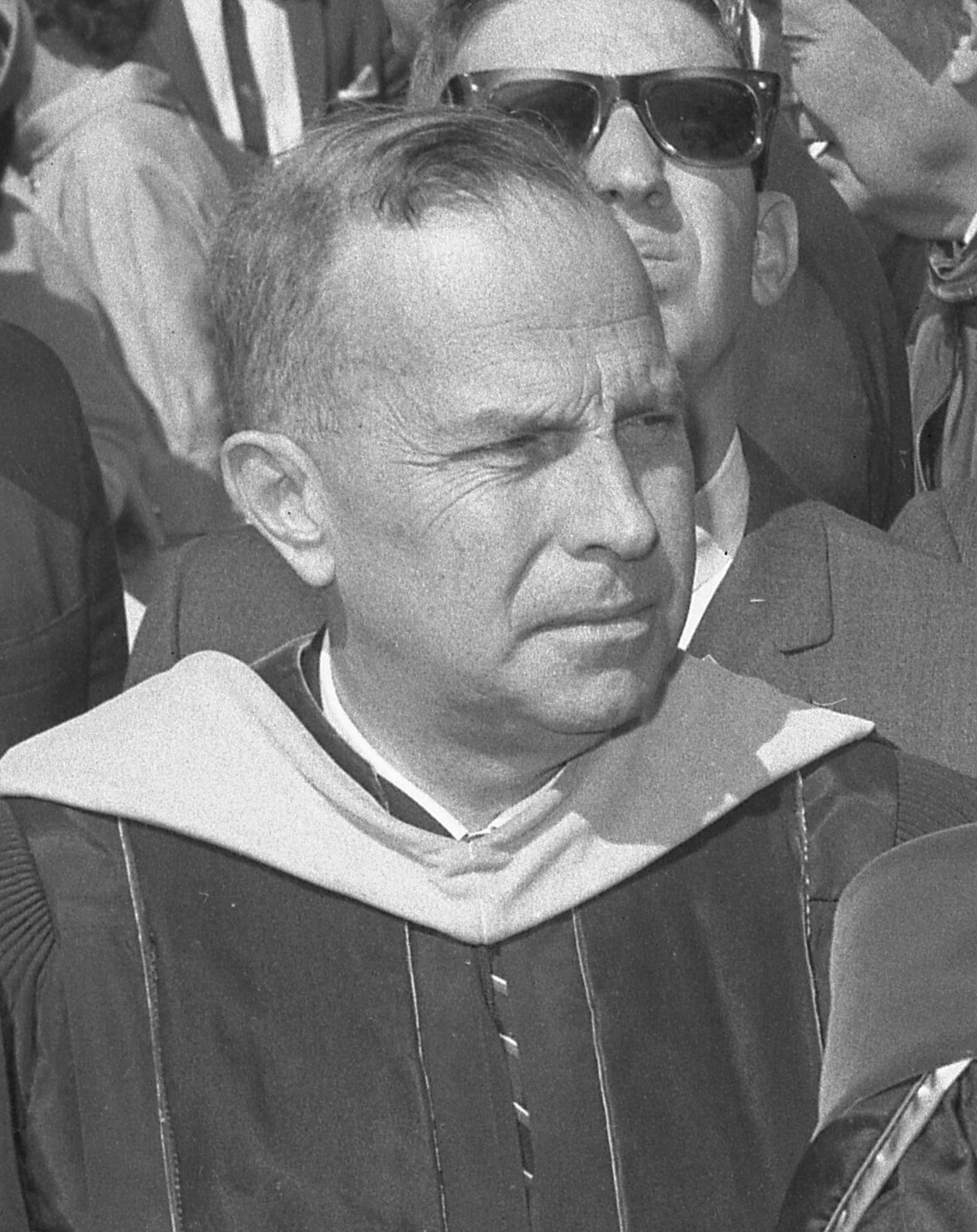
- Murphy in 1964

3rd Chancellor of the University of California, Los Angeles
- In office 1960–1968
- Preceded by: Vern Oliver Knudsen
- Succeeded by: Charles E. Young

9th Chancellor of the University of Kansas
- In office 1951–1960
- Preceded by: Deane Waldo Malott
- Succeeded by: W. Clarke Wescoe

Personal details
- Born: March 14, 1916 Kansas City, Missouri, U.S.
- Died: June 16, 1994 (aged 78) Los Angeles, California, U.S.
- Education: University of Kansas (BS); University of Pennsylvania (MD)

Franklin David Murphy (January 29, 1916 – June 16, 1994) was an American administrator, educator, and medical doctor. During his life, he served as Chancellor of the University of Kansas (KU) and Chancellor of the University of California, Los Angeles (UCLA).

== Biography ==
=== Early life ===
Murphy was born in Kansas City, Missouri in 1916 where he attended the Pembroke-Country Day School. He graduated Phi Beta Kappa from the University of Kansas in 1936, and then earned his Doctor of Medicine from the University of Pennsylvania School of Medicine in 1941. After graduation, he served in the United States Army Medical Corps during World War II, where he became a captain. Afterward, he returned to Kansas City to practice cardiology, and began teaching at the University of Kansas School of Medicine in Kansas City, Kansas.

=== Career ===
Within a few years of beginning his professorship at the University of Kansas, he became dean of the medical school and eventually was chosen by the Kansas Board of Regents to be chancellor of the entire university. Because of his successes at KU, UCLA asked him to become their chancellor. In 1960, when his relationship with Kansas Governor George Docking was no longer tolerable, he accepted the position and relocated to Los Angeles, California. There, he was also appointed to be a professor of medical history.

At UCLA, he dealt with the turbulence of student movements in the 1960s in a progressive manner, and successfully kept the university stable. Moreover, he worked to establish the university as a first-rate institution in its own right, and not simply a branch of the vast University of California system. He expanded the UCLA library system, enlarged the School of Medicine's basic science programs, convinced the regents of the University of California to purchase and maintain a cyclotron for the school, and founded the Jules Stein Eye Institute and a museum now known as the Fowler Museum at UCLA. In 1968, he resigned his position as chancellor in order to become chairman and CEO of the Times Mirror Company, remaining in Los Angeles. He continued in this position until 1980, and remained a director of the company until he retired in 1986.

=== Personal life ===
After his retirement, he became a major philanthropist in Los Angeles for the rest of his life. He served on many philanthropic boards, including the Los Angeles County Museum of Art and the Los Angeles Music Center, raising funds and public awareness of the institutions.

Murphy died in Los Angeles in 1994.

== Legacy ==
The Franklin D. Murphy Sculpture Garden at UCLA, which he founded, still remains a world-famous permanent sculpture exhibition; Murphy Hall, which houses UCLA administration and admissions, has also been named in his honor. At the University of Kansas, both Murphy Hall and the Murphy Art and Architecture Library are named in his honor.
