= Charles E. Young Research Library =

Library at University of California, Los Angeles (UCLA)

Coordinates: 34.074920°N 118.441539°W

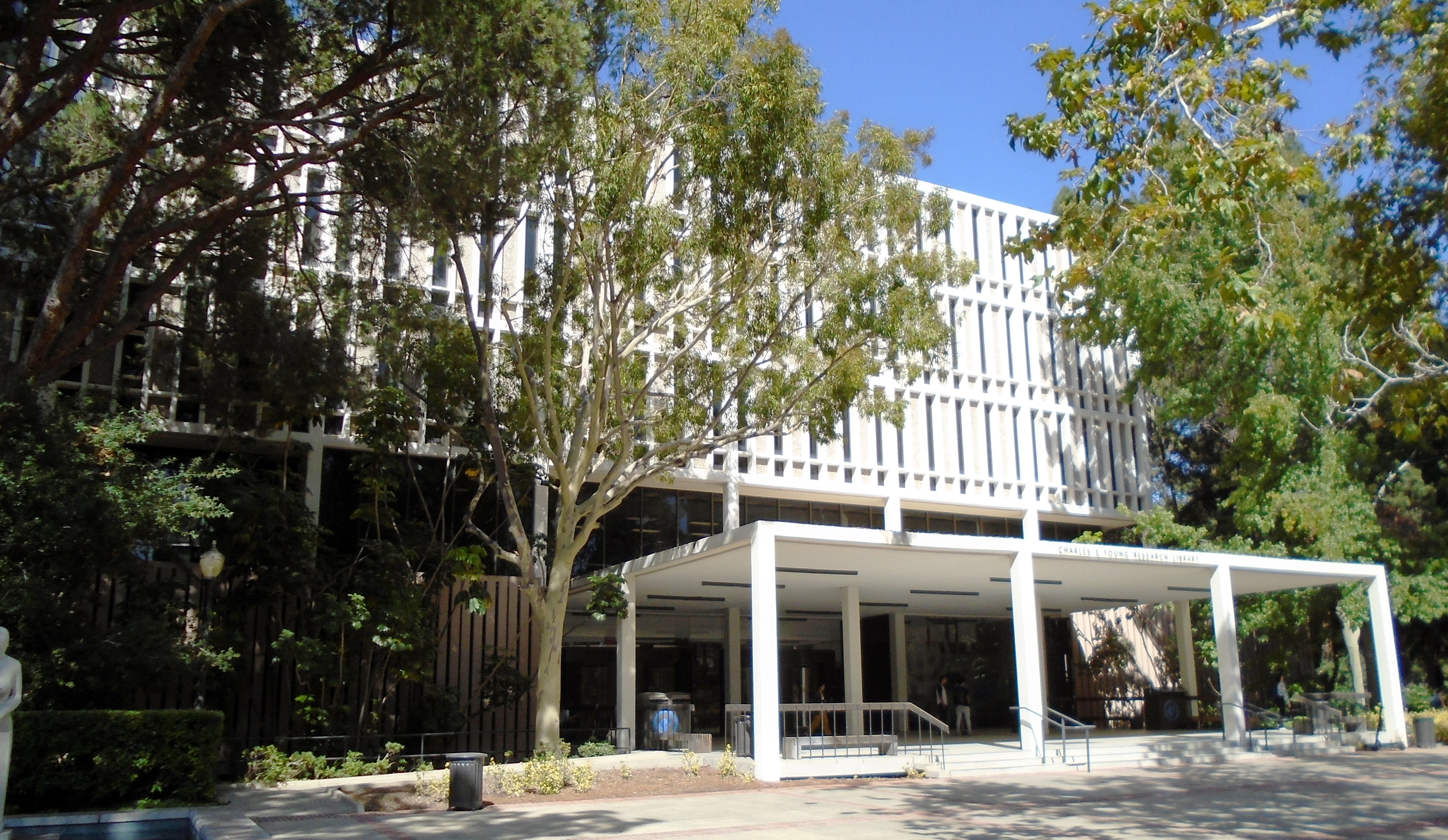
The Charles E. Young Research Library

The Charles E. Young Research Library is one of the largest libraries on the campus of the University of California, Los Angeles in Westwood, Los Angeles, California. It initially opened in 1964, and a second phase of construction was completed in 1970. Interior renovations took place in 2009 and 2011.

Located at the northern edge of the campus, the building was designed by A. Quincy Jones and Frederick Earl Emmons in the Mid-Century Modern style. Jones was the dean of USC's School of Architecture from 1951 to 1967. The building features a concrete skeleton, dark glass windows and deep floorplate.

The upper floors of the library are meant primarily for faculty and graduate students who wish to conduct research. The library holds resources in the humanities, social sciences, education, public affairs, government information, journals, newspapers, and maps.

== History ==
Designed by architects A. Quincy Jones and Frederick Earl Emmons, the eastern half of the building opened in 1964, and the western half in 1970. Originally called the "University Research Library", in 1997 it was named for Charles E. Young, the university's second-longest serving chancellor (29 years). The building underwent major interior renovations in 2009 (A level) and 2011 (first floor), designed by Perkins and Will.

According to Metropolis Magazine, "In 1950, the late Ray Bradbury – a dedicated autodidact who spent three days a week at libraries in lieu of enrolling in college—entered the typewriter-rental room in the basement of UCLA’s Powell Library. With a roll of dimes and the kernel of a story, he holed up in front of a Royal typewriter and pounded out Fahrenheit 451, the cri de coeur for the importance of books that launched his long career. All it took was nine days and 98 dimes." As part of renovations of the building's common areas, the library's cafe was named "Cafe 451", and a Bradbury quote was painted in a frequently used stairwell: "Without libraries, what have we? We have no past, and no future."

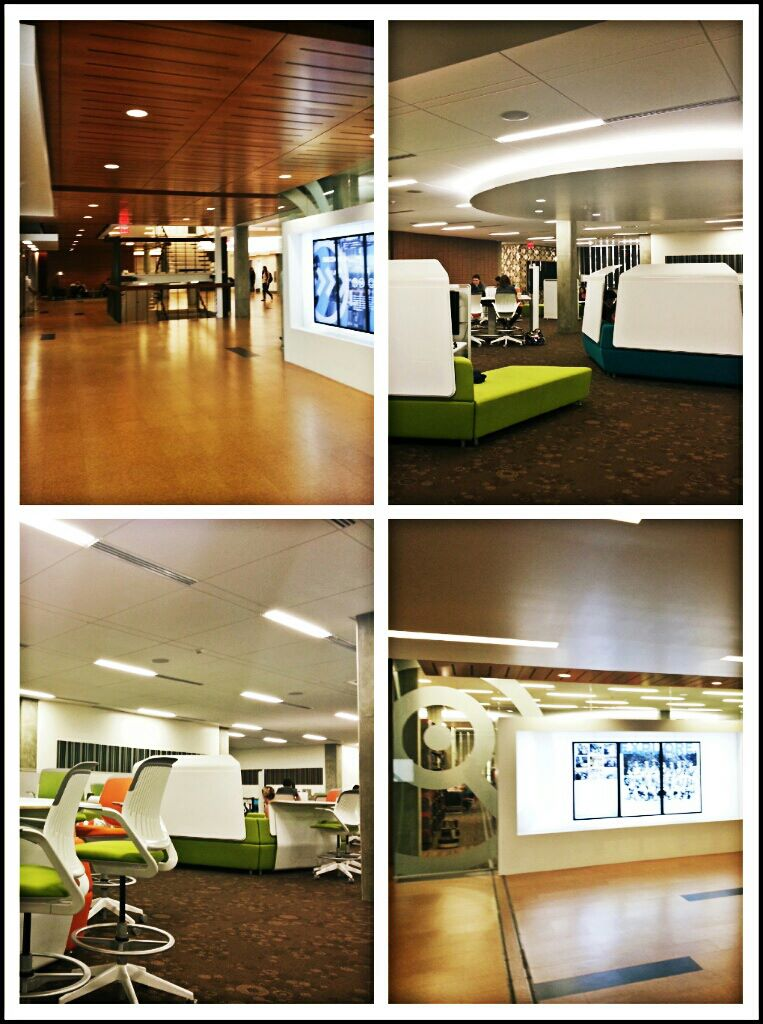
Inside the Charles E. Young Research Library

== Renovations ==
When Perkins and Will Architects undertook the renovation of the library's common areas – the traditional book stacks on the upper floors were not touched – they began meeting with different constituent groups to get a sense of what they would like to see in the new space, but the main impetus for a wholesale transformation came from UCLA University Librarian Gary Strong and Deputy University Librarian Susan Parker, both of whom understood the importance of introducing technology and collaborative thinking to the world of academic research.

Because this is an A. Quincy Jones building, preservation was considered to be important. While the team retained the signature open staircase that runs through three floors of the building, they also added a scrolling ticker whose continuously scrolling text reminds users that there are floors above and below to explore. The original load-bearing concrete columns, which are spaced every 20 feet, were stripped of paint in order to expose the imprint of wood forms.

The library's new research commons feature 22 technology-enabled "pods" capable of accommodating up to 10 users each. The area has been built specifically to encourage interdisciplinary collaboration and discovery through serendipity. Each pod allows students and faculty to share content on laptops and other devices on large LCD monitors.

== See also ==
- UCLA Library
