= Rudolf von Ficker =

Austrian musicologist (1886–1954)

- Born: 11 June 1886; Munich, Germany
- Died: 2 August 1954 (aged 68); Igls, Austria
- Other name: Rudolf Ritter Ficker von Feldhaus

Academic background
- Education: University of Vienna

Academic work
- Discipline: musicology
- Institutions: University of Innsbruck; University of Vienna
- Main interests: medieval music
- Notable works: Denkmäler der Tonkunst in Österreich

Rudolf (von) Ficker (until 1919, Rudolf Ritter Ficker von Feldhaus; 11 June 1886 – 2 August 1954) was an Austrian musicologist.

== Life ==
Rudolf von Ficker was the son of the historian Julius von Ficker and brother of author/publisher Ludwig von Ficker and meteorologist/physicist Heinrich von Ficker. In 1905, he began his composition studies with Ludwig Thuille and Walter Courvoisier in Munich. He then continued his music studies with the musicologist Guido Adler in the Department of Music at the University of Vienna, where he received his doctorate in 1913. He habilitated at the University of Innsbruck in 1920, and in 1922 and 1923, he was appointed associate professor at the University of Innsbruck. There he established the study and teaching materials library, which in 1926 became the Department of Music.

In 1927, Ficker accepted a position, as co-chair with R. Lach, in the Department of Music in Vienna, and in 1927, he organized the performances of "Musik der Gotik" on the occasion of the centenary celebrations of the death of Beethoven. From 1928 to 1938, he was a member of the executive board of the Monuments of Fine Austrian Music (DTÖ, Denkmäler der Tonkunst in Österreich, cf. also IMSLP article). From 1927 to 1931, he was a member of the directorate of the International Musicological Society. He was the successor to Adolf Sandberger as professor and head of the Music Department at the Ludwig-Maximilians-Universität München beginning in 1931.

In 1948, Ficker returned to Innsbruck. His work concentrated on Medieval Music, and he is considered to be a pioneer scholar in research in this area. With Adler, Ficker was co-author of the 83-volume work "Denkmäler der Tonkunst in Österreich" (cf. above). Ficker achieved international recognition with his researches on the Trent Codices, whose seventh volume (TrentM 93) he discovered. His scholarly estate is located at the Brenner Archives Research Institute of the University of Innsbruck.

== Selected works ==
- "Die Chromatik im italienischen Madrigal des 16. Jahrhunderts", dissertation, Vienna 1913.
- "Beiträge zur Chromatik des 14. bis 16. Jahrhunderts", in: "StMw" 2 (1914).
- "Die Kolorierungstechnik der Trienter Messen", in: "StMw" 7 (1920).
- "Primäre Klangformen", in: "Jahrbuch der Musikbibliothek Peters" (1929).
- "Polyphonic Music of the Gothic Period". The Musical Quarterly. XV (4): 483–505. October 1929. doi:10.1093/mq/XV.4.483.
- "Guido Adler und die Wiener Schule der Musikwissenschaft", in: "ÖMZ" 1 (1946).
- "Epilog zum Faburdon", in: "Acta Musicologica", vol. 25, issue 4 (Oct.-Dez. 1953), S. 127–131.
- "The Transition on the Continent", in: "New Oxford History of Music" 3 (1960).
- "Die Grundlagen der abendländischen Mehrstimmigkeit" (incomplete).

== Sources ==
- Jeppesen, Knud: "Rudolf von Ficker in Memoriam", in "Acta Musicologica", vol. 26, issue ¾ (Aug.-Dec. 1954), pp. 65–66.
- "Rudolf Ficker." In: Rudolf Flotzinger (ed.): "Oesterreichisches Musiklexikon." Verlag der Österreichischen Akademie der Wissenschaften, Wien 2002, (volume 1), p. 443.
