= Powell Library =

Library at UCLA

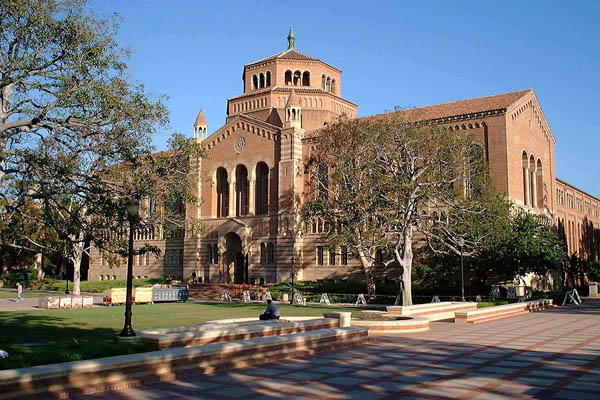
- Interactive map of the Powell Library area

General information
- Architectural style: Romanesque revival
- Location: Los Angeles, California, United States of America
- Coordinates: 34.0717°N 118.44218°W
- Construction started: 1926
- Completed: 1929
- Client: University of California, Los Angeles

Design and construction
- Architect: George W. Kelham

Website
- www.library.ucla.edu/location/powell-library

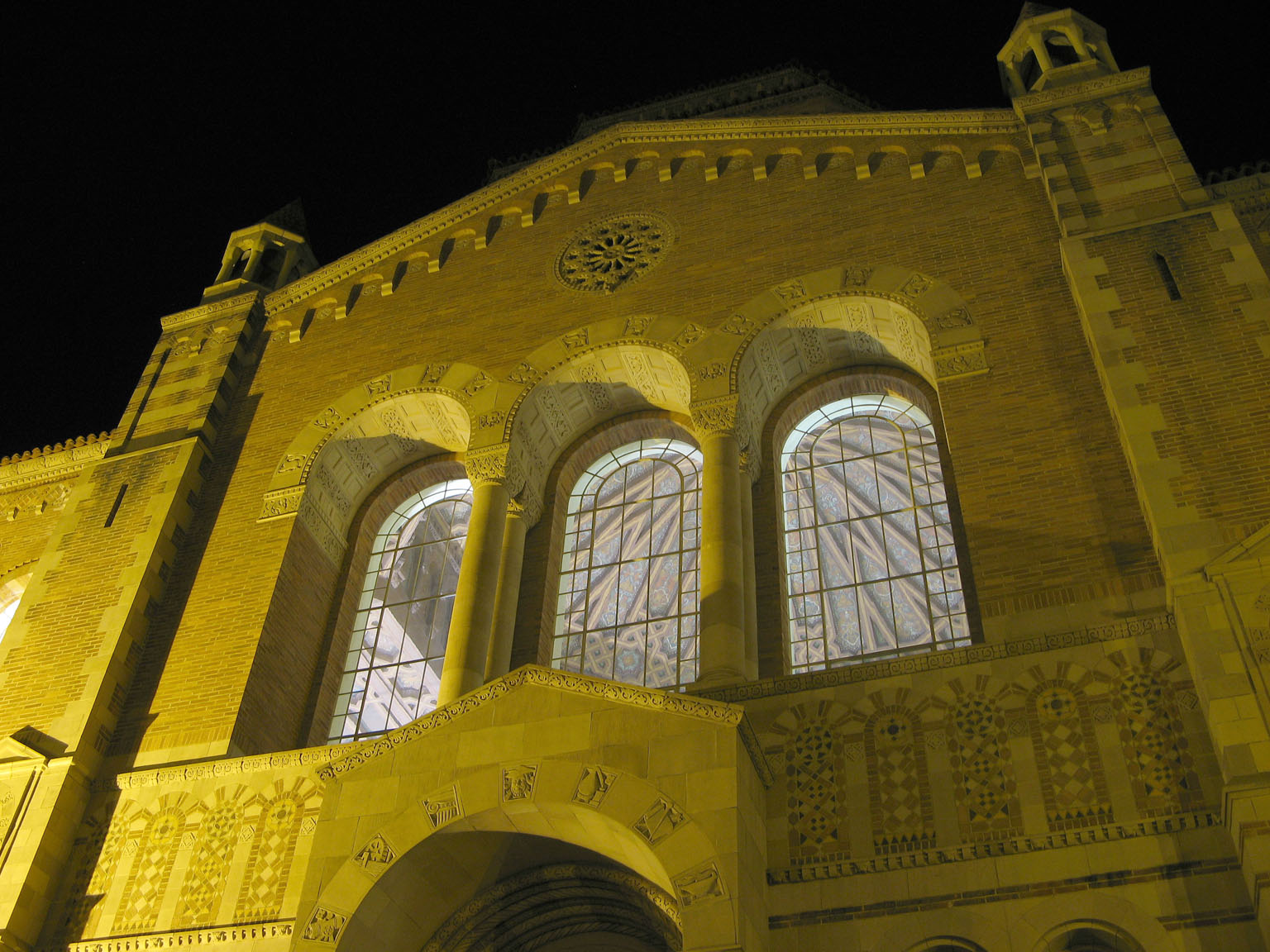
Powell at night

Powell Library is the main library on the campus of the University of California, Los Angeles (UCLA). Formerly known as the College Library, Powell Library was constructed from 1926 to 1929 and was one of the original four buildings that comprised the UCLA campus in the early period of the university's life. Its Romanesque Revival architecture design, its historic value and its popularity with students make it one of the defining images of UCLA.

== Exterior ==
Like the building facing it across the quad, Royce Hall, the building's exterior is modeled after Milan's Basilica of Sant'Ambrogio.

The entrance of the library is adorned with several mosaics, one of which depicts two men holding a book bearing the phrase, from Cicero's Pro Archia Poeta, "Haec studia adulescentiam alunt, senectutem oblectant" ("These studies nourish youth and delight old age"), an appropriate dictum for the vast collection for undergraduate students.

There are also Renaissance Printers' Marks on the ceiling of Powell's Main Reading Room, which is located on the second floor of the building.

The exterior (front facade on the north) of the building consists of two wings and a higher central tower in the middle. The central tower is topped by an octagonal dome with arched balconies housing electrical bell speakers near the top. The dome itself is topped by a copper cupola with a ball finial.

== History ==
The library is named for Lawrence Clark Powell, the University Librarian at UCLA from 1944 to 1961 and Dean of the Graduate School of Library Service from 1960 to 1966. It is part of the extensive UCLA Library system. The Graduate School of Library and Information Science, as GSLS was later known, was housed for many years in the southwestern corner of the top floor. During this period the building also contained a separate unit of the campus library system devoted to education and psychology, which was later closed and its collection distributed among the other campus libraries.

In 1951, author Ray Bradbury wrote an early draft of his classic novel Fahrenheit 451 in Powell Library using typewriters that were then available for rent.

Students at UCLA have affectionately called this library "Club Powell" because it has a reputation for being louder than most libraries. Others explain that it is because this library has a room called Night Powell that is open 24/7 beginning on third week. Currently, the whole library is open 24/7 during tenth and finals week. Powell hosts de-stressor programs during tenth and finals week, which include providing snacks and bringing therapy dogs, origami stations, and other stress-reducing activities to the library. Located in the second floor Rotunda, this UCLA library often hosts events. Past events include the Edible Book Festival, Silent Disco, Video Game Orchestra, and International Games Day.

Powell was also home of the "Powell Cat," a stray cat spotted in 2015 near Powell who became an unofficial mascot of the library. The cat passed in 2023 and a statue was installed in 2025 to honor its memory.

== Services ==
Staff at Powell Library provide research help in person during set hours and through a 24/7 chat help service.

== See also ==
- Royce Hall
- Charles E. Young Research Library
- UCLA Library
- Maine East High School
