= Julius von Ficker =

German historian (1826–1902)

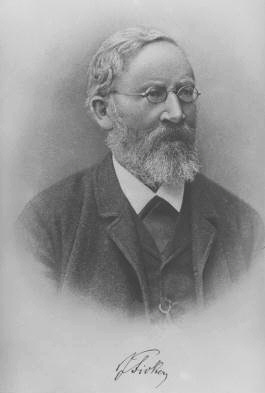
Julius von Ficker

Julius Ficker or Julius von Ficker or Johann Kaspar Julius Ficker von Feldhaus (30 April 1826 – 10 June 1902) was a Roman Catholic German historian. In 1898 he was awarded the Pour le Mérite for Sciences and Arts.

== Career ==
Born at Paderborn, Ficker studied history and law at Bonn, Münster, and Berlin, and during 1848-49 lived in Frankfurt, where he was closely associated with the noted historian Johann Friedrich Böhmer, who proved himself a generous friend and patron. In 1852 he proceeded to Bonn, but shortly afterwards accepted an invitation from Count Leopold Thun-Hohenstein, the reorganizer of the Austrian system of education, to settle at Innsbruck as professor of general history. In 1863, however, he joined the faculty of jurisprudence, and his lectures on political and legal history drew around him a large circle of devoted and admiring pupils. In 1866 he was elected member of the Austrian Academy of Sciences, but retired, after being ennobled by the Emperor of Austria, Franz Joseph, in 1879.

== The Sybel-Ficker controversy ==
During the period 1859–1866, triggered by the publication of Giesebrecht's Geschichte der deutschen Kaiserzeit, he was engaged in a literary controversy with the historian Heinrich von Sybel on the significance of the Holy Roman Empire. Ficker advocated and defended the theory that Austria, on account of its blending of races, was best fitted as successor of the old empire to secure the political advancement of both Central Europe and of Germany. In support of his theory, he wrote Das deutsche Kaiserreich in seinen universalen und nationalen Beziehungen (Innsbruck, 1861), and Deutsches Königtum und Kaisertum (Innsbruck, 1862). As legatee of Böhmer's literary estate, he published the Acta Imperii selecta (Innsbruck, 1870) and directed the completion and revision of the Regesta Imperii.

== Death and legacy ==
Julius von Ficker died in Innsbruck in 1902, aged 76. His sons were also prominent. Ludwig von Ficker (1880–1967) was a publisher and essayist who promoted and published the work of his friend, Georg Trakl. Heinrich von Ficker (1881–1957) was a meteorologist, geophysicist and explorer. Rudolf von Ficker (1886–1954) was a musicologist.

== Works ==
Ficker's numerous and important works extend over three branches of scientific history: political and legal history and the science of diplomatics. In each division he discovered new methods of investigation. Among his writings those of especial note are:

=== Political history ===
- Rainald von Dassel, Reichskanzler und Erzbischof von Köln (Cologne, 1850)
- Münsterische Chroniken des Mittelalters (Münster, 1851)
- Engelbert der Heilige, Erzbischof von Köln (Cologne, 1853)
- Die Überreste des deutschen Reichsarchivs in Pisa (Vienna, 1855).

=== Legal history ===
- Über einen Spiegel deutscher Leute (Vienna, 1857)
- Über die Entstehungszeit des Sachsenspiegels (Innsbruck 1859)
- Vom Reichsfürstenstande (Innsbruck, 1861)
- Forschungen zur Reichs- und Rechtsgeschichte Italiens (4 vols., Innsbruck, 1868–74)
- Untersuchungen zur Rechtsgeschichte (3 vols., Innsbruck, 1891–97).

=== Diplomatics ===
- Beiträge zur Urkundenlehre (2 vols., Innsbruck, 1877–78).
