= Theodor Mayer (historian) =

Austrian historian

Theodor Mayer (24 August 1883 – 26 November 1972) was an Austrian historian and scientific organizer. Mayer's intellectual pursuits were shaped by the ideology of Pan-Germanism. After serving as an archivist from 1906 to 1923, he assumed the role of a full professor of medieval history at various universities, including Prague (1927–1930), Giessen (1930–1934), Freiburg (1934–1938), and Marburg (1938–1942).

In his early years, he made a name for himself with works on economic and settlement history. His objective was to scientifically prove the supposed cultural superiority of the Germans. As head of the Alemannic Institute, the Baden Historical Commission, and Western Studies, he briefly played an influential role in the South-West German scientific organization in the 1930s. His primary focus was on emphasizing the "German achievements" compared to France.

Mayer resolutely embraced National Socialism. As a prominent figure in medieval studies, he sought to contribute to the intellectual mobilization and demonstrate the relevance of historical research for the nascent European order. Mayer's objective was to develop a European perspective on history that was primarily informed by German historical scholarship. This was intended to provide historical legitimacy for the National Socialist plans for reorganization. Mayer endeavored to establish a German historical institute in occupied Paris with the objective of historically substantiating the superiority of German historical scholarship in Europe. As the head of the so-called "war effort of the humanities" among medieval historians, Mayer regularly organized conferences until the end of the war. As rector in Marburg from 1939 to 1942, he was concerned with the close intertwining of science and war. From 1942, he served as president of the Reich Institute for Older German History (formerly known as Monumenta Germaniae Historica), thus holding the highest office in German-language medieval studies. Concurrently, he was head of the Prussian Historical Institute in Rome. Mayer's prudent decision to evacuate the Monumenta library from Berlin to Pommersfelden in Bavaria during the Second World War laid the foundation for the Monumenta Germaniae Historica (MGH) to be re-established in Munich.

For Mayer, the collapse of the Nazi regime in 1945 signified the conclusion of his university career and the loss of the MGH presidency. Over the subsequent years, he persistently sought reinstatement as president, yet was unsuccessful. Nevertheless, he retained a significant influence as a scientific organizer. In Constance, he established the Constance Working Group for Medieval History (1951–1958 Municipal Institute for Historical Research of the Lake Constance Region), a non-university research institution that continues to be a significant contributor to medieval studies to this day. The circle of highly accomplished academics who gathered around Mayer in Constance was guided by the conviction of developing a "crisis-proof view of history."

Mayer's concept of the Early Medieval Association of persons was a significant contribution to the development of Constitutional history. For decades, his concept of a freedom of the land or royal freedom exerted a significant influence on the West German discussion of constitutional development in the High Middle Ages.

== Life ==
=== Origin and youth ===
Theodor Mayer was born on 24 August 1883, in Neukirchen an der Enknach, Austria-Hungary. Throughout his life, he consistently emphasized his origins as an "Innviertler." His parents were Johann Nepomuk Mayer, a physician, and Maria, Wittib (née) Mayer. After completing his elementary education in Neukirchen, he attended a grammar school in Linz from 1893 to 1895. In 1895, the family relocated to Innsbruck, Mayer's mother's hometown, at her request. While attending the local grammar school, he formed a close friendship with Heinrich Ficker, the second eldest son of the historian Julius Ficker, with whom he shared the same class. This also brought Mayer, who had developed an interest in mathematics during his grammar school years, into contact with Alfons Dopsch, a regular guest at the Fickers' house in the summer of 1899. These encounters had a profound and enduring impact, ultimately influencing Mayer's decision to pursue a degree in history. He completed his Matura in Innsbruck in 1901.

Mayer had been intimately acquainted with the natural world since his youth. Like his friend Heinrich Ficker, who subsequently became a meteorologist and climatologist, he became a member of the Academic Alpine Club during his high school years and undertook numerous mountain tours. In his own words, he was "always in the lead." The profound experience of nature later also shaped Mayer's approach to science, particularly to regional history.

=== Years of study in Florence and Vienna ===
From 1901, he pursued studies in history at the Istituto di Studi Superiori in Florence, which later became the university. However, he indicated that his primary interest lay in the language and culture of Italy. One year later, he relocated to the University of Vienna. From 1903 to 1905, he completed the 25th course at the traditional Institute for Austrian Historical Research. Notable fellow students included August Ritter von Loehr, Vinzenz Samanek, Otto Stolz, and Josef Kallbrunner. His most significant academic mentors were Emil von Ottenthal, Oswald Redlich, and above all, the economic and social historian Alfons Dopsch. He dedicated his dissertation at the Institute for Austrian Historical Research to the medieval constitution of castles in Austria. He received his doctorate from Dopsch at the end of November 1905 with a thesis on the trade relations between the Upper German towns and Austria in the 15th century. The treatise was published as volume 6 of the series Research on the internal history of Austria, which Dopsch founded in 1903.

=== Archive period ===
Upon completion of his studies, Mayer initially served as a trainee at the Innsbruck State Archives from 1906 to 1907. During his tenure as an archivist, he married Johanna Stradal, who was approximately ten years his junior. His wife hailed from a wealthy upper middle-class family and was the daughter of a lawyer from Teplitz-Schönau in Bohemia. The analysis of private documents indicates that the marriage, which took place in 1911, was characterized by mutual respect and harmony. Mayer, who was baptized a Catholic, converted to Protestantism through his marriage. The couple had three children: Theodor in 1913, Hanna in 1914, and Emma in 1920.

In September 1912, Mayer was appointed Director of the Archive for Lower Austria at the age of 29. In March 1914, he successfully completed his habilitation at the University of Vienna with a thesis on administrative reform in Hungary after the Turkish period. Mayer enlisted as a volunteer in the same year and was assigned to a heavy artillery regiment. Until 1918, he served in South Tyrol, Galicia, on the Isonzo and on the Piave front, attaining the rank of first lieutenant. Upon his return from the war, he continued his work in the archive service. In 1921, he became a non-tenured associate professor at the University of Vienna. He published several articles on economic topics in the Wiener Mittag, a journal that advocated the unification of Germany and Austria.

=== Weimar Republic ===
==== Teaching in Prague (1922–1930) ====
Following Emil Werunsky's resignation, the chair of Medieval History and Historical auxiliary Sciences at the German University of Prague remained vacant from 1920. After the appointment committee's preferred candidate, Otto Stolz, declined to relocate from Tyrol, Mayer was proposed in conjunction with Hermann Aubin at the top of the appointment list. Up to that point, Mayer had only engaged with topics pertaining to Austrian history and had not yet achieved notable achievements in the field of historical auxiliary sciences. However, Prague had been part of the Habsburg monarchy just a few years earlier, and the German-speaking professors in Prague still felt a connection to Austria after 1918. With his focus on the field of Medieval Administrative and Economic History, Mayer met the expectations of the appointment committee, which desired to see greater emphasis on the History of the Late Middle Ages and Economic History. He found an advocate for his appointment in his university friend Hans Hirsch, the sole representative of the subject of medieval history and historical auxiliary sciences. In December 1922, Theodor Mayer was appointed associate professor at the German University of Prague.

He began teaching in the winter semester of 1923/24. He mainly offered lectures and tutorials on Economic history, including a regular three-hour lecture on Economic history from the summer semester of 1926. At the age of 44, he received his first full professorship in Prague in 1927. His interests shifted at the end of the 1920s, which was reflected in his lectures and publications. From 1928 onwards, settlement history issues took precedence over Economic history. Mayer had cadastral maps photographed and aerial photographs made. The Association for the History of the Germans in Bohemia, in which Mayer was involved, was intended to research the History of Bohemian settlements. As an academic teacher, he supervised 21 dissertations during his seven years of teaching in Prague, including nine on economic and settlement History topics.

==== Professorship in Giessen (1930–1934) ====
In 1930, Mayer succeeded Hermann Aubin as Professor of Medieval History in Giessen. From that point forward, his research focused on imperial, constitutional, and, most notably, regional history. He pursued similar lines of inquiry to his predecessor Aubin, investigating German colonization of the East and continuing to explore topics from his time in Prague. For instance, in the winter semester of 1933/34, he delivered a lecture on the history of German colonization in the East.

In Giessen, he also met Heinrich Büttner, whom he convinced to embrace the Middle Ages. A lifelong friendship developed between Mayer and Büttner. Mayer also maintained his relationships with German circles abroad in Giessen. Shortly after moving to Giessen, he was already chairman of the local branch of the Association for Germans Abroad. He also headed the Giessen local group of the Campaign of the Germans and Austrians in the Reich. The members espoused a Greater German ideology and the concept of annexation. When he, in conjunction with Walter Platzhoff and Karl Brandi, was tasked with reorganizing the General German Historians' Committee, he sought to give greater consideration to the aspirations of "Germans abroad" and their needs.

Although Giessen was a relatively small University, Mayer felt very much at home there. He undertook extensive excursions to explore the Lahntal and the area around Giessen. Nevertheless, he wrote in 1931 that he would leave if a better offer came along.

=== Role during National Socialism (1933–1945) ===
==== Relationship to the NS regime ====
Mayer's wife was a supporter of the National Socialist movement even before her husband. She is said to have voted National Socialist as early as the summer of 1932. His son Theodor Mayer-Edenhäuser was also an admirer of Adolf Hitler and joined the NSDAP in the spring of 1932 and the SA in the fall of the same year.

In the final phase of the Weimar Republic, Mayer supported a right-wing authoritarian turn. However, the DNVP under its chairman Alfred Hugenberg was too "Prussian" for him, and in spring 1931 he criticized the NSDAP's inability to pursue positive politics. "They don't seem to get beyond mass demagoguery", he criticized. In the run-up to the Hessian state elections on 15 November 1931, he attended two NSDAP events in Giessen. In July 1932, he continued to express skepticism about the National Socialists' ability to govern. According to his biographer Reto Heinzel, Mayer developed sympathies for the political ideas of National Socialism in the fall of 1932 at the latest. He was less enthusiastic about the political movement than about the strict, authoritarian government under Adolf Hitler's leadership.

According to Reto Heinzel, Mayer did not change his political stance abruptly in the first months of the National Socialist government, but continuously, and not for career reasons, but out of inner conviction. According to Anne Christine Nagel, he was enthusiastic about the National Socialists after the March 1933 elections; he wrote that it was now "really a pleasure to be German". Among historians, Mayer was considered a convinced National Socialist, at least since he took over the Freiburg Chair of Medieval History in 1934.

In April 1933, at the age of fifty and in a secure position as a professor, he wrote a letter to Wilhelm Bauer in which he made disparaging remarks about the mass entry into the NSDAP of hundreds of thousands of people after the parliamentary elections in March 1933 (the so-called "March Fallen"). He himself applied for admission to the party on 22 May 1937, after the ban had been lifted, and was admitted retroactively to May 1 (membership number 4,352,531). His political reliability was undisputed even without membership in the NSDAP. In August 1933, he joined the National Socialist Teachers League. He was also a member of the National Socialist People's Welfare, the Imperial Air Defense League, and the National Socialist German Lecturers League. In this milieu, Mayer emphasized his common geographical origins with Adolf Hitler. In the eyes of the Nazi rulers, Mayer was ideologically "irreproachable" and politically "fundamentally correct. He was involved in the commemorative publication for Adolf Hitler's 50th birthday, where he published a research report on "Economic and Social History" since 1933. In a "political assessment" in 1941, the regional leadership in Kassel concluded that he had "proved himself to be a convinced National Socialist.

At the end of March 1933, in a letter to his friend Wilhelm Bauer, he called for differentiation in the treatment of the Jewish population, arguing for a distinction between "Eastern Jews and long-established Jews whose families have lived here for 500 years or more". Five years later, this was no longer the case. In a letter to Wilhelm Bauer dated 14 March 1938, Mayer, who was oriented towards Greater Germany, commented on the long-awaited "Annexation of Austria" with a mixture of joy and malice towards the fate of the Jewish teachers at Vienna University. Only an impassive comment on the Kristallnacht of 1938 has survived.

==== Freiburg professorship (1934–1938) ====
In Freiburg im Breisgau, Mayer succeeded Hermann Heimpel on 1 October 1934, in the chair of medieval history held by Georg von Below. Taking over this chair at a much larger university was a noticeable step up for him. The environment was now much more political than in Giessen. As a so-called "borderland University," Freiburg was in close proximity to Switzerland and the hereditary enemy France. Mayer's inaugural lecture in Freiburg on 23 May 1935 dealt with the state of the Zähringers. It was published in the same year. For this lecture, the passionate cyclist cycled along the old Zähringer roads and village foundations in his study area. For him, exploring the landscape was an essential part of the scientific discovery process. In 1936/37 he was vice dean of the Faculty of Philosophy in Freiburg. One of his students there was Martin Wellmer.

At the end of May 1935, the Karlsruhe cultural bureaucracy appointed Mayer chairman of the Baden Historical Commission, which had been dissolved in 1933 and re-established in 1935 according to the Führerprinzip, not only because of his reputation as a scholar but also because of his political reliability. On the occasion of the re-establishment in Karlsruhe, he gave a speech on 4 December 1935, thanking "our Führer Adolf Hitler" and professing his belief in the "National Socialist German conception and view of history" laid down by the Führer. With this speech, he made a clear commitment to National Socialism in the presence of the Gauleiter and Reichsstatthalter.

In 1935, Mayer took over the management of the Western studies from Franz Steinbach. In spring 1935, the National Socialist mayor of Freiburg, Franz Kerber, put him in charge of the Alemannic Institute. The institute was maintained by the city of Freiburg. Mayer, however, wanted to link it closely with the university. He also wanted to collaborate with Swiss and Alsatian scholars. Therefore, against the will of the mayor, the institute was renamed the Upper Rhine Institute for Historical Regional Studies. This led to a rift with Kerber. Tensions also arose with Friedrich Metz, who also rejected the renaming of the institute. Mayer also had personal differences at the Department of History with Gerhard Ritter, who had a Lesser Germany orientation. Mayer only avoided dismissal by accepting an appointment to Marburg in 1938.

==== Teaching and rectorate in Marburg (1938–1942) ====
In 1937, Edmund Ernst Stengel became president of the Monumenta Germaniae Historica, which had been called the Reich Institute for Older German History since its institutional reorganization in 1935. As successor to Stengel's Marburg Chair of Medieval History, Mayer was the preferred candidate of the retiring scholar. In October 1938, he succeeded Stengel at the small-town and Protestant Philipps University of Marburg. The Institute for Historical Regional Studies in Hesse and Nassau was associated with the chair. However, Mayer was by no means enthusiastic about his new academic position. He had no intention of "becoming absorbed in Hessian history". In addition to medieval studies, Mayer also dealt with historical topics of current political relevance. In the summer semester of 1939, he gave a lecture on the history of the Germans in the Alpine and Sudeten countries. The occasion was the break-up of Czechoslovakia and the " annexation of Austria". The fifty-six-year-old enlisted months before 1 September 1939. It was with regret that he accepted his age-related refusal.

After less than a year, Mayer was nominated by a majority of professors as a candidate for the politically exposed position of rector. On 2 November 1939, he was appointed by the Reich Science Minister Bernhard Rust. He held the rectorate from late autumn 1939 until December 1942, making himself available for a position at the height of the National Socialist rise to power, which not only had to organize the academic world, but also fulfil political functions. From 1938 to 1942, he was also head of the Historical Commission for Hesse and Waldeck.

Mayer repeatedly served as a scholarly advisor to the SS's "Ancestral Heritage" and party circles. From 1940 on, he was head of the medieval department of the " Use of the Humanities in War". This was a major project of humanities scholars organized by Kiel's Rector Paul Ritterbusch on behalf of the Reich Ministry of Science, Education, and Cultural Affairs, with the goal of creating a European view of history shaped by German historians. According to Mayer's opinion in 1941, an intellectual leadership of Europe was unthinkable without the fulfillment of this task. There were good contacts with the " ancestral heritage " of the SS. Mayer proposed to the curator of this institution, Walther Wüst, the creation of a "Germanic prosopography" as a research project. The plan was to record some 15,000 individuals from the time of Charlemagne to the year 1200. According to Mayer, the "general Germanic prosopography" was to determine "the extent to which the awareness of the blood-based membership of the European nobility, and thus a common Germanic feeling, lives on, and what role the Germanic peoples played in the development of the European world of nations, states, and culture, not only through their numbers but also through the position of leading personalities. The work was continued during the war.

==== President of the Monumenta Germaniae Historica (1942–1945) ====
In April 1942, Mayer was appointed provisional director of the Reich Institute for Older German History, as the Monumenta Germaniae Historica (MGH) had been known since 1935. On October 1, he became the first Austrian to be appointed president of the institute, a fact he repeatedly emphasized with pride. In return for giving up his chair in Marburg and his rectorship, he was to receive not only the presidency but also a professorship at the University of Berlin from the Ministry, but the Ministry's efforts met with fierce resistance from the Berlin faculty. Acting Dean Hermann Grapow made it clear in a letter to the Reich Minister of Education on 28 September 1942, that "the faculty does not want Dr. Theodor Mayer. Grapow went on to say that he saw Mayer as a threat to harmony in the field of medieval and modern history. Mayer had a "reputation as a restless, domineering, even boorish man. As a result, only an honorary professorship was established for Mayer.

In 1942, Mayer suffered a personal blow: his 29-year-old son died on 29 May 1942 as a result of a double wound he had sustained in the Battle of Kharkov. After the loss of his only son, Mayer's tone of voice intensified. In his speech on 11 July 1942 on the occasion of the university foundation ceremony, he spoke of "total war". The war was "a conflict between two world views, it is a battle for the right to life of individual peoples and their culture, for a better world order with the aim of putting a stop to the disintegration and destruction that threatens us from abroad".

As president, Mayer headed an institution dedicated primarily to the edition of medieval sources. However, Mayer was not interested in editorial work. Rather, he wanted to reorganize the traditional tasks of the MGH under the umbrella of the Reich Institute for the History of the New Germany. In the last years of the total war, he was no longer able to develop lasting creative possibilities at the MGH. In 1944, the MGH was evacuated from Berlin to Schloss Weißenstein near Bamberg due to increasing bombing raids. The suggestion was probably made by Carl Erdmann, who was well acquainted with Count Erwein von Schönborn-Wiesentheid.

=== Post-war period ===
==== Dismissal as MGH President ====
Mayer experienced the end of the war with a few MGH employees in Pommersfelden, Franconia, which was occupied by the Americans on 14 April 1945. In early September 1945, he was arrested by the American military authorities and interned in the Hammelburg camp until June 1946. He was released to Pommersfelden in June 1946. During this time, Mayer's main concern was the future of the MGH. In a letter to the Regierungspräsident (Germany) for Upper and Middle Franconia, he emphasized that "German science" had achieved a "leading position" in the 20th century. In terms of cultural policy, this asset was "of the utmost importance". With the right effort, "the most effective and at the same time least expensive propaganda" could be carried out. In the summer of 1946, Mayer was assured by Walter Goetz that there was no doubt that he would be reinstated as president.

Mayer succeeded in presenting numerous exonerating expert opinions from renowned colleagues. He himself wrote an expert opinion for his loyal student Heinrich Büttner, and Büttner in turn agreed to act as an exonerating witness for Mayer in the proceedings of the Trial Chamber. On 22 September 1947, the Höchstadt an der Aisch Trial Chamber classified Mayer as a "follower" in Level IV and sentenced him to pay 500 Reichsmarks. The court's verdict stated that he had "only nominally participated in National Socialism". Mayer saw the lenient sentence, which was typical of the time, as a "brilliant justification of my strictly objective, scientific attitude during the entire period of National Socialist rule".

At the end of September 1946, the Central Directorate, the scientific advisory board of the Monumenta Germaniae Historica that had existed until 1935, was re-established. At their first meeting, the members of the Central Directorate agreed that in the event of an acquittal, Mayer should be "immediately reinstated" in his position. However, the Central Directorate did not wait for the Appeals Chamber's decision. It decided to elect a new president in December 1947. The Berlin medievalist Friedrich Baethgen became the new president on 1 January 1948. The following years of Mayer's life were not marked by a confrontation with his own past, but by a struggle to make amends for the injustice he felt had been done to him. Mayer argued that he had never been dismissed as a Reich official and was therefore still in office. Unlike other dismissed historians, he wrote two open letters in 1948 to a wider public at home and abroad. In it, he declared himself the rightful president and denied the legitimacy of the election conducted by the central leadership. Mayer was merciless in his reckoning with the people he felt had deceived or betrayed him. He accused Baethgen of his own Nazi involvement and called Walter Goetz a "senile fool. Some of his colleagues who were on his side held back. Mayer's student Heinrich Büttner, for example, did not want to jeopardize his appointment negotiations. Anne Christine Nagel believes that after 1945 Mayer "did not really stumble over his commitment to National Socialism," but rather "was sidelined by his colleagues because of considerable deficits in his personal conduct.

Mayer's financial situation in the early postwar years was poor. It was not only his political burden but also his advanced age that made it difficult for him to return to university teaching. He and his wife lived on the income from their house in Marburg and the contributions of their daughters Hanna, who was a teacher in Salzburg, and Emma. Mayer's wife received a small fee from the publication of short articles in the Schweinfurt newspaper. He now returned to academic work, especially medieval constitutional history. As a result of this work, the Böhlau publishing house in Weimar published "Fürsten and State. Studies in the Constitutional History of the German Middle Ages. In fifteen essays, he commented on ecclesiastical Advocatus, royal protection, immunity and jurisdiction, and the problems of Empire and Territory. In this work, he also presented a differentiation between Imperial and Royal Monasteries, which had long been unquestioned by Constitutional historians.

Only in private conversations and letters did Mayer express his criticism of Konrad Adenauer's domestic and foreign policies, "football nationalism," and the danger of black supremacy over the white race.

==== New fields of activity: Constance Working Group and Collegium Carolinum ====
Mayer's former academic student Otto Feger had been pursuing the plan to found an institute for the history and cultural history of the Lake Constance region in Constance with municipal support since the beginning of 1946. For Feger, Mayer was the only right person to head the institute. On 20 April 1948, the city council passed a charter for the "Municipal Institute for Landscape Studies of the Lake Constance Region". Mayer, who had lived with his wife in Schönborn Castle near Pommersfelden until 1951, moved to Constance. He felt at home there. The comments about his life in Constance are largely positive. Mayer received his full pension in accordance with Article 131 of the Basic Law.

The Municipal Institute for Landscape Studies of the Lake Constance Region was opened on 30 October 1951, with a ceremonial lecture by Heinrich Büttner. The first events lasting several days followed in the fall of 1952. Initially, meetings were held in spring and fall at different locations. From 1957 on, the meetings were held almost exclusively on the Reichenau. The Constance Medieval History Study Group was formally founded in 1960. As chairman, Mayer was able to manage an annual budget of 40,000 to 50,000 DM. This sum covered the travel and lodging expenses of the participants.

In April 1956, Mayer was elected chairman of the Collegium Carolinum. According to Christoph Cornelißen, the projects there differed neither conceptually nor methodologically from those of the years before 1945. The research work was to examine the "share of the Germans in the cultural, social, and legal development of the Bohemian lands. An "overall analysis of the expulsion" was also planned.

==== The last years of life ====
At the age of 85, Mayer retired from Constance and moved to Salzburg, where his two daughters lived. He relinquished the presidency of the Collegium Carolinum only two years before his death. He died in Salzburg on 26 November 1972. To the end of his life, Mayer was unable to come to terms with what he perceived as a humiliating dismissal as president of the MGH. In April 1968, shortly before leaving Constance, he wrote to Walter Schlesinger: "There are moves to merge the Research Group with the MGH. Please prevent this as long as I am alive. When I die, I will be cremated, then I need not and cannot turn over in my grave". Reto Heinzel attests to Mayer's pronounced tendency toward self-righteousness. He practically never expressed self-criticism, but was convinced to the end of his life that he had survived the "Third Reich" morally unscathed.

At the end of his life, Mayer was an honored scholar. From 1927 to 1945 he was a member of the German Society of Science and Art for the Czechoslovak Republic. In 1942, he became a corresponding member of the Austrian Academy of Sciences and the Bavarian Academy of Sciences in Munich. Also in 1942, he received an honorary doctorate from the University of Erlangen. Two years later, Mayer became a member of the Prussian Academy of Sciences. In 1950 he became a member of the Historical Commission of the Sudetenland. From 1954 to 1968, Mayer was a full member of the Commission for Historical Regional Studies in Baden-Württemberg, becoming an honorary member in 1968. On his 70th birthday in 1954 a commemorative publication was published. The community of Neukirchen an der Enknach awarded him the honorary citizenship in 1958. In 1963 he was made an honorary citizen of Reichenau. On his 80th birthday, Mayer was awarded the Grand Cross of the Order of Merit of the Federal Republic of Germany.

== Personality and interaction with colleagues ==
Due to his professional success and with an eye to Adolf Hitler, who was born just a few years after him and also spent his early years in the Innviertel, Mayer referred to the specific assertiveness of the people from his homeland. That is why he liked to call himself an "Innviertler". In the 1950s, the Austrian local historian Eduard Kriechbaum described his long-time friend as a "typical Innviertler" who had a thick head in certain cases and would not put up with anything. Mayer was not very popular among experts. In his personal dealings, he was considered brusque, highly argumentative, and autocratic. After leaving Freiburg for Marburg, Willy Andreas wrote to Friedrich Baethgen in April 1939: "We on the Upper Rhine are all glad to be rid of him." In Marburg, Wilhelm Mommsen had spoken out against him on the appointments committee because of Mayer's pronounced intolerance. The trustee of the University of Marburg, Ernst von Hülsen, said of Mayer: "Professor Mayer is a personality who constantly disturbs the peace and the work of the university through attacks and unjustified interference, as well as through the way he treats people. [...] Rector Mayer suffers from an exaggerated need for recognition and power, and from an unrestrained sense of power".

Joseph Lemberg has taken up and developed Anne Christine Nagel's thesis that Mayer was sidelined after 1945 because of his deficits in personal interaction. According to Lemberg, it was Mayer's social climbing habitus that made it difficult for him to access the networks of the academic community. His German historian colleagues were predominantly from the Protestant, educated middle class; Mayer's angular appearance remained alien to them. Mayer tried to compensate for this by forming political alliances. While Friedrich Baethgen or Albert Brackmann were able to portray their non-membership of the Nazi party as opposition to the system, this narrative pattern was not available to Mayer, a former party member.

== Work ==
Mayer coined the concepts of the early medieval association of individuals, the institutional territorial state, the freedom to clear land, and kingship. His research on the conditions of settlement in Bohemia, which began in the late 1920s, was intended as part of a "folklore science" in the southwestern German "borderland. Mayer was convinced that the Germans had always moved through history as carriers of culture. With his Freiburg inaugural lecture on the Zähringer state and several other works, the focus of his work shifted to constitutional and imperial history, a traditional field of research in medieval studies. Mayer did not publish a large, comprehensive account of this field. The constitutional history of the Middle Ages, which had already been agreed with a publisher, did not materialize. During the Second World War, he made a name for himself primarily with studies on Medieval imperial and Constitutional history. According to Michael Matheus, there are no racial-biological arguments in his publications. As president of the MGH, he earned lasting merit through the timely evacuation of the MGH library to Pommersfelden near Bamberg. During his presidency, he was primarily concerned with the dissemination of a pan-European perspective based on regional history and ethnology. In the post-war period, he made a name for himself as a scientific organizer, above all as the founder of the Constance Working Group.

=== Activity as a science organizer ===
==== Southwest German Science Organization ====
The majority of the funding for the Upper Rhine Institute went towards the implementation of regional history projects. The money was to be used to finance long-term work on an Alemannic atlas and research into the Zähringers in Burgundy. Mayer wanted to achieve the envisaged goal of a "new foundation of Alemannic history" through "comprehensive research in all areas". Mayer's activities for the institute were viewed differently by his colleagues. According to Franz Quarthal, Mayer intended to "give the institute the character of a medieval-oriented University Institute of Regional History". According to Michael Fahlbusch, he played a significant role in the "Gleichschaltung" of the institute.

In 1935, Mayer became head of the Southwest German Research Association. He was responsible for the organization and management of scientific conferences. The entire western border region was treated from a folkloristic point of view. The results of the conferences were not published in book form, but were distributed to the individual conference participants as working papers with the note "strictly confidential". The aim was not to make the results of the meetings known to a wider public or to make them available to international researchers for review.

As chairman of the Baden Historical Commission, Mayer was able to exert considerable influence on publications. For the Journal for the History of the Upper Rhine, he advocated the publication of "works with folkloristic content. As many articles as possible should deal with Switzerland and Alsace. Mayer considered academic life in Alsace "too weak". The German influence on science in the neighboring French region should be maintained. Mayer repeatedly rejected articles for political or anti-Semitic reasons. When he learned that the author of an essay on the Thanner Steinmetz Order was the former Social Democratic Minister of Labor Rudolf Wissell, "the amateurish treatment of the material and the immense breadth seemed clear and understandable" to him. The article was published after Mayer's departure in 1942. Mayer tried to prevent the publication of an essay by Käthe Spiegel on the "peace project of a Fürstenberger". He wrote to the editor, Manfred Krebs, that the essay could not be printed "because Mrs. Spiegel is not Aryan, but 100% Jewish. I know her from Prague.

==== Marburg Rectorate ====
As rector, Mayer wanted above all to emphasize the importance of the University as an integral part of the Nation and State, not only for the end of the war, but also for peacetime. In the fall of 1939, the University of Marburg was affected by the closure of some universities due to the war. Mayer's first efforts focused on reopening the University. In a letter dated 29 November 1939, he asked Gauleiter Karl Weinrich to work with Hermann Göring to reopen the University as soon as possible. Mayer maintained a close and friendly working relationship with Weinrich in the period that followed. His decision to award honorary senatorships to Gauleiter Karl Weinrich and Provincial Governor Wilhelm Traupel was politically motivated. It was intended "to express, on the one hand, the University's close ties to the intellectual life of our people and its unconditional commitment to the goals and tasks of the NSDAP, and, on the other hand, its roots in the cultural life of the state of Hesse. The decision to award the prize was made in the summer of 1940, at a time when the Regime's military successes were winning it increasing acceptance in Academic circles. Weinrich declined the honor, citing a decree from the Party Chancellery, but Mayer was able to enjoy his favor throughout his time as rector.

On 30 January 1940, Mayer gave a speech on Germany and Europe in the auditorium of the University of Marburg on the occasion of the founding of the Reich and the assumption of power. He attempted to place the National Socialists' Lebensraum policy in the East in the tradition of Medieval imperial policy. During this time, he also worked on a "series of lectures on military science," which was intended to "anchor German war aims, instruction and education as well as intellectual stimulation. The target audience was the "common soldier. Above all, the "resistance of the troops" was to be encouraged.

Historical image documents on Theodor Mayer in Marburg
- Hessian State Office for Historical Regional Studies

==== Coordination of the " War effort of the humanities" ====
From 1940 to 1945, Mayer served as the head of the Medieval Department within the DFG-funded "War Effort of the Humanities." In an article he wrote for the Völkischer Beobachter in 1942, Mayer asserted that historians had to address a number of complex issues related to the war, including the struggle for a new Political order, its historical foundation, the forces that supported it and those that fought against it in the past and present, and the destruction of that order. To fulfill this role, he organized a series of conferences at historically significant locations in the German Reich until the end of the war. A total of eight conferences were held: in Berlin in June 1940, in Nuremberg in February 1941, in Weimar in November 1941 and May 1942, in Magdeburg in November 1942, in Erlangen in April 1944, in Pretzsch near Wittenberg in October 1944 and in Braunau am Inn in January 1945. The conference was only canceled in 1943 due to a nationwide ban on conferences. Frank-Rutger Hausmann concludes that this science was contextualized and explicitly served ideological purposes. Some of the results of the conferences were published.

The inaugural conference convened by Mayer in June 1940 was designed to facilitate a discourse on the utilization of German historical scholarship in the intellectual discourse with Western powers. In light of the prevailing war circumstances, the historians were tasked with examining the relationship between England and the European continent. Mayer was particularly enthusiastic about the military achievements of the German Armed Forces in May and June 1940. Consequently, he contemplated expanding the conference's overarching agenda during the inaugural session. In light of the altered war circumstances, the discourse with England was soon supplanted by investigations into the role of the Reich in Europe. The "Kriegseinsatz" conference in Nuremberg in February 1941 addressed the subject of "Reich and Europe." That same year, the conference proceedings edited by Mayer and Walter Platzhoff were published under the title "The Reich and Europe." In the foreword, Mayer and Platzhoff asserted that their objective was to contribute to the ongoing debate, which they defined as "not only a military and political one, but just as much an intellectual one." The assembled historians were aware of their duty to provide historical tools for the central problem of the present war and the forthcoming reorganization of Europe. They were also tasked with viewing and interpreting the development of the past from the standpoint of the present. The idea of the Reich's role as the "European organizing power" was widespread among historians in these years and became one of the "guiding concepts of historical interpretation." Mayer gave lectures at the German Scientific Institute in Bucharest in 1942. The central argument was that "the historical necessity of integrating Romania into a European order led by Germany" was a key point.

In the fall of 1941, a series of discussions on the topic of "Questions of German kingship, the high nobility and the peasantry and their significance for the formation of the state from various perspectives" took place in Weimar. These discussions resulted in the publication of the volume Nobility and peasants in the German state of the Middle Ages, edited by Mayer. In January 1945, Mayer extended an invitation to a scientific discussion on fundamental questions of an all-Bavarian view of history to be held in Braunau am Inn. In his invitation, he avoided the term "conference" in order to avoid contravening the Reich Minister for Science, Education and National Education Bernhard Rust's directive of 14 April 1942, which permitted only "local events and conferences" to be held, provided that they were deemed "so important to the war" that they could not be postponed. The event in Braunau am Inn, the birthplace of Adolf Hitler, was probably the last conference held as part of the "Joint venture". Mayer's efforts were well received by the Nazi regime, and he was awarded the War Merit Cross for his work as part of the "war effort of the humanities".

==== Work as President of the Reich Institute and Director of the German Historical Institute in Rome ====
Mayer not only took over the management of the Imperial Institute, but also the editorship of the German Archive for Research into the Middle Ages, the most important historical journal for the study of the Middle Ages. As president, he wanted to integrate the MGH more strongly into historical research beyond its source-related tasks and transform it into a far-reaching institute for the history of the Middle Ages. In the two and a half years until the end of the war, he was hardly able to realize any of these plans. A provisional edition of the charters of the Hohenstaufen rulers Frederick I and Henry VI and a new edition of volume IX of the Scriptores series were planned as new editorial projects.

As President of the Reichsinstitut in Personal Union, Mayer was also Director of the German Historical Institute in Rome. In this capacity, he was responsible for the academic staff remaining in Rome and had to ensure the future of the valuable library. In 1942, he initiated a research project with the aim of "researching imperial rule in Italy, especially the imperial estate." In a memorandum dated 1 April 1944 (piano Mayer), Mayer considered the removal of all the holdings of the central Italian archives to be unfeasible. He also expressed his disapproval of the transfer of individual archival records to Germany. Instead, he demanded that important archives be photographed. According to Jürgen Klöckler, Mayer thus prevented a far-reaching theft of archives, namely the large-scale transportation of deeds, documents, and files relating to Germany to the Reich. Thanks to this decision, he was able to institutionally anchor young historians in Rome in an expanded art protection department of the military administration, thus sparing them conscription into the German Armed Forces.

Mayer relocated the extensive Berlin library holdings from Berlin to Bavaria in January 1944, fearing air raids. This measure was carried out without prior approval from the ministry. The two employees, Margarete Kühn and Ursula Brumm, and some of the furniture remained in Berlin. Kühn states that Mayer remained resolutely National Socialist to the end and attempted to influence his employees accordingly.

==== Mayer's plans for a German Historical Institute in Paris ====
In a memorandum dated 10 February 1941, Mayer proposed the founding of a German Historical Institute in Paris in response to the military successes of the German Armed Forces in France. He argued that German historical scholarship had the task of assuming a "leading role in the European area corresponding to its political position" and of "shaping or at least decisively helping to shape the European view of history." Mayer understood a "European" view of history to mean a "Germanic history of Europe," a view of the history of Europe "in the Germanic sense." This project was "only possible through the most rigorous academic work on the broadest basis and with the best forces and methods, but also with the clearest objectives."

He pursued this idea for approximately two years. In March 1942, Mayer proposed Büttner as the academic director of a new German historical institute to be established in Paris. In April 1942, he presented reflections on the present and future of historical scholarship in the Völkischer Beobachter. The "present tasks" of German historical scholarship included addressing the "questions of the present war, with the struggle for a European order, with its historical substructure." Additionally, historical scholarship was tasked with "helping build the future of the people" and presenting the "leading position of the German people" in a "history of the Germanic-German world since the earliest times." The community of European peoples and states was to plan in the sense of a "pan-Germanic conception of history." As an institutional basis, research centers outside the German Reich were to be created. Once again, Mayer proposed a historical institute in Paris. The course of the war necessitated the repeated revision of his institute plan. Ultimately, even a position for a historian could not be filled. This was due to the scarcity of financial resources as the war progressed and disputes over responsibilities between the ministries involved. In November 1957, Mayer asserted to Eugen Ewig, a prominent figure in the establishment of the Centre Allemand de Recherche Historique, that he was the intellectual originator of the institution. However, Mayer's concepts did not serve as a model during the period of Franco-German rapprochement and therefore remained unmentioned in the discussions and correspondence.

==== The Constance working group and the development of a "crisis-proof view of History" ====
Mayer made several statements in the 1950s on the question of a new image of History. Stefan Weinfurter notes that the call for a "new image of history [...] runs like a red thread through Theodor Mayer's written and oral statements. In a 1952 memorandum on the founding of the Constance Institute, Mayer called for history to be "lifted out of the discord of contemporary political life" and for "the foundations of a crisis-proof history" to be laid. He had observed "with horror" "how German history was rewritten with every political change. In 1955, Mayer declared that the most important task of the "Municipal Institute for Landscape History of the Lake Constance Region" in Constance, which was founded under his leadership, was "to develop a new picture of the past of the German people and the German Reich that is crisis-proof and does not have to be rewritten with every change of political mood. This goal was to be achieved through the "promotion of scientific regional research in Germany, especially in the Lake Constance region. As he explained in 1953, historical regional research should form the basis for this, since it is "particularly capable of building bridges because it does not start from state-oriented concepts. This approach made it possible to "demonstrate forces that we cannot really imagine on the basis of normal written sources. In 1961, Mayer wanted "an image of history [...] that is not endangered, that does not have to be turned upside down again and again with the next political or other change [...]". However, he did not back up his general considerations with a research program. Bernd Weisbrod sees this project as an example of the "rhetorical strategies of self-denazification in the mindset of Mandarinism". Peter Moraw sees it as a "form of self-deception". For Reto Heinzel, Mayer was an unteachable man who remained "in search of a new Middle Ages on the basis of popular culture.

The conferences of the 1950s dealt with questions of constitutional history. Historians who enjoyed the personal esteem of the organizer Mayer were invited. Besides Mayer, the founding members included the medievalists Karl Bosl, Walter Schlesinger, Helmut Beumann, Heinrich Büttner, Eugen Ewig, Otto Feger, and Franz Steinbach, as well as the Munich Byzantinist Hans-Georg Beck. Among the speakers were friends and colleagues such as Hektor Ammann, Heinrich Dannenbauer, Eugen Ewig, Wilhelm Ebel, Ernst Klebel, Walther Mitzka, Walter Schlesinger, Helmut Beumann, Heinrich Büttner, Karl Siegfried Bader, Otto Brunner, and Joachim Werner. According to Nagel, the working group was a "receptacle for politically charged individuals. The interdisciplinary approach to the conference topic by historians, archaeologists and philologists was typical of the Constance working group. For Mayer, it was not only the joint work that was of central importance for scientific progress, but also the personal relationships. Mayer repeatedly emphasized that the Constance Circle was not only a working group, but also a "circle of friends". Bosl, Büttner, Ewig, Schlesinger and Steinbach were all professors at renowned universities and at the same time provided a link to young academics. Many of the young lecturers later became professors themselves, so that the working group soon gained a corresponding reputation in medieval studies.

There was a continuity of personnel from the " wartime " conferences to the Reichenau conferences. The medievalists Walter Schlesinger and Karl Bosl also played a leading role in the Constance Working Group on Medieval History. Traute Endemann has pointed out that the personal environment and conceptual origins of the early Constance working group date back to the early 1930s. Frank-Rutger Hausmann emphasizes that the academic collaboration with the Constance Working Group continued after the war.

=== Research work ===
==== The beginnings of Economic History and the turn towards National Science ====
Mayer's early work in the 1920s dealt with problems of administrative and economic history. His dissertation focused on economic history. His work focused on trade on the Danube, "on which the main trade of Austria took place". He published other important studies on the Passau toll books (1908) and on the Vienna staple right. One of the most important works of his Prague period is the German Economic History, published in 1928, which was highly acclaimed both nationally and internationally. Marc Bloch described it as a "modèle de clarté et de bon sens" ("model of clarity and insight"). Its significance lies in the fact that it considers not only classical problems of Economic History, but also questions of Social and Cultural History, such as urbanism and colonization in the Middle Ages, the significance of religion for the emergence of early capitalism, or the emergence of the "social question". Mayer was the first German-speaking historian to deal extensively with the concept of Capitalism. At the same time, he liberated the term from its exclusive use in economics and sociology and made it available for discussion in the field of history.

Mayer was probably confronted with the problems of Sudeten Germanism due to his wife's Bohemian origins. After the collapse of the Danube Monarchy and the establishment of Czechoslovakia, many Germans saw themselves as a minority and felt they were engaged in an existential "Volkstum" for the continued existence of the German settlement in the Sudetenland. Between 1926 and 1929, Mayer took part in six conferences of the Leipzig Foundation for German Folk and Cultural Soil Research. The conference held in Nysa in October 1926 was dedicated to the topic of Silesia. Mayer gave a lecture on the history of industry in the Sudetenland. This conference was interdisciplinary in nature. Many of the contributions were based on the assumption that the Sudeten-Silesian territories were united "in terms of ethnicity". The emphasis on Germanic elements in settlement, culture and language played a central role. Even after the end of the Leipzig Foundation, Mayer continued to campaign for financial support for Sudeten German cultural institutions.

An essay by Mayer published in 1928 is characterized by the Sudeten German " national struggle". In it he tried to emphasize the "great achievements" of German immigrants since the Middle Ages. He neglected Czech development. He repeatedly dealt with the history of the Sudetenland, but during his seven years in Prague he did not learn Czech or study Czech literature. The few Czech authors whose works he did notice were cited in translations prepared for him by Josef Pfitzner, then an assistant at the History Department. His work was based primarily on the findings of German scholars, most of whom cooperated with the Leipzig Foundation. For Mayer, there was no doubt that German achievements were far superior to those of the Czechs. He described the Germans as a capable and creative people, the Czechs as passive and less innovative. Mayer argued for German superiority not only in the development of law, but also in the field of new technical achievements, citing the "German plow" as an example. He saw the urban system as a "cultural achievement" of the Germans, while admitting that the Slavic settlements had very limited opportunities for development. The entire cultural and economic development of Bohemia was due to the Germans.

In Freiburg, Mayer emphasized the "German achievements" for Alsace and the entire Upper Rhine region, especially in relation to France. He assumed that a "uniform ethnicity" lived everywhere in the Upper Rhine region. In doing so, he continued the work of Friedrich Metz. Metz had described the entire Upper Rhine Valley as a "Cultural and Economic unit" in 1920. In the first issue of the central organ of German folklorists, the German Archive for Regional and Ethnological Research, Mayer stated that Alsace, as a "German inland region," was "one of the most culturally flourishing landscapes in Germany. Its "annexation" to France had brought its "own cultural development to a standstill.

==== Modern German constitutional history ====
Along with Otto Brunner, Adolf Waas and Walter Schlesinger, Theodor Mayer was one of the most important representatives of the so-called "modern German Constitutional History". This term refers to the approaches that emerged in the 1930s and 1940s, which, according to the participants, were different from the older constitutional history. They criticized the prevailing doctrine, which was too firmly rooted in liberal constitutional ideas and saw medieval statehood as a separation of state and society. The previous concepts were replaced by "empire and people," "leaders and followers," "aristocratic rule," and the Germanic character of the Middle Ages. However, Mayer never presented an overall picture, but only published essays and individual studies.

Mayer first formulated his thesis on the transformation of the early medieval "personal association state" into the early modern "institutional territorial state" in his Giessen Lecture of January 1933 in the auditorium of the Hessian State University, and elaborated on it in his Freiburg Inaugural Lecture. He was concerned not only with the example of the Zähringers, but with the "emergence of the medieval state" in general. Mayer began by focusing on aspects of the territory "in which the Zähringers developed their historical activities. The Zähringers established a territory early on through the clearing activities of the abbeys of St. George, St. Peter, and St. Blaise, which they governed, and through towns such as Freiburg and Villingen, which they founded on important roads. Mayer praised the "new state" of the Zähringers as a significant achievement. However, it had neglected "the basis of the personal association state, the community of persons, the national basis of the state. It had thus become ossified in "routine as a princely end in itself. Mayer therefore did not assume a progressive development, but drew a contrast between the "personal association state", the "state based solely or almost solely on the community of persons, which cannot exist without a great leader", and the "institutional territorial state", for which there is always the danger "that it will ossify in bureaucratic administrative routine into an authoritarian state, which is an end in itself".

Mayer's thoughts were shaped by the political hopes of the time. In the final passage, he praised the Third Reich as a synthesis of the old Germanic state of loyalty, the national community, and the institutional territorial state: "State and people have become one." Personal loyalty, allegiance, and the idea of national identity had become "supporting elements of the state and the German national community and have given the state and the people the moral foundation and responsibility without which they cannot exist in the long run. According to Mayer, the Germanic state is characterized by "a community of people held together by personal ties, especially loyalty. "The personal association state corresponds to a structure and distribution of state rights and functions in the sense of loyalty and fief. Mayer placed loyalty, allegiance, and fealty in a powerful context, identifying them as elements of the Germanic state. The Nazi newspaper Volksgemeinschaft praised Mayer's explanations in a review: "With reference to our time, it is very instructive that here a modern state essentially expands its sphere of power by reclaiming new land, by reclamation and settlement."

==== Clearance and royal freedom ====
The term "free peasants" was originally coined by Karl Weller, who propounded the theory of the Hohenstaufen free peasants. According to this theory, the free peasants of the High Middle Ages in southwestern Germany were not common freemen, but new settlers established by the Hohenstaufen rulers. Mayer introduced the concept of "freedom to clear land" into his research and placed his observations in a larger context. The conquest of land and the establishment of the Frankish empire appear in a new light. The conquest of Gaul by the Merovingian kings was not carried out by free warrior-farmers, but by unfree soldiers, who acquired freedom only through military service and settlement on royal land. Freedom was therefore not inherited, but granted by the kingship for military service, clearing and settlement. Together with Heinrich Dannenbauer, Mayer developed the doctrine of royal freemen. In 1955 he stated: "[...] we came to the conclusion that the so-called common freemen of the Carolingian period were royal freemen who were obliged to perform military service and to pay taxes, and who were endowed with land by the king and thus often became new settlers". Freedom in the Middle Ages was therefore derived from the king or acquired through land clearing. The doctrine of royal liberty was considered of great importance for the state structure of the Frankish period. It "laid the foundations for a new overall picture of the early medieval state.

==== Research controversy with the Swiss historian Karl Meyer ====
A research dispute arose between Theodor Mayer and the Swiss historian Karl Meyer over the founding of the Swiss Confederation. As a Swiss patriot, Karl Meyer was an advocate of "spiritual national defense". He repeatedly dealt with the formation of the Swiss Confederation. He considered the founding of Switzerland to be "a unique and exceptional case in the history of the Middle Ages and the Western peasantry". In 1941, on the occasion of the 650th anniversary of the founding of the Swiss Confederation, he published a comprehensive account of this topic.

Theodor Mayer was clearly critical of Meyer's theses. He believed that Switzerland had neither the geographical nor the ethnic prerequisites for a unified state. Furthermore, it did not represent a unity either in terms of language or denomination. Theodor Mayer criticized the Swiss historian's view as being "teleological", i.e. always focused on the later territory. He countered this view with his approach of a "modern" regional history, which did not choose a Bavarian or Baden history as its subject, but rather "German history in a specific area, the formation of territorial states within a larger area, for example the formation of territorial states in south-eastern Germany, south-western or north-western Germany, on the Upper Main or Upper Rhine". By assuming "spaces", Theodor Mayer assigned a larger "space" to German history as a whole. For him, Swiss history was German history, and the emergence of the Swiss Confederation was a German problem because "Switzerland was part of the German Empire in the 13th century". According to Peter Stadler, Karl Meyer saw Mayer's criticism in the German Archive as "the academic prelude to a planned incorporation of Switzerland. In 1943, he published a "clarification" entitled On the Swiss Will to Freedom. In this controversy, however, Theodor Mayer received broad support, for example from Hermann Rennefahrt, Albert Brackmann, Hans Fehr, and Hektor Ammann. Mayer's student Marcel Beck, on the other hand, was critical. He argued that Theodor Mayer's approach was "just as teleological as that of Swiss research: namely with regard to the history of the German Empire, which was consolidated only very late and which, as a romantic idea, moved people's minds for centuries.

== Reception in posterity ==
=== Scientific repercussions ===
The so-called newer German constitutional history was further developed by Karl Bosl, Walter Schlesinger, and Helmut Beumann. It remained the leading direction of medieval research until at least the 1970s. In 1986, František Graus emphasized the temporal nature of the so-called "new constitutional history". The findings of this approach have been revised in recent decades as the mechanisms of the practice of rule and political interaction, such as the representation of rule, rituals, and conflict resolution, have increasingly come into focus. Gerd Althoff identifies three findings that contributed significantly to a new view of high medieval kingship. These findings concern social ties, the so-called "rules of the game" of conflict management and conflict resolution, and the importance of consultation. It has been demonstrated that social ties of a kinship and friendly-cooperative nature among the greats were not subservient to their obligations towards the king. In contrast to previous research, the king was no longer regarded as occupying a unique position within the ruling family. Theodor Mayer's concept of a personal association state based on loyalty and a sense of allegiance to a leader is therefore considered to be obsolete. Upon examination of conflicts within the ruling association, it becomes evident that non-written norms and the institution of mediators served as a counterweight to royal power. Mediators were not constrained by royal instructions in the resolution of conflicts.

The findings on the importance of personal ties underlying the doctrine of the personal association state have been expanded in more recent research, for example in the studies by Verena Epp on "amicitia" or by Gerd Althoff on "group ties" between "relatives, friends, and faithful". However, an adequate description of statehood in the High Middle Ages in a European context remains a research gap. One of the problems with Mayer's formula of the "personal association state" today seems to be the determination of the concrete starting point of its development. It is also questionable whether one can really speak of a temporal succession of two fundamentally different states. Mayer's dictum was criticized by Andreas Rutz in a study published in 2018. Instead, Rutz speaks of a "duality of personal and territorial rule" familiar to both the Middle Ages and the early modern period. A radical change from one form of rule to the other could not be observed.

The doctrine of the freedom to clear land and the freedom of the kings became established in constitutional and social history research, dominated for a long time, and also found its way into regional history research. In a study published in 1974, Hans K. Schulze was particularly critical of the freedom to clear land. He pointed out that the assumption of a special form of legal freedom acquired through clearing, settling, military or royal service was not supported by the sources. According to Schulze's findings, both free and unfree people were involved in the clearing. Clearing and settlement activities did not change the personal legal status of those involved. They merely offered the prospect of economic benefits and better property rights. According to Wilfried Hartmann, the error of the older research lies in the fact that far-reaching constitutional-historical conclusions were derived from isolated details in a sparse tradition of sources.

In the second half of the 20th century, Mayer's approach to the constitutional history of the Zähringers, taking into account the findings of regional history, provided the subsequent historians Hans-Walter Klewitz and Heinrich Büttner with a number of ideas. From the 1960s onwards, Berent Schwineköper, Walter Heinemeyer and Hagen Keller gave new impetus to Zähringer research. In particular, the major Zähringer exhibition in 1986 changed the understanding of the ducal dynasty through new questions.

=== Discussion about Mayer's role in National Socialism ===
In commemorative publications and obituaries for Theodor Mayer, problematic aspects of his work under National Socialism were ignored or glossed over. In a tribute to Theodor Mayer on the occasion of his 85th birthday, Josef Fleckenstein praised two volumes produced as part of the so-called "war effort" as "testimony to clean and rigorous scholarship", as "an astonishing achievement in the midst of the turmoil of war". The volumes were proof "that the publisher had succeeded in keeping himself and his scholarship free of all party propaganda. German historians have been very slow to address the role of some prominent historians during the Nazi era. Only a few historians addressed Mayer's Nazi past until the 1980s. However, East German historian Gottfried Koch stated in 1962 that Mayer, like other historians during World War II, wrote articles with the aim of "pseudo-historically underpinning Hitler's plans for aggression.

The critical examination of Mayer's past began in 1991 on the occasion of the fortieth anniversary of the Constance Working Group. Johannes Fried, the first chairman at the time, addressed the brown past of the association and its founder for the first time in his speech. Fried explained that Mayer had avoided the pressing questions, "both about the political failure of historical scholarship in the Third Reich, which he himself had represented in a prominent position, and about the culpability of institutionalized research in general. The fact that historical scholarship has been slow to come to terms with the role of leading historians in the Nazi era sparked heated debates at the 1998 Frankfurt Historians' Conference. The section "German Historians under National Socialism" received the most attention in a discussion on 10 September 1998, led by Otto Gerhard Oexle and Winfried Schulze. The discussion of this topic subsequently led to a large number of publications. On the occasion of the fiftieth anniversary of the German Historical Institute in Paris, a colloquium examined the origins of the Institute from a personal historical perspective. It focused on the biographies of the Institute's founders and their relationship to National Socialism. Theodor Mayer was included in the circle of "founding fathers". In November 2019, the Monumenta Germaniae Historica and the German Historical Institute in Rome will organize the symposium The Reich Institute for Older German History 1935 to 1945 - a "war contribution of the humanities"? In the papers published in 2021, Anne Christine Nagel ("Alone among colleagues" - Theodor Mayer and the MGH during the war) and Folker Reichert ("Master and servant - Theodor Mayer and Carl Erdmann"), among others, examined various aspects of Theodor Mayer.

A clear distinction between Mayer's scientific and propagandistic publications remained dominant in more recent research. A monograph on Theodor Mayer was a research gap for a long time. This gap was filled in 2016 by Reto Heinzel's report. Heinzel analyzed holdings in 33 archives and, above all, Mayer's own papers and those of his correspondents. The aim of his work is to examine "the work and actions of Theodor Mayer [...] in their entirety" in order to "break through the usual separation between the scientist and the politically minded [...]". Heinzel was able to prove with numerous examples that Mayer regularly and deliberately crossed the boundary between science and political propaganda.

== Publications (selection) ==
A list of his writings, which only includes publications up to 1959, was published in: Theodor Mayer: Mittelalterliche Studien. Collected essays. Thorbecke, Lindau 1959, pp. 505-507 (2nd, unchanged reprint. Thorbecke, Sigmaringen 1972).

Collection of essays

- Theodor Mayer: Medieval studies. Collected essays. Thorbecke, Lindau 1959.

Monographs

- Fürsten und Staat. Studien zur Verfassungsgeschichte des deutschen Mittelalters. Böhlau, Weimar 1950.
- Der Staat der Herzoge von Zähringen (= Freiburger Universitätsreden. Vol. 20). Wagner, Freiburg im Breisgau 1935. Reprinted with abridgements in: Ders: Mittelalterliche Studien. Gesammelte Aufsätze. Thorbecke, Sigmaringen 1959, pp. 350–364.
- Deutsche Wirtschaftsgeschichte der Neuzeit (= Wissenschaft und Bildung. Vol. 249). Quelle & Meyer, Leipzig 1928.
- Deutsche Wirtschaftsgeschichte des Mittelalters (= Wissenschaft und Bildung. Vol. 248). Quelle & Meyer, Leipzig 1928.
- Die Verwaltungsorganisationen Maximilians I. Ihr Ursprung und ihre Bedeutung. Wagner, Innsbruck 1920.
- Der auswärtige Handel des Herzogtums Österreich im Mittelalter (= Forschungen zur inneren Geschichte Österreichs. Vol. 6). Wagner, Innsbruck 1909.

Editorships

- Der Vertrag von Verdun 843. 9 Aufsätze zur Begründung der europäischen Völker- und Staatenwelt. Koehler & Amelang, Leipzig 1943.
- Adel und Bauern im deutschen Staat des Mittelalters. (= Das Reich und Europa. Vol. 6). Koehler & Amelang, Leipzig 1943.

== Sources ==
- Anne Christine Nagel, Ulrich Sieg (Edited): Die Philipps-Universität Marburg im Nationalsozialismus. Dokumente zu ihrer Geschichte (= Pallas Athene. Vol. 1 = Academia Marburgensis. Vol. 7). Steiner, Stuttgart 2000, ISBN 978-3-515-07653-1, pp. 373–452.

== Bibliography ==
- Reto Heinzel: Theodor Mayer. Ein Mittelalterhistoriker im Banne des "Volkstums" 1920–1960. Schöningh, Paderborn 2016, ISBN 3-506-78264-9.
- Reto Heinzel: Theodor Mayer. In: Michael Fahlbusch, Ingo Haar, Alexander Pinwinkler (Ed.): Handbuch der völkischen Wissenschaften. Akteure, Netzwerke, Forschungsprogramme. In collaboration with David Hamann. 2nd completely revised and expanded edition. Vol. 1, De Gruyter Oldenbourg, Berlin 2017, ISBN 978-3-11-042989-3, pp. 485-488.
- Helmut Maurer: Theodor Mayer (1883–1972). Sein Wirken vornehmlich während der Zeit des Nationalsozialismus. In: Karel Hruza (Ed.): Österreichische Historiker 1900–1945. Lebensläufe und Karrieren in Österreich, Deutschland und der Tschechoslowakei in wissenschaftsgeschichtlichen Portraits. Böhlau, Vienna et al. 2008, ISBN 978-3-205-77813-4, pp. 493–530.
- Anne Christine Nagel: Im Schatten des Dritten Reichs. Mittelalterforschung in der Bundesrepublik Deutschland 1945–1970 (= Formen der Erinnerung. Vol. 24). Vandenhoeck & Ruprecht, Göttingen 2005, ISBN 3-525-35583-1, pp. 156–187 (Digital copy).
