= Feudalism =

Legal and military structure in medieval Europe

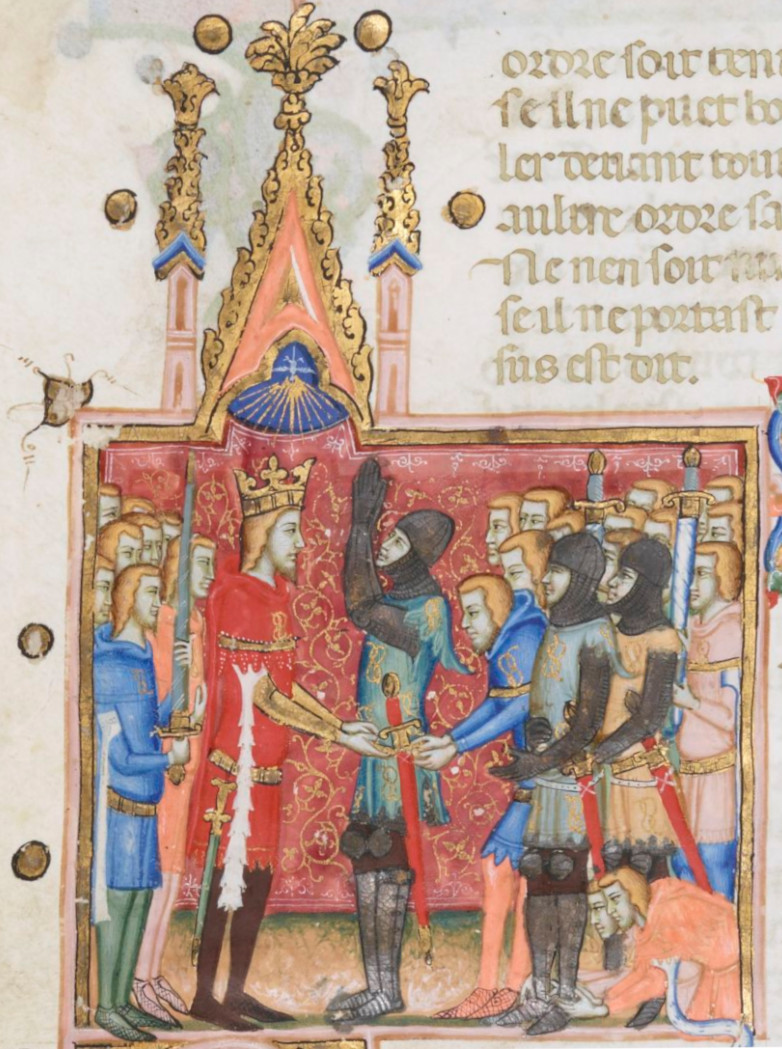
Investiture of a knight (miniature from the statutes of the Order of the Knot, founded in 1352 by Louis I of Naples)

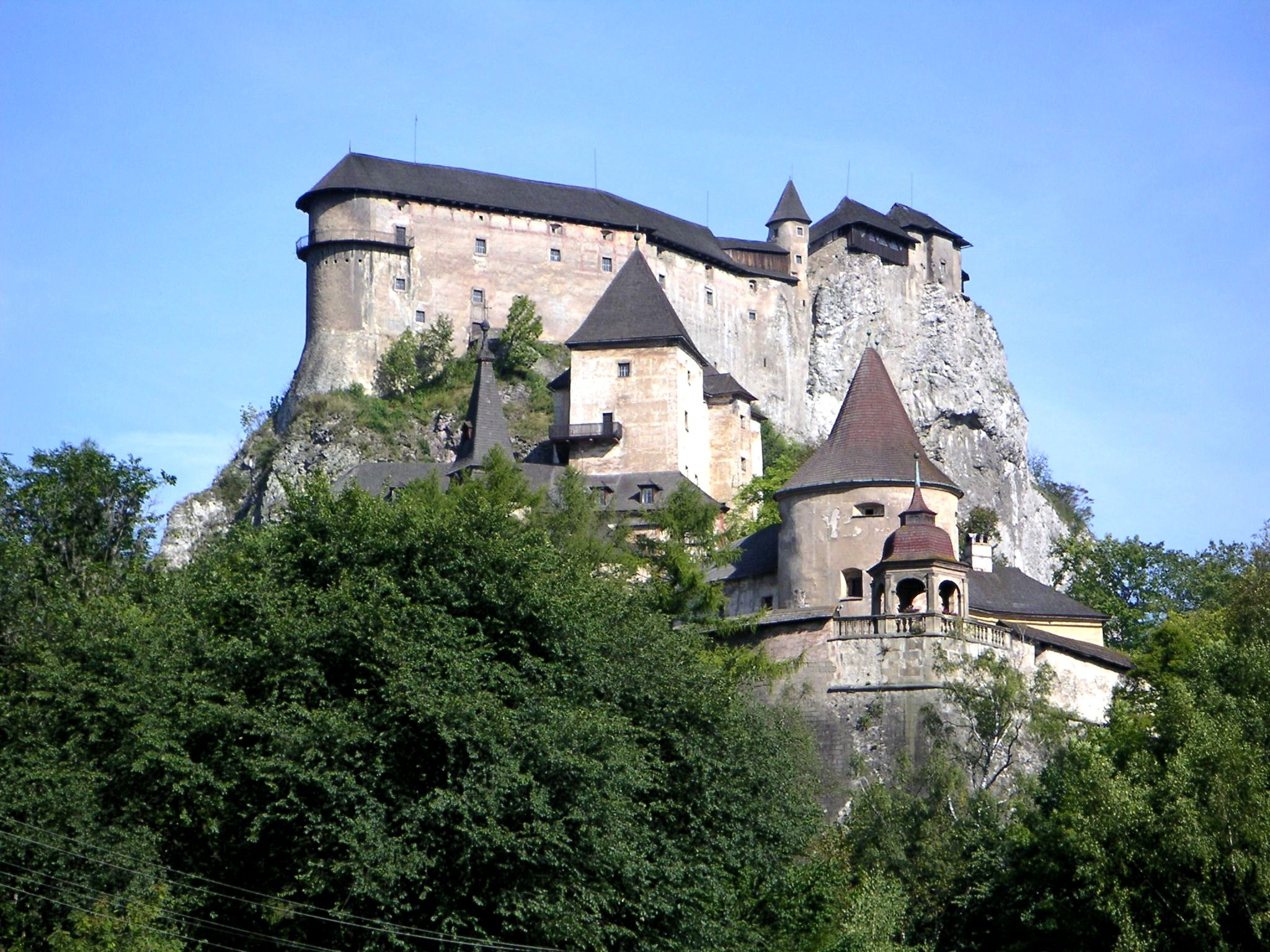
Orava Castle in Slovakia. Medieval castles are a traditional symbol of a feudal society.

Feudalism, also known as the feudal system, was a combination of various customs and systems that flourished in medieval Europe from the 9th to 15th centuries. Broadly defined, it was a way of structuring society around relationships derived from the holding of land in exchange for service or labour.

The classic definition, by François Louis Ganshof (1944), describes a set of reciprocal legal and military obligations of the warrior nobility and revolved around the key concepts of lords, vassals, and fiefs. A broader definition, as described by Marc Bloch (1939), includes not only the obligations of the warrior nobility but the obligations of all three estates of the realm: the nobility, the clergy, and the peasantry, all of whom were bound by a system of manorialism; this is sometimes referred to as a "feudal society".

Although it is derived from the Latin word feodum or feudum (fief), which was used during the medieval period, the term feudalism and the system it describes were not conceived of as a formal political system by the people who lived during the Middle Ages. Since the publication of Elizabeth A. R. Brown's "The Tyranny of a Construct" (1974) and Susan Reynolds's Fiefs and Vassals (1994), there has been ongoing inconclusive discussion among medieval historians as to whether feudalism is a useful construct for understanding medieval society.

Some scholars have also applied the label outside of Europe, including feudal Japan, medieval Ethiopia, Spring and Autumn period China, ancient Egypt, the Parthian Empire, India until the Mughal dynasty, the Antebellum South and Jim Crow laws in the American South, and premodern Mongolia and Central Asia.

== Definition ==
The adjective feudal was in use by at least 1406, and the noun feudalism was in use by the end of the 18th century, paralleling the French féodalité.

According to a classic definition by Belgian medievalist François Louis Ganshof, feudalism describes a set of reciprocal legal and military obligations of the warrior nobility that revolved around the key concepts of lords, vassals and fiefs, though Ganshof himself noted that his treatment was only related to the "narrow, technical, legal sense of the word."

A broader definition, as described in Marc Bloch's 1939 Feudal Society, includes not only the obligations of the warrior nobility but the obligations of all three estates of the realm: the nobility, the clergy, and those who lived off their labour, most directly the peasantry, which was bound by a system of manorialism. This order is often referred to as a feudal society, echoing Bloch's usage.

Outside its European context, the concept of feudalism can be extended to analogous social structures in other regions, most often in discussions of feudal Japan under the shoguns, and sometimes in discussions of medieval Ethiopia, which had some feudal characteristics (sometimes called "semifeudal"). Some have taken the feudalism analogy further, seeing feudalism (or traces of it) in places as diverse as Spring and Autumn period China, ancient Egypt, the Parthian Empire, and India until the Mughal dynasty.

The term feudalism has also been applied—often pejoratively—to non-Western societies where institutions and attitudes similar to those in medieval Europe are perceived to prevail. Some historians and political theorists believe that the term feudalism has been deprived of specific meaning by the many ways it has been used, leading them to reject it as a useful concept for understanding society.

The applicability of the term feudalism has also been questioned in the context of some Central and Eastern European countries, such as Poland and Lithuania, with scholars observing that the medieval political and economic structure of those countries bears some, but not all, resemblances to the Western European societies commonly described as feudal.

== Etymology ==
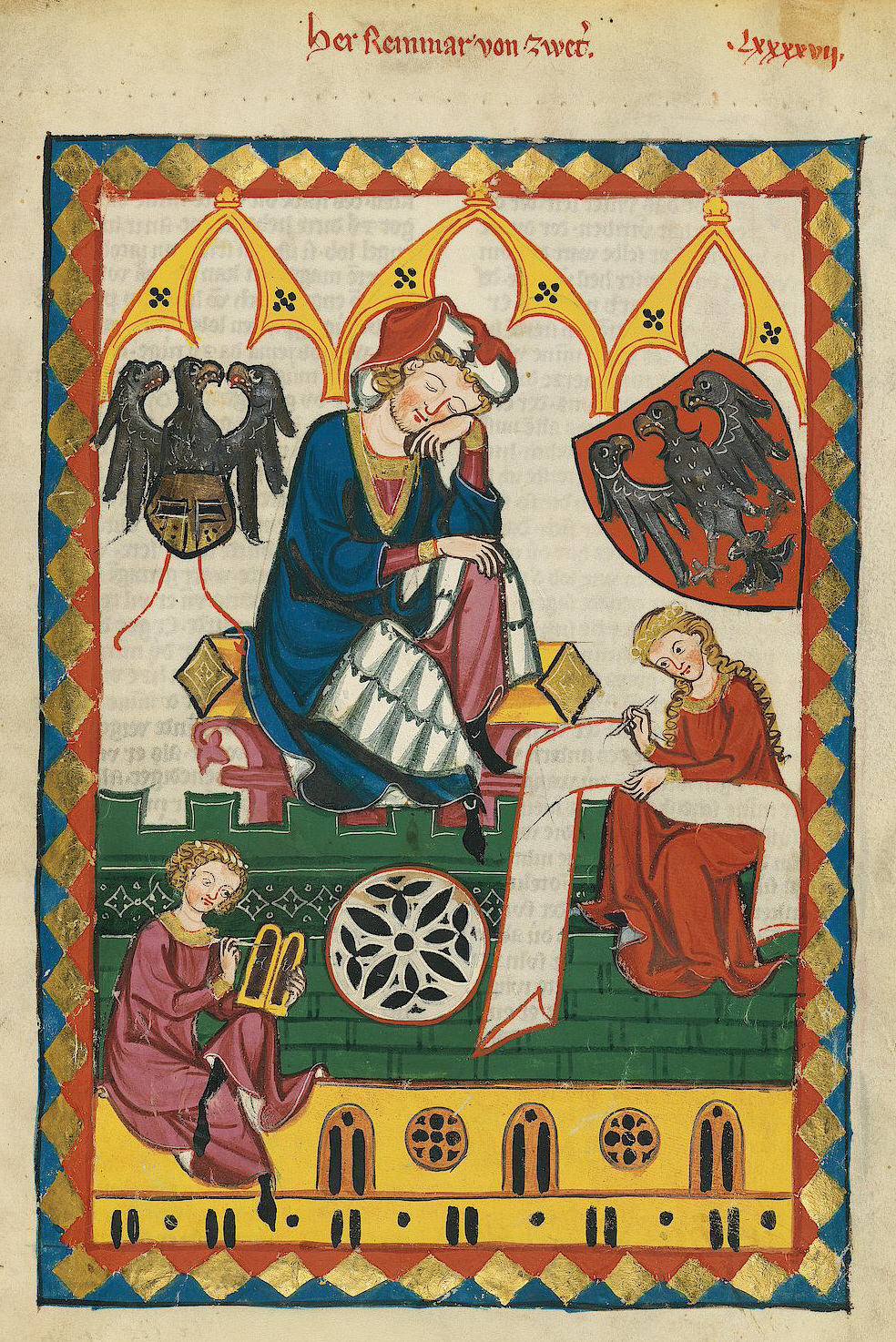
Herr Reinmar von Zweter, a 13th-century Minnesinger, was depicted with his noble arms in Codex Manesse.

The word feudal comes from the medieval Latin feudālis, the adjectival form of feudum 'fee, feud', first attested in a charter of Charles the Fat in 884, which is related to Old French fé, fié, Provençal feo, feu, fieu, and Italian fio. The ultimate origin of feudālis is unclear. It may come from a Germanic word, perhaps fehu or fehôd, but these words are not attested with this meaning in Germanic sources, or even in the Latin of the Frankish laws.

One theory about the origin of fehu was proposed by Johan Hendrik Caspar Kern in 1870, being supported by, amongst others, William Stubbs and Marc Bloch. Kern derived the word from a putative Frankish term *fehu-ôd, in which *fehu means 'cattle' and -ôd means 'goods', implying "a movable object of value". Bloch explains that by the beginning of the 10th century it was common to value land in monetary terms but to pay for it with objects of equivalent value, such as arms, clothing, horses or food. This was known as feos, a term that came to mean paying for something in place of money. This meaning was later applied to land, where land was used as payment for fealty, such as to a vassal. Thus, the old word feos, meaning "movable property," eventually shifted to feus, meaning the exact opposite: "landed property."

Archibald Ross Lewis proposes that the origin of fief is not feudum (or feodum), but rather foderum, the earliest attested use being in Vita Hludovici (840) by Astronomus. In that text is a passage about Louis the Pious that says annona militaris quas vulgo foderum vocant, which can be translated as "Louis forbade that military provender (which they popularly call "fodder") be furnished."

Initially in medieval Latin European documents, a land grant in exchange for service was called a beneficium (Latin). Later, the term feudum, or feodum, began to replace beneficium in the documents. The first attested instance of this is from 984, although more primitive forms were seen up to one-hundred years earlier. The origin of the feudum and why it replaced beneficium has not been well established, but there are multiple theories, described below.

The term "féodal" was first used in 17th-century French legal treatises (1614) and translated into English legal treatises as an adjective, such as "feodal government".

In the 18th century, Adam Smith, seeking to describe economic systems, effectively coined the forms "feudal government" and "feudal system" in his book The Wealth of Nations (1776). The phrase "feudal system" appeared in 1736, in Baronia Anglica, published nine years after the death of its author Thomas Madox, in 1727. In 1771, in his book The History of Manchester, John Whitaker first introduced the word "feudalism" and the notion of the feudal pyramid.

Another theory by Alauddin Samarrai suggests an Arabic origin, from fuyū (the plural of fay, which literally means 'the returned', and was used especially for 'land that has been conquered from enemies that did not fight'). Samarrai's theory is that early forms of 'fief' include feo, feu, feuz, feuum and others, the plurality of forms strongly suggesting origins from a loanword. The first use of these terms is in Languedoc, one of the least Germanic areas of Europe and bordering Al-Andalus (Muslim Spain). Further, the earliest use of feuum (as a replacement for beneficium) can be dated to 899, the same year a Muslim base at Fraxinetum (La Garde-Freinet) in Provence was established. It is possible, Samarrai says, that French scribes, writing in Latin, attempted to transliterate the Arabic word fuyū (the plural of fay), which was used by the Muslim invaders and occupiers at the time, resulting in a plurality of forms – feo, feu, feuz, feuum and others—from which eventually feudum derived. Samarrai, however, also advises to handle this theory with care, as Medieval and Early Modern Muslim scribes often used etymologically "fanciful roots" to support outlandish claims that something was of Arabian or Muslim origin.

== History ==
Feudalism, in its various forms, usually emerged as a result of the decentralization of an empire: such as in the Carolingian Empire in the 9th century AD, which lacked the bureaucratic infrastructure necessary to support cavalry without allocating land to these mounted troops. Mounted soldiers began to secure a system of hereditary rule over their allocated land and their power over the territory came to encompass the social, political, judicial, and economic spheres.

These acquired powers significantly diminished unitary power in these empires. However, once the infrastructure to maintain unitary power was re-established—as with the European monarchies—feudalism began to yield to this new power structure and eventually disappeared.

=== Classic feudalism ===
The classic François Louis Ganshof version of feudalism describes a set of reciprocal legal and military obligations of the warrior nobility based on the key concepts of lords, vassals, and fiefs. In broad terms a lord was a noble who held land, a vassal was a person granted possession of the land by the lord, and the land was known as a fief. In exchange for the use of the fief and protection by the lord, the vassal provided some sort of service to the lord. There were many varieties of feudal land tenure, consisting of military and non-military service. The obligations and corresponding rights between lord and vassal concerning the fief form the basis of the feudal relationship.

=== Vassalage ===
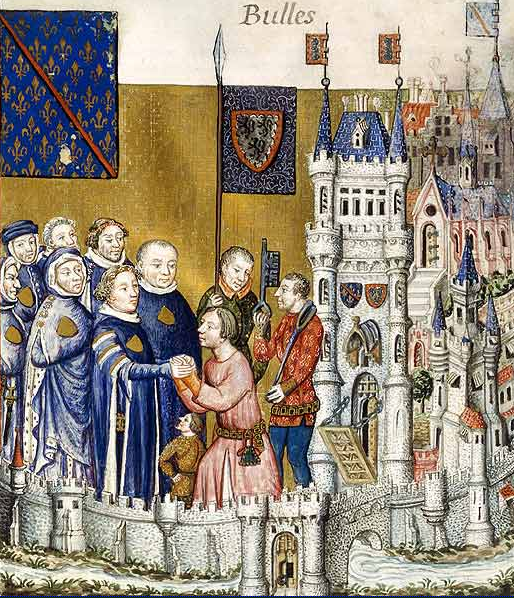
Homage of Clermont-en-Beauvaisis

Before a lord could grant land (a fief) to someone, he had to make that person a vassal. This was done at a commendation ceremony comprising an act of homage and an oath of fealty. During homage, the lord and vassal entered into a contract in which the vassal promised to fight for the lord at his command, whilst the lord agreed to protect the vassal from external forces. Fealty comes from the Latin fidelitas and denotes the fidelity owed by a vassal to his feudal lord. "Fealty" also refers to an oath that more explicitly reinforces the commitments of the vassal made during homage; such an oath follows homage.

Once the commendation ceremony was complete, the lord and vassal were in a feudal relationship with agreed obligations to one another. The vassal's principal obligation to the lord was to provide aid or military service. Using whatever equipment the vassal could obtain by virtue of the revenues from the fief, the vassal had to answer calls to military service by the lord. This security of military help was the primary reason the lord entered into the feudal relationship. In addition, the vassal could have other obligations to his lord, such as attendance at his court, whether manorial, baronial, both termed court baron, or at the king's court.

France in the late 15th century: a mosaic of feudal territories

It could also involve the vassal providing "counsel", so that if the lord faced a major decision he would summon all his vassals and hold a council. At the level of the manor this might be a fairly mundane matter of agricultural policy, but also included sentencing by the lord for criminal offences, including capital punishment in some cases. Concerning the king's feudal court, such deliberation could include the question of declaring war. These are examples of feudalism; depending on the period of time and location in Europe, feudal customs and practices varied.

=== The feudal revolution in France ===
In its origin, the feudal grant of land had been seen in terms of a personal bond between lord and vassal, but with time and the transformation of fiefs into hereditary holdings, the nature of the system came to be seen as a form of "politics of land" (an expression used by the historian Marc Bloch). The 11th century in France saw what has been called by historians a "feudal revolution" or "mutation" and a "fragmentation of powers" (Bloch) that was unlike the development of feudalism in England or Italy or in Germany in the same period or later: Counties and duchies began to break down into smaller holdings as castellans and lesser seigneurs took control of local lands, and (as comital families had done before them) lesser lords usurped/privatized a wide range of prerogatives and rights of the state, including travel dues, market dues, fees for using woodlands, obligations, use the lord's mill and, most importantly, the highly profitable rights of justice, etc. (what Georges Duby called collectively the "seigneurie banale"). Power in this period became more personal.

This "fragmentation of powers" was not, however, systematic throughout France, and in certain counties (such as Flanders, Normandy, Anjou, Toulouse), counts were able to maintain control of their lands into the 12th century or later. Thus, in some regions (like Normandy and Flanders), the vassal/feudal system was an effective tool for ducal and comital control, linking vassals to their lords; but in other regions, the system led to significant confusion, all the more so as vassals could and frequently did pledge themselves to two or more lords. In response to this, the idea of a "liege lord" was developed (where the obligations to one lord are regarded as superior) in the 12th century.

=== End of European feudalism (1500–1850s) ===
Around this time, rich, "middle-class" commoners chafed at the authority and powers held by feudal lords, overlords, and nobles, and preferred the idea of autocratic rule where a king and one royal court held almost all the power. Feudal nobles regardless of ethnicity generally thought of themselves as arbiters of a politically free system, so this often puzzled them before the fall of most feudal laws.

Most of the military aspects of feudalism effectively ended by about 1500. This was partly since the military shifted from armies consisting of the nobility to professional fighters thus reducing the nobility's claim on power, but also because the Black Death reduced the nobility's hold over the lower classes. Vestiges of the feudal system hung on in France until the French Revolution of the 1790s. Even when the original feudal relationships had disappeared, there were many institutional remnants of feudalism left in place. Historian Georges Lefebvre explains how at an early stage of the French Revolution, on just one night of 4 August 1789, France abolished the long-lasting remnants of the feudal order. It announced, "The National Assembly abolishes the feudal system entirely." Lefebvre explains:

Without debate the Assembly enthusiastically adopted equality of taxation and redemption of all manorial rights except for those involving personal servitude—which were to be abolished without indemnification. Other proposals followed with the same success: the equality of legal punishment, admission of all to public office, abolition of venality in office, conversion of the tithe into payments subject to redemption, freedom of worship, prohibition of plural holding of benefices ... Privileges of provinces and towns were offered as a last sacrifice.

Originally the peasants were supposed to pay for the release of seigneurial dues; these dues affected more than a quarter of the farmland in France and provided most of the income of the large landowners. The majority refused to pay and in 1793 the obligation was cancelled. Thus the peasants got their land free, and also no longer paid the tithe to the church.

In the Kingdom of France, following the French Revolution, feudalism was abolished with a decree of 11 August 1789 by the Constituent Assembly, a provision that was later extended to various parts of Italian kingdom following the invasion by French troops. In the Kingdom of Naples, Joachim Murat abolished feudalism with the law of 2 August 1806, then implemented with a law of 1 September 1806 and a royal decree of 3 December 1808. In the Kingdom of Sicily the abolishing law was issued by the Sicilian Parliament on 10 August 1812. In Piedmont feudalism ceased by virtue of the edicts of 7 March, and 19 July 1797 issued by Charles Emmanuel IV, although in the Kingdom of Sardinia, specifically on the island of Sardinia, feudalism was abolished only with an edict of 5 August 1848.

In the Kingdom of Lombardy–Venetia, feudalism was abolished with the law of 5 December 1861 n.º 342 were all feudal bonds abolished. The system lingered on in parts of Central and Eastern Europe as late as the 1850s. Slavery in Romania was abolished in 1856. Russia finally abolished serfdom in 1861.

More recently in Scotland, on 28 November 2004, the Abolition of Feudal Tenure etc. (Scotland) Act 2000 entered into full force putting an end to what was left of the Scottish feudal system. The last feudal regime, that of the island of Sark, was abolished in December 2008, when the first democratic elections were held for the election of a local parliament and the appointment of a government. The "revolution" is a consequence of the juridical intervention of the European Parliament, which declared the local constitutional system as contrary to human rights, and, following a series of legal battles, imposed parliamentary democracy.

== Feudal society ==
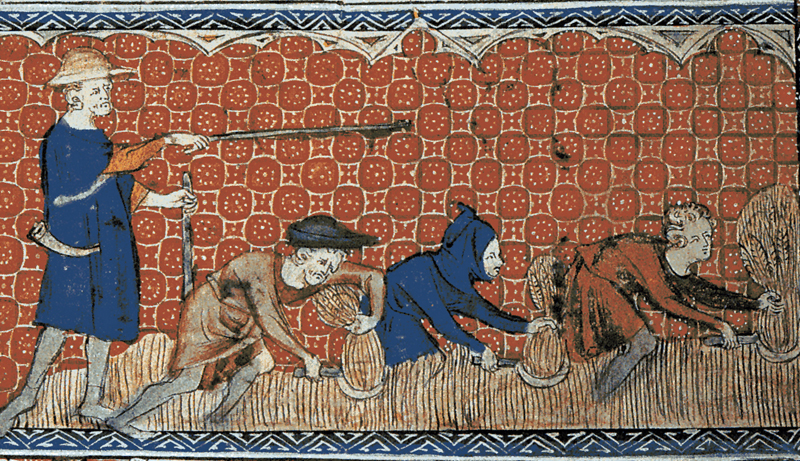
Depiction of socage on the royal demesne in feudal England, c. 1310

The phrase "feudal society" as defined by Marc Bloch offers a wider definition than Ganshof's and includes within the feudal structure not only the warrior aristocracy bound by vassalage, but also the peasantry bound by manorialism, and the estates of the Church. Thus the feudal order embraces society from top to bottom, though the "powerful and well-differentiated social group of the urban classes" came to occupy a distinct position to some extent outside the classic feudal hierarchy.

== Historiography ==
The idea of feudalism was unknown and the system it describes was not conceived of as a formal political system by the people living in the medieval period. This section describes the history of the idea of feudalism, how the concept originated among scholars and thinkers, how it changed over time, and modern debates about its use.

=== Evolution of the concept ===
The concept of a feudal state or period, in the sense of either a regime or a period dominated by lords who possess financial or social power and prestige, became widely held in the middle of the 18th century, as a result of works such as Montesquieu's De L'Esprit des Lois (1748; published in English as The Spirit of Law), and Henri de Boulainvilliers's Histoire des anciens Parlements de France (1737; published in English as An Historical Account of the Ancient Parliaments of France or States-General of the Kingdom, 1739). In the 18th century, writers of the Enlightenment wrote about feudalism to denigrate the antiquated system of the Ancien Régime, or French monarchy. This was the Age of Enlightenment, when writers valued reason and the Middle Ages were viewed as the "Dark Ages". Enlightenment authors generally mocked and ridiculed anything from the "Dark Ages" including feudalism, projecting its negative characteristics on the current French monarchy as a means of political gain. For them "feudalism" meant seigneurial privileges and prerogatives. When the French Constituent Assembly abolished the "feudal regime" in August 1789, this is what was meant.

Adam Smith used the term "feudal system" to describe a social and economic system defined by inherited social ranks, each of which possessed inherent social and economic privileges and obligations. In such a system, wealth derived from agriculture, which was arranged not according to market forces but on the basis of customary labour services owed by serfs to landowning nobles.

=== Heinrich Brunner ===
The Frankish domains in the time of Charles Martel (boundaries approximate), primarily modern day France, Germany, Belgium, Netherlands, Czech Republic and Austria

Heinrich Brunner, in his The Equestrian Service and the Beginnings of the Feudal System (1887), maintained that Charles Martel laid the foundation for feudalism during the 8th century. Brunner believed Martel to be a brilliant warrior who secularized church lands for the purpose of providing precarias (or leases) for his followers, in return for their military service. Martel's military ambitions were becoming more expensive as it changed into a cavalry force, thus the need to maintain his followers through the despoiling of church lands.

Responding to Brunner's thesis, Paul Fouracre theorizes that the church itself held power over the land with its own precarias. The most commonly utilized precarias was the gifting of land to the church, done for various spiritual and legal purposes. Although Charles Martel did indeed utilize precaria for his own purposes, and even drove some of the bishops out of the church and placed his own laymen in their seats, Fouracre discounts Martel's role in creating political change, that it was simply a military move in order to have control in the region by hording land through tenancies, and expelling the bishops who he did not agree with, but it did not specifically create feudalism.

=== Karl Marx ===
Karl Marx also uses the term in the 19th century in his analysis of society's economic and political development, describing feudalism (or more usually feudal society or the feudal mode of production) as the order coming before capitalism. For Marx, what defined feudalism was the power of the ruling class (the aristocracy) in their control of arable land, leading to a class society based upon the exploitation of the peasants who farm these lands, typically under serfdom and principally by means of labour, produce and money rents. He deemed feudalism a 'democracy of unfreedom', juxtaposing the oppression of feudal subjects with a holistic integration of political and economic life of the sort lacking under industrial capitalism.

He also took it as a paradigm for understanding the power-relationships between capitalists and wage-labourers in his own time: "in pre-capitalist systems it was obvious that most people did not control their own destiny—under feudalism, for instance, serfs had to work for their lords. Capitalism seems different because people are in theory free to work for themselves or for others as they choose. Yet most workers have as little control over their lives as feudal serfs." Some later Marxist theorists (e.g. Eric Wolf) have applied this label to include non-European societies, grouping feudalism together with imperial China and the Inca Empire, in the pre-Columbian era, as 'tributary' societies.

=== Later studies ===
In the late 19th and early 20th centuries, J. Horace Round and Frederic William Maitland, both historians of medieval Britain, arrived at different conclusions about the character of Anglo-Saxon English society before the Norman Conquest in 1066. Round argued that the Normans had brought feudalism with them to England, while Maitland contended that its fundamentals were already in place in Britain before 1066. The debate continues today, but a consensus viewpoint is that England before the Conquest had commendation (which embodied some of the personal elements in feudalism) while William the Conqueror introduced a modified and stricter northern French feudalism to England incorporating (1086) oaths of loyalty to the king by all who held by feudal tenure, even the vassals of his principal vassals (holding by feudal tenure meant that vassals must provide the quota of knights required by the king or a money payment in substitution).

In the 20th century, two outstanding historians offered still more widely differing perspectives. The French historian Marc Bloch, arguably the most influential 20th-century medieval historian, approached feudalism not so much from a legal and military point of view but from a sociological one, presenting in Feudal Society (1939; English 1961) a feudal order not limited solely to the nobility. It is his radical notion that peasants were part of the feudal relationship that sets Bloch apart from his peers: while the vassal performed military service in exchange for the fief, the peasant performed physical labour in return for protection – both are a form of feudal relationship. According to Bloch, other elements of society can be seen in feudal terms; all the aspects of life were centred on "lordship", and so we can speak usefully of a feudal church structure, a feudal courtly (and anti-courtly) literature, and a feudal economy.

In contradistinction to Bloch, the Belgian historian François Louis Ganshof defined feudalism from a narrow legal and military perspective, arguing that feudal relationships existed only within the medieval nobility itself. Ganshof articulated this concept in Qu'est-ce que la féodalité? ("What is feudalism?", 1944; translated in English as Feudalism). His classic definition of feudalism is widely accepted today among medieval scholars, though questioned both by those who view the concept in wider terms and by those who find insufficient uniformity in noble exchanges to support such a model.

Although Georges Duby was never formally a student in the circle of scholars around Marc Bloch and Lucien Febvre, that came to be known as the Annales school, Duby was an exponent of the Annaliste tradition. In a published version of his 1952 doctoral thesis entitled La société aux XIe et XIIe siècles dans la région mâconnaise (Society in the 11th and 12th centuries in the Mâconnais region), and working from the extensive documentary sources surviving from the Burgundian monastery of Cluny, as well as the dioceses of Mâcon and Dijon, Duby excavated the complex social and economic relationships among the individuals and institutions of the Mâconnais region and charted a profound shift in the social structures of medieval society around the year 1000. He argued that in early 11th century, governing institutions—particularly comital courts established under the Carolingian monarchy—that had represented public justice and order in Burgundy during the 9th and 10th centuries receded and gave way to a new feudal order wherein independent aristocratic knights wielded power over peasant communities through strong-arm tactics and threats of violence.

In 1939, the Austrian historian Theodor Mayer subordinated the feudal state as secondary to his concept of a Personenverbandsstaat (personal interdependency state), understanding it in contrast to the territorial state. This form of statehood, identified with the Holy Roman Empire, is described as the most complete form of medieval rule, completing conventional feudal structure of lordship and vassalage with the personal association among the nobility. But the applicability of this concept to cases outside of the Holy Roman Empire has been questioned, as by Susan Reynolds.

=== Challenges to the feudal model ===
In 1974, the American historian Elizabeth A. R. Brown rejected the label feudalism as an anachronism that imparts a false sense of uniformity to the concept. Having noted the current use of many, often contradictory, definitions of feudalism, she argued that the word is only a construct with no basis in medieval reality, an invention of modern historians read back "tyrannically" into the historical record. Supporters of Brown have suggested that the term should be expunged from history textbooks and lectures on medieval history entirely. In Fiefs and Vassals: The Medieval Evidence Reinterpreted (1994), Susan Reynolds expanded upon Brown's original thesis. Although some contemporaries questioned Reynolds's methodology, other historians have supported it and her argument. Reynolds argues:

Too many models of feudalism used for comparisons, even by Marxists, are still either constructed on the 16th-century basis or incorporate what, in a Marxist view, must surely be superficial or irrelevant features from it. Even when one restricts oneself to Europe and to feudalism in its narrow sense it is extremely doubtful whether feudo-vassalic institutions formed a coherent bundle of institutions or concepts that were structurally separate from other institutions and concepts of the time.

The term feudal has also been applied to non-Western societies, in which institutions and attitudes similar to those of medieval Europe are perceived to have prevailed (see Examples of feudalism). Japan has been extensively studied in this regard. Karl Friday notes that in the 21st century historians of Japan rarely invoke feudalism; instead of looking at similarities, specialists attempting comparative analysis concentrate on fundamental differences. Ultimately, critics say, the many ways the term feudalism has been used have deprived it of specific meaning, leading some historians and political theorists to reject it as a useful concept for understanding society.

Historian Richard Abels notes that "Western civilization and world civilization textbooks now shy away from the term 'feudalism'."

== See also ==
=== General ===
- Barons in Scotland
- Bastard feudalism
- Cestui que
- English feudal barony
- Feudal baron
- Feudal duties
- List of feudal wars 12th–14th century
- Investiture
- Lehnsmann
- Majorat
- Neo-feudalism
- Nulle terre sans seigneur
- Protofeudalism
- Quia Emptores
- Statutes of Mortmain
- Suzerainty
- Vassal state
- Ziamet

=== Non-European ===
- Fengjian (Chinese)
- Feudalism in Pakistan
- Feudal Japan
- Hacienda
- Indian feudalism
- Mandala (political model)
- Sakdina, a Thai feudal system
- Samanta, an Indian feudal system
- Zemene Mesafint
