= Nomadic feudalism =

- Field: Historical materialism
- Origin: 1934
- Key people: Boris Vladimirtsov; Sh. Natsagdorj

Nomadic feudalism is a theoratical notion based on historical materialism in Marxist historiography. The theory was first proposed by Soviet scholar Boris Vladimirtsov. Prominent advocates of this theory include Mongolian historian Sh. Natsagdorj. Livestock was the main factor of production in nomadic pastoral societies, rather than land. Hence, rich or aristocratic cattle owners giving livestock to poor nomads for pasture (saun) was the ground of feudal relationships. Nomads herded their animals in pasture lands in Mongolia and Central Asia.

== Thesis ==
Writing in 1934, Vladimirtsov characterized Mongolian society as exhibiting a form of "nomadic feudalism." In his view, nomadism was not itself a distinct societal type but could coexist with a feudal structure comparable to European feudalism. He held that feudal relations had already taken shape under the Mongol Empire and persisted beyond the Qing dynasty's collapse in 1912. Although his conclusions are often attributed to Soviet Marxist ideology, they in fact grew out of his own pre-revolutionary scholarship and the broader currents of Russian Mongolian studies at the time. However, this theory has drawn strong criticism from scholars.
