= Territorial state =

State with sovereignty based on land or territory

The term territorial state is used to refer to a state, typical of the High Middle Ages, since around 1000 AD, and "other large-scale complex organizations that attained size, stability, capacity, efficiency, and territorial reach not seen since antiquity." The term territorial state is also understood as “coercion-wielding organizations that are distinct from households and kinship groups and exercise clear priority in some respects over all other organizations within substantial territories.” Organizations such as city-states, empires, and theocracies, along with a number of other governmental organizations, are considered territorial states; however, tribes, lineages, firms, and churches are not.

Unlike the old lordships organised as a personal union, the sovereignty of a territorial state was based on its land or territory and not on membership of a dynastic family or other personally-related rights. Juridical sovereignty is not necessarily required as the main characteristic of statehood. The modern understanding of sovereignty, which was introduced in the 16th century, did not exist until the 19th century and so did not yet apply. Rather, a territorial state reflects the exclusive use of physical force within some type of geographic territory.

The territorial state shares many characteristics with the institutional, geographically defined state typical of the modern era.

== Predecessors of the territorial state ==
The first sign of state existence dates back to 6000 BC. Written and pictorial records from a settlement called Jericho maintain the existence of heavy urbanization for over two thousand years but throughout their history, states have only encompassed a small portion of the earth. Cities emerged around the same time period between 8000 and 7600 BC and eventually merged with states to create city-states that ruled for a few thousand years. City-states were often centered with a capitol controlled by a priest that collected offerings from the surrounding lands. By 2500 BC, some cities began developing into empires that ruled by force and tribute and from then on, the existence of states and cities were central to the great civilizations. The formation of towns and cities allowed for the creation of small independent states, which led to the emergence of large territorial states.

=== Ancient Egypt ===
Originally, Ancient Egypt was ruled through a strong central government in which Egyptian kings, or Pharaohs had complete say over political, economical or military matters. The transition to the adaption of territorial states can be seen during the reigns of the Egyptian Middle Kingdom (2040–1640 BC), and the Egyptian New Kingdom (1550–1070 BC). Due to natural causes, the Old Kingdom fell and gave way to the Middle Kingdom where several merchants began to gain power and deviate from the pharaoh's power. This deviation introduced a form of territorial state due to the introduction of independent rules and power from that of their nation. During the reign of the New Kingdom, diplomatic relations were established with the Hyksos and Hitites, where they each had sovereign communities within their nations that acted as territorial states.

=== India ===
After the collapse of the Harappan Civilization in 1700 BC, India underwent a transition from complete territorial rule to sovereign territorial states. During this time, Indo-Aryans and the Vedic peoples made way into the territory of India and made a set of religious texts known as the Vedas, hence the time period known as the Vedic Age (1700–600 BC). With Hinduism also on the rise, it gave way to independent states where each had to maintain peace and order with other neighbouring independent states. Unlike most independent states, there were differences in power among those residing in India. This however did not last due to the Mauryan Empire preventing sovereign states from acquiring power. The Mauryan Empire lasted from 272 BC to 231 BC in which the death of the last ruler Asoka allowed the next empire (the Mughal Empire) to re-establish new sovereign states.

=== Inca ===
The Inca Empire (1430 to 1530 AD) had developed to become a territorial state. It is estimated that the rule was imposed through an administrative system of 8 to 12 million people. Territories were divided into 80 provinces that were ruled by the Inca government and that was divided by rulers. The formation of the provinces ever under the rule of small political groups. Borders were watch to oversee who would enter and leave. Inca rulers would have people live in open settled areas for the land to be used, worked and watched. Much of the agriculture formation of land was terracing. Many laborers would work on new agricultural land. Rulers were in control of all agricultural work as well as other man labor work such as llama herding, and pottery.

=== Tarascan State ===
The Tarascan state (1300 to 1530 AD) was contemporary with and an enemy of the Aztec Empire against which it fought many wars. The Tarascan empire blocked Aztec expansion to the northwest, and the Tarascans fortified and patrolled their frontiers with the Aztecs, possibly developing the first truly territorial state of Mesoamerica.

== Rise of the territorial state ==
There are a few accepted theories on the emergence of territorial states and they both concern money and war with each stressing one over the other. The mainstream view of territorial state formation emerged around the 12th century as a consequence of the transfer of royal sovereign rights for a particular region to a feudal lord. This meant that within territories unrestrained feudal jurisdiction gave way to a larger central authority that maintained a more stable territory through bureaucracy, a skilled and qualified army, and taxation. This is unlike the medieval hierarchical structure of control and jurisdiction that was in a state of perpetual uncertainty threatened by a shift in the balance of power. The idea of sovereignty emerged from a struggle of power between authoritative institutions like "emperors and popes, popes and kings, and kings and emperors." The idea of a "collective" of nations that maintained a "rule of law" that offered a more stable security from the abuses typical of the medieval hierarchical authority and power structure. Within ancient rulers it was important that their state/empire foundation was constant with ethnic diversity, growth of population, economic and ecological diversity and an organized bureaucracy.

=== Coercion ===
It has been debated amongst scholars that a main motivating factor in territorial state formation was the control and exploitation of the territorial resources by force, which was the main source of revenue for the state. It was important to maintain control over the areas resources because failure to do so resulted in a loss in revenue, which weakened the states authority. People will always recognise the authority of the political unit that offers protection and security. It is widely considered that the only states to have emerged were the ones that could compete in war with other territorial states that resulted in states forming large military forces with technological and tactical advantages. Designated the military revolution, in Europe between 1500 and 1700 occurred a high frequency of wars that got bigger and lasted longer. This allowed for "changes in the art of war" in which better tactics evolved, the size of the army grew substantially allowing for the considerable growth of armed states. This model of the territorial state maintains that war and state formation are independent of economic development occurring only as a consequence of war.

=== Capital ===
The other competing theory maintains that there is a definite stronger link between commerce and territorial state formation. The spirit of "exploration and commerce" that began as maritime routes and destination points on a map eventually gave way to the idea of a bound world as a place of outlined territories. In the 15th century the creation of global sea passages that connected the world together in a true world economy of trade and transportation. Economies on almost every continent that once were separated became connected in a global maritime trading system where risk was distributed more evenly and demand and supply networks became larger as a result which encouraged economic cooperation. The growing global market economy, state populations, and economic ambitions encouraged the intensification of the use of land by territorial states to increase agricultural production for commercial markets. The economic and legal systems present in the territorial state indicated some form of government regulation and cooperative use of territorial land and water. Territorial jurisdiction consists of deciding patterns of land-use including the behavior of the people living within territorial lands. Territorial states became fixed to local and expanding global markets for the economic capital that they produced.

These growing global market economies also allowed for many "prosperous urban centers" to be able to counter any opposing threats from neighbouring rulers. Without any urban or commercial growth being found in a particular area, the chances of a large territorial rule happening increases. This can be seen with such nations like France or England in which monarchs forcibly took control of these territories. As seen later on, the increase in prosperous cities correlated with the increase in consumer demand. This insatiable demand led to more global exportation and importation among transnational city states.

=== Unification ===
Another quality that territorial states required was a form of unification under a common executive. Even in the territories that had separate branches of power or semi-independent political units, it is necessary that these branches or political units adhered to a single executive entity. For Example, all of the counties that were part of the Bavarian branch of the House of Wittelsbach fell under a single territorial state. Even though these counties were partially independent, they still fell under a common executive, which was the Bavarian branch of the Wittelsbach family. The Palatinate branch of the House of Wittelsbach was a different territorial state, because even though the executive of this state stems from the same family, the Treaty of Pavia separated the two branches, resulting in two separate territorial states. Through the recognition of a shared executive, the separate smaller political units are able to qualify as part of a single territorial state. Feudal territories also should not be treated as part of a territorial state, unless they are integrated into a larger political unit that falls under the rule of a common executive.

Scholars state that it is important to analyze the power dynamics of the separate units that fall under a common executive to decide whether or not they form part of the territorial state. For instance, in situations where monarch divides their territory between their heirs, and these new executives develop separate political units, the territories no longer can be considered a single territorial state. In other instances where the larger common executive does not have economic or militaristic control over the smaller semi-independent political unit, then the smaller political unit cannot be considered part of the territorial state.

=== Cartography ===
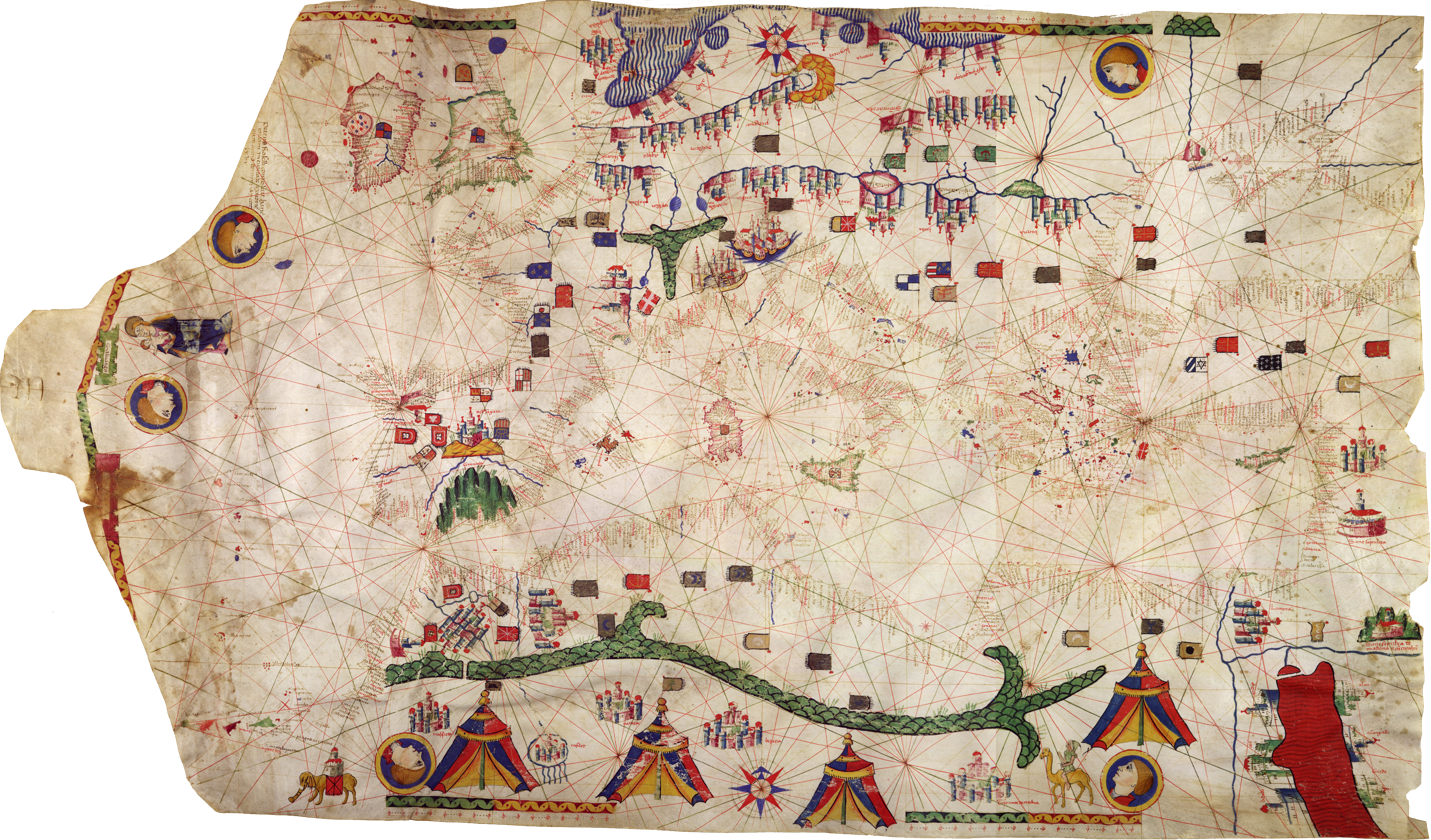
Portolan Chart of the Mediterranean circa 1466

Although it is not the mainstream view, the development of cartography alongside territorial expansion can also be linked to the development of the territorial state. Cartography was a very important use of keep in order how owned land, land survey was also used by the state and landlords to keep track of land mostly for control. Indeed, it is a unit bound by lines on charts and maps. The practice itself easily supports the idea of creating a sovereign unit that is unified and bound by a single governmental authority. The treaty at Nerchinsk is an example of how mutual trade benefits from commercial markets encouraged peaceful negotiations between the Chinese Qing emperor and the Russian tsar that resulted in the defining and mapping the borders between the two states. Portolan charts, which were used since the 13th century developed the technique of representing a unified political space with bounded lines. For example, typical of many portolan charts representing Great Britain had England bound separately from Scotland as two distinct political entities. In the New World Spanish imperial cartography used the church as a symbol of a defined unified Catholic territory. The English colonies left their maps void of indigenous populations which left the lands mostly marked as empty and unoccupied. New World maps were created for the purpose of finding out where places and people were located in an ever expansive territory. In the Russian conquest and mapping of Siberia, maps were divided into regions where indigenous populations under certain jurisdiction were located to be contacted later. Centuries after their aspirations to map the extent of territorial states, lines or dotted lines on a map became the definition of a political units claim to an area. This result would occur from the significant cost to build an actual border in many areas.

=== The Peace of Westphalia ===
The Peace of Westphalia (German: Westfälischer Friede), is the collective name for two peace treaties signed in October 1648 in the Westphalian cities of Osnabrück and Münster. They ended the Thirty Years' War (1618–1648) and brought peace to the Holy Roman Empire, closing a calamitous period of European history that killed approximately eight million people. Holy Roman Emperor Ferdinand III, the kingdoms of France and Sweden, and their respective allies among the princes of the Holy Roman Empire, participated in the treaties.

The Thirty Years' War posed a religious conflict between Catholics Habsburgs and their counterpart Protestants. The end of this war allowed many nations to claim independence and gradually give birth to a new state system in nations. This was seen especially in the Holy Roman Empire, where several territorial states gained sovereignty and acquired new individual power. In fact such power included the independent state's ability to choose their own official religion rather than abiding to the nationwide religion, the obstruction of adhering to a higher authority, and equal state rights. Nowadays, it is thought by some that with the introduction of international organizations like the United Nations and regional states such as the European Union, territorial states would end up collapsing, however, that has not been the case. Apart from this, new economical, psychological, and technological advancements have brought new problems unto territorial states that could potentially bring the demise of territorial states.

== Early Modern Gunpowder Empires ==
The territorial state has been around for centuries, but it has taken many forms throughout history, one example of this is the Gunpowder empires of the early modern period. These gunpowder empires were characterized by a large central power which could purchase weaponry that smaller states could not afford, allowing them to expand rapidly. In the 15th century there were many states which used gunpowder but the three big “gunpowder empires” were the Ottoman, Safavid, and Mughal Empires. In the Early Modern Period these three Islamic Empires governed over vast swathes of territory which were not always homogeneous, in many cases, like the Ottoman Empire, smaller states were conquered for tax purposes and added to the empire. These gunpowder empires owed much of their stability to their large centralized governments and technologically advanced militaries. In addition, these Islamic Empires would spread their religion to conquered territories, while not forcing their subjects to accept their faith many received favorable status for converting. In addition to the big three Islamic Gunpowder Empires, there were three other states in East Asia that were significantly affected by the introduction of gunpowder. These three, China, Japan, and Korea also quickly adapted the use of muskets and professional standing armies. However, because of the relative power dynamics of East Asia, only the Chinese under the Ming and Qing dynasties was able to expand rapidly, thus making them a gunpowder empire.

=== Ottoman Empire ===
The Ottoman Empire was one of the most dangerous military forces in the 16th and 17th century, this Islamic empire whose roots are traced back to small Anatolian provinces, became an empire spanning Europe and the Arabic world. The Ottoman Empire in 1453 conquered Constantinople making the city their new capital and renaming it Istanbul. The Ottoman Empire developed and extensively used artillery, handheld cannons/firearms, and gun carriages to aid their horsemen in conquering most of Southeastern Europe and most Arabic states throughout the Middle East, and North Africa.

The Ottoman Empire had a centralized government in Istanbul which held power over the military, the provincial governors, and local religious leaders. In the Ottoman Empire, the military was controlled by the state, the lesser leaders of troops were all beholden to the Sultan, and in exchange, they were given territories to rule over. This tied the nobles to the central government. Because the elites handled most of the taxation and mustering of troops the Ottoman state was able to stay organized. Another critical feature of the Ottoman Empire is the freedom of religion; in the Empire, there was a system called the Millet system which gave non-Muslim religious communities autonomy to pick their rulers as long as they followed the laws and paid taxes. Also, local communities often were allowed to cling to certain customs, some were abolished, but the Sultan would leave many in place giving different provinces their own unique local cultures. These separate entities make the empire appear to be fragmented, but these policies served to unite the people, they were given enough freedom not to break away.

=== Safavid Empire ===
The weakest of these three territorial states, the Safavid dynasty had 1/5th the population of the Ottomans and 1/20th the population of the Mughal Empire, though numerically smaller the Safavid Empire was able to become a well respected and powerful nation from the 1500s until its fall in 1736. In 1514 the Persian's faced a military defeat at the hands of the Ottoman's, displaying the power of gunpowder. From then on the Safavid would expand their military to include these weapons. Like the other gunpowder empires, guns contributed to the Persian's imperial success, but they had more formidable weapons in their arsenal. The Safavid's were able to use the well respected Persian culture and Shia faith to tie its people together and gain global recognition. This is evidenced by the Mughal empire deferring to the Safavid's in military matters and the fact that Safavid officials could find positions in the Mughal or Ottoman Empires easily. The Safavid Empire was united by the Persian culture, the Persian language, and the Shia faith to unite its peoples but they still allowed the practice of other religions.

=== Mughal Empire ===
By the time he was invited by the Lodi governor of Lahore Daulat Khan to support his rebellion against Lodi Sultan Ibrahim Khan, Babur was familiar with gunpowder firearms and field artillery and a method for deploying them. Babur had employed Ottoman expert Ustad Ali Quli, who showed Babur the standard Ottoman formation—artillery and firearm-equipped infantry protected by wagons in the center, and mounted archers on both wings. Babur used this formation at the First Battle of Panipat in 1526 against Delhi Sultanate and in the Battle of khanwa in 1527 against Rajputs. In both of these battles, though superior in numbers but without the gunpowder weapons, the Delhi sultanate and the Rajput Confederacy were defeated. The decisive victory of the Timurid forces is one reason opponents rarely met Mughal princes in pitched battle over the course of the empire's history. The reigns of Akbar The Great, Shah Jahan and Aurangzeb have been described as a major height of Indian history. By the time of Aurangzeb, the Mughal army was predominantly composed of Indian Muslims, with tribal elements like the Sadaat-e-Bara forming the vanguard of the Mughal cavalry. The Mughal Empire became a powerful geopolitical entity with at times, 24.2% of the world population. The Mughals inherited elements of Persian culture and art, as did the Ottomans and Safavids. Indian Muslims maintained the dominance of artillery in India, and even after the fall of the Mughal empire, various non-Muslim Indian kingdoms continued to recruit Hindustani Muslims as artillery officers in their armies.

=== China ===
Although the Qing dynasty would make much more use of gunpowder than the Ming dynasty, the Ming did make significant strides forward in adapting this new technology and modernizing its armies. Arquebuses first appeared in Ming China in the early 1540s with many pirates initially using them. However, Ming officials were eventually able to capture pirates with guns and thus began manufacturing those guns. The effort by the Ming to modernize their armies was spearheaded by Qi Jiguang, who only realized the power of the musket after being defeated in battle by Japanese pirates. Jiguang trained his soldiers to function in small, flexible units that could be composed of any type of weapon, including the new guns that had only so recently entered China. Jiguang also carefully drilled his troops in the use of this new weapon by having them memorize a song that would assist them in loading their muskets. However, even with Jiguang's efforts muskets were not fully or effectively incorporated into the Ming armies. When Jiguang was reassigned to the Northern frontier of China, he found that the soldiers were too entrenched in the old ways and refused to adopt the new weapons, even though the accuracy of the musket was far superior to that of the traditional weapons they used.

The Ming were able to prove themselves against modern European armies in 1661 when the Ming dynasty launched an invasion of Taiwan which was under Dutch control at the time under the command of a Ming warlord named Zheng Chenggong. 10 years prior to this invasion, the Dutch had put down a peasant revolt in Taiwan with only 120 troops because the peasants were undisciplined and routed easily during their battle with the Dutch. Now, under Chenggong, the Chinese troops maintained their formation as they approached the Dutch forces, even though they were under fire from not only the Dutch land-based muskets but also by Dutch vessels which fired into Chenggong's troops at very close range. However, the highly trained and disciplined troops never broke ranks and when the Dutch realized this, along with the fact that they had been outflanked by a small force sent around them, they were the ones that fled the field of battle. After this point, the Dutch were never able to defeat Zheng's armies in a pitched battle.

After the fall of the Ming dynasty though, the Qing dynasty which replaced the Ming was much more willing to adopt these new technologies and use them to conquer their neighbours, thus ushering in a new age of Chinese dominance in East Asia. Their adaptation and use of the new gunpowder technology can be best seen in their conflict with the Russian Empire for control over the Amur Valley, which today is still the border region between China and Russia. When the Russians and the Chinese, along with Korean allies, first engaged each other, about 370 Russian troops attempted to engage a Qing and Korean allied force of about 1,000 troops. Although the Qing troops didn't perform as well as their Korean counterparts, they still contributed during the battle, especially as the Russians were retreating. During the second and final battle between these two forces, the Russians fielded 500 musketeers while the combined Qing and Korean force was able to muster 1,400 soldiers, of which only 400 were using the new gunpowder technology. Again, the Russians were defeated by the Qing and Korean force with the Koreans especially playing a vital role in both battles. Conflict between Russia and China would later cease due to the Treaty of Nerchinsk, which is a good example of diplomacy between two gunpowder empires, as the Russians also made use of gunpowder technologies to conquer their way across Eastern Europe and Central Asia to get to China in the first place.

== Laws and decrees within a territorial state ==
Laws authorized by the territorial prince were only valid within the defined region of his associated territorial state. These laws, which applied to the whole sovereign territory of the state, were also applicable to everyone living with the state, not just to its own citizens. This was based on the principle of territoriality which stated that all people were subject to the sovereignty and laws of the state on whose soil they were located. As a result of agreements between territorial states, legal regulations could also apply abroad. In the European Union it can be seen that this principle has survived in the long run, even to the present day.

Documents dating back to the ancient states, have shown texts that have lists or descriptions of capitals, locations of tax stations and forts. The documents would also have alliances that were made through marriages, or treaties.

== Rulers of territorial states ==
The aim of the respective territorial princes was to incorporate all the legal rights of a territory into their personal government and thus impose their personal claim to power over it. An early attempt at this was made by Henry the Lion of the House of Welf in the Stem Duchy of Saxony, but his plans foundered due to resistance of competing rulers who had opposing rights within the same territory. An early successful example of the creation of a territorial lordship is the Archduchy of Austria, which was able to be turned into a state lordship in 1359 through the forged privilegium maius. Other personal claims of territories can be dated back to ancient rulers. Augustus had claimed to expand the Roman borders to Ethiopia, Arabia, Egypt and central Europe. Sargon II had also stated that he had captured the territory of his enemies with them becoming part of his new claimed land. When ancient rulers would capture new land, made sure that the state would be all the same. Once rulers have conquered new land, it was viewed as expanding travels to their people. Another important intake of conquering land was the expansion of language, money and expanding political boundaries.

== Characteristics of a territorial state ==
The territorial state prior to the French Revolution can be defined by three basic criteria. They are as follows:

=== Direct military occupation ===
If a people finds itself under military control it becomes part of that military's territorial state, whether or not it identifies with the occupiers. While there are often many political units within a territorial state they will be categorized as part of the larger territorial state with coercive military power.

=== The capacity to tax ===
The ability to enforce taxation is an important coercive power for states to possess. To be able to tax other smaller political units would show that the ruling territorial state maintains a hegemonic control with economically coercive means.

=== A common executive ===
States during this period were often composed of multiple semi-autonomous political entities. Despite this, these semi-autonomous entities were often headed by members of the ruling family and can thus be classified as sharing a common executive.

== Non-territorial states ==
=== Personenverbandsstaat ===
Other types of states include the Personenverbandsstaat, which is a type of state in the early and high Middle Ages, in which a ruler does not rule over a territory with specific land boundaries with the support of administrative officials, as in a territorial state, but rather his sovereignty is based on a personal relationship of dependence between feudal lords and their vassals.

In 1939, the Austrian historian Theodor Mayer subordinated the feudal state as secondary to the Personenverbandsstaat, his concept of a personal dependency state, understanding it in contrast to the territorial state. This form of statehood, identified with the Holy Roman Empire, is described as the most complete form of medieval rule, completing conventional feudal structure of lordship and vassalage with the personal association between the nobility. But the applicability of this concept to cases outside of the Holy Roman Empire has been questioned, as by Susan Reynolds. The concept has also been questioned and superseded in German histography because of its bias and reductionism towards legitimating the Führerprinzip.

== See also ==
- Nation state
- Complex society

== Works cited ==
- Abramson, Scott F. (Winter 2017). "The Economic Origins of the Territorial State". International Organization. 71 (1). ISSN 0020–8183.
- Branch, Jordan (2013). The cartographic state : maps, territory and the origins of sovereignty. New York: Cambridge University Press. ISBN 9781107497191. OCLC 865078592.
- Herz, John H. (1957). "Rise and Demise of The Territorial State". World Politics. 9 (4): 475. doi:10.2307/2009421.
- Kolers, Avery (2002). "The Territorial State in Cosmopolitan Justice". Social Theory and Practice. 28 (1).
- Li, Jieli (2002). "State Fragmentation: Toward a Theoretical Understanding of the Territorial Power of the State". Sociological Theory. 20 (2).
- Kivelson, Valerie (2009). The imperial map : cartography and the mastery of empire. Akerman, James R. Chicago: University of Chicago Press. ISBN 9780226010762. OCLC 191090324.
- Parker, Geoffrey, (1996). The military revolution : military innovation and the rise of the West, 1500-1800 (2nd ed.). Cambridge: Cambridge University Press. ISBN 0521474264. OCLC 32968694.
- Perdue, Peter C. (2010). "Boundaries and Trade in the Early Modern World: Negotiations at Nerchinsk and Beijing". Eighteenth-Century Studies. 43(3).
- Richards, John F. (1997). "Early Modern India and World History". Journal of World History. 8 (2).
- Steinberg, Philip E. (2005). "Insularity, Sovereignty and Statehood: The Representation of Islands on Portolan Charts and the Construction of the Territorial State". Geografiska Annaler: Series B, Human Geography. 87 (4).
- Tilly, Charles (1990). Coercion, capital, and European states, AD 990-1990. Cambridge, Mass., USA: B. Blackwell. ISBN 155786067X. OCLC 20170025.
