= Helmut Beumann =

German historian (1912–1995)

- Born: October 23, 1912; Braunschweig, Germany
- Died: August 14, 1995 (aged 82); Marburg, Germany
- Education: Leipzig University; University of Berlin; University of Marburg
- Occupation: Historian
- Employer(s): University of Bonn; University of Marburg
- Known for: Research on the Ottonian dynasty
- Awards: Order of Merit of the Federal Republic of Germany (1984); Honorary doctorate, University of Graz (1988)

Helmut Karl Otto Beumann (23 October 1912, Braunschweig – 14 August 1995, Marburg) was a German historian.

== Biography ==
Beumann was the son of a civil servant and grew up in Bernburg. In 1931, he began studying history, German studies, philosophy, and Latin at Leipzig University. In 1932, he moved to Berlin and studied with Robert Holtzmann; he received his doctorate after a dissertation on the deeds and writs of the bishops of Halberstadt. At the Archiveschule in Berlin he met Carl Erdmann, whom he later praised as the "master of textual criticism and the history of ideas which it founded".

Beumann was a member of the Nazi Party, and in World War II fought on the Eastern front in 1941/42. He earned his habilitation in 1944 under Edmund E. Stengel at the University of Marburg, with a historical study of Widukind of Corvey.

After the war he became a privatdozent in Marburg, and in 1956 accepted a position at the University of Bonn. He returned to Marburg in 1964, to succeed Heinrich Büttner as professor. He became a corresponding member of the Monumenta Germaniae Historica in 1968, and was a founding member of the Constance Working Group for Medieval History, of which he became chairman in 1972. He retired as emeritus professor in 1981. Beumann's specialization was the Ottonian dynasty; his monograph on the dynasty was in its fifth edition in 2000.

Beumann was a corresponding member of the Austrian Academy of Sciences (1969), the Akademie der Wissenschaften und der Literatur of Mainz (1974), and the Braunschweigische Wissenschaftliche Gesellschaft (1984), and a member of the Historical Committee of the Bavarian Academy of Sciences and Humanities (1971), whose department of Jahrbücher der Deutschen Geschichte he led since 1979. In 1984, he was raised by Hans Krollmann to the Order of Merit of the Federal Republic of Germany; in 1987, he was recognized by the state of Baden-Württemberg. In 1988, he was given an honorary doctorate by University of Graz. He was president of the committee for the publication of the Regesta Imperii. Beumann is credited with raising Marburg's reputation to one of the best universities in Germany for the research and teaching of the Middle Ages.

== Publications ==
=== Monographs ===
- Die Ottonen. 5th edition. Stuttgart, 2000, ISBN 3-17-016473-2.
- Widukind von Korvei. Untersuchungen zur Geschichtsschreibung und Ideengeschichte des 10. Jahrhunderts. Weimar, 1950.

=== Edited collections ===
- Heidenmission und Kreuzzugsgedanke in der deutschen Ostpolitik des Mittelalters. Darmstadt, 1973.
- With Werner Schröder: Aspekte der Nationenbildung im Mittelalter. Ergebnisse der Marburger Rundgespräche 1972–1975. Sigmaringen, 1978. ISBN 3-7995-6101-3.
- With Werner Schröder: Frühmittelalterliche Ethnogenesen im Alpenraum. Sigmaringen, 1985. ISBN 3-7995-6105-6.
