= Elizabeth A. R. Brown =

American historian (1932–2024)

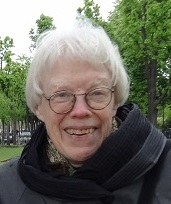
- Brown in 2013
- Born: Elizabeth Atkinson Rash Brown; February 16, 1932; Louisville, Kentucky, U.S.
- Died: August 8, 2024 (aged 92); New York City, U.S.
- Other name: Peggy Brown

Academic background
- Education: Swarthmore College (BA); Radcliffe College (MA, PhD)

Academic work
- Discipline: History
- Institutions: Brooklyn College
- Main interests: Medieval history, feudalism, French history, Philip the Fair, French Wars of Religion, Capetian France
- Notable works: "The Tyranny of a Construct: Feudalism and Historians of Medieval Europe"

Elizabeth Atkinson Rash Brown (February 16, 1932 – August 8, 2024) was an American historian. She was professor emerita of history at Brooklyn College, of the City University of New York, a scholar and published author, known for her writings on feudalism.

== Career ==
Brown received her B.A. from Swarthmore College and A.M. and PhD. from Radcliffe College and Harvard University. In 2009 Elizabeth A. R. Brown was elected the Second Vice-President of the Medieval Academy of America and in 2010–2011 served as its president. She taught at Brooklyn College in New York for decades and taught at Yale and Berkeley after retiring.

Brown first began publishing academic works in 1958, and wrote more than 130 articles and books in total. Much of her research focused on the Capetian dynasty in 13th- and 14th-century France.

In her groundbreaking 1974 article "The Tyranny of a Construct: Feudalism and Historians of Medieval Europe", Brown initiated an ongoing inconclusive discussion as to whether use of the term feudalism is a useful construct for understanding medieval society. In her critique, Brown highlights the potential for constructs to influence research agendas and warns constructs that we use to analyze the past can be exclusive.

In 1987, Brown was elected a Fellow of the Medieval Academy of America (MAA). She later served as the president of the MAA in 2010–2011.

Brown died on August 8, 2024, at the age of 92. In 2024, she gave a bequest to the University of Pennsylvania Libraries (the Penn Libraries) to establish an archive to hold the papers of medieval historians – including her own collection – and to endow a curator to manage it.

== Works ==
=== Monographs ===
- Customary Aids And Royal Finance in Capetian France: The Marriage Aid of Philip the Fair (hardcover, Medieval Academy of America) ISBN 0-915651-00-9
- "Franks, Burgundians, and Aquitanians" and the Royal Coronation Ceremony in France (Diane) ISBN 0-87169-827-7
- Jean Du Tillet and the French Wars of Religion: Five Tracts, 1562–1569 (hardcover, Medieval & Renaissance Texts & Studies) ISBN 0-86698-155-1
- The Monarchy of Capetian France and Royal Ceremonial (hardcover, Variorum) ISBN 0-86078-279-4
- Oxford Collection of the Drawings of Roger De Gaigni'Eres and the Royal Tombs of Saint-Denis (Diane) ISBN 0-87169-785-8
- Politics & Institutions in Capetian France (Ashgate) ISBN 0-86078-298-0

=== Articles ===
- —— (January 1958). "The Cistercians in the Latin Empire of Constantinople and Greece, 1204–1276". Traditio. 14: 63–120. doi:10.1017/S0362152900010072. ISSN 0362-1529.
- —— (Spring 1973). "Taxation and Morality in the Thirteenth and Fourteenth Centuries: Conscience and Political Power and the Kings of France". French Historical Studies. 8 (1): 1–28.
- —— (1974). "The Tyranny of a Construct: Feudalism and Historians of Medieval Europe". The American Historical Review. 79 (4): 1063–1088. doi:10.2307/1869563. ISSN 0002-8762. JSTOR 1869563.
- —— (April 1980). "The Ceremonial of Royal Succession in Capetian France: The Funeral of Philip V". Speculum. 55 (2): 266–293.
- —— (December 1981). "Reform and resistance to royal authority in fourteenth-century France: The leagues of 1314–1315". Parliaments, Estates and Representation. 1 (2): 109–137. doi:10.1080/02606755.1981.9525590. ISSN 0260-6755.
- —— (July 1988). "The Political Repercussions of Family Ties in the Early Fourteenth Century: The Marriage of Edward II of England and Isabelle of France". Speculum. 63 (3): 573–595. doi:10.2307/2852635. JSTOR 2852635.
- —— (Autumn 1990). "Authority, the Family, and the Dead in Late Medieval France". French Historical Studies. 16 (4): 803–832.
- —— (April 1991). "Philip V, Charles IV, and the Jews of France: The Alleged Expulsion of 1322". Speculum. 66 (2): 294–329.
