= Western studies (Germany) =

Western studies or western research (German: Westforschung) in Germany traditionally refers to area studies concerned with the countries and areas on Germany's western and southwestern borders, including France (particularly its eastern and northern parts), the Benelux countries and Switzerland, as well as the westernmost "border areas" within Germany, i.e. areas near the Dutch, Belgian, Luxembourgish, French and Swiss borders. The concept of western studies arose during the First World War, and like other forms of area studies, it was often motivated by geostrategic considerations. The traditional concept of western studies was largely abandoned with the onset of the Cold War, West Germany's western alignment and the western European integration process. It has largely been succeeded by the broader field of European studies.

In the communist world, including for example the Soviet Union, the German Democratic Republic and the People's Republic of Poland, "western studies" remained popular until the fall of communism, but encompassed studies of the western or "capitalist" world more broadly, including all of western Europe according to the Cold War definition of the term and North America. The western equivalent was Soviet and Communist studies.
