= Neukirchen an der Enknach =

- Municipality
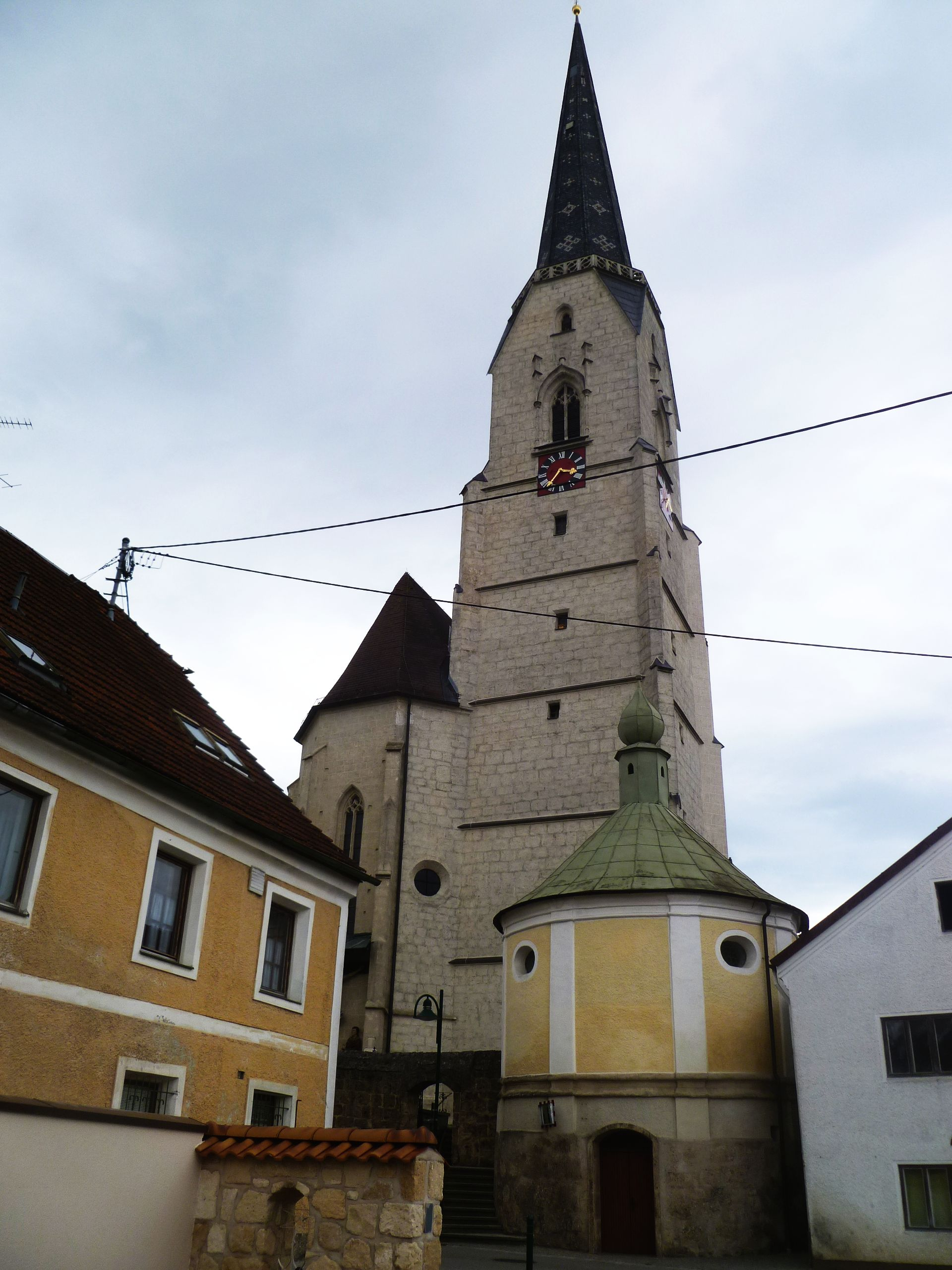

- Coat of arms

- Location within Austria
- Coordinates: 48°10′40″N 13°02′50″E
- Country: Austria
- State: Upper Austria
- District: Braunau am Inn

Government
  - Mayor: Johann Prillhofer (SPÖ)

Area
  - Total: 33.26 km^{2} (12.84 sq mi)
- Elevation: 411 m (1,348 ft)

Population (2018-01-01)
  - Total: 2,212
  - Density: 66.51/km^{2} (172.3/sq mi)
- Time zone: UTC+1 (CET)
  - Summer (DST): UTC+2 (CEST)
- Postal code: 5145
- Area code: 07729
- Vehicle registration: BR
- Website: www.neukirchen.ooe.gv.at

Neukirchen an der Enknach is a municipality in the district of Braunau am Inn in the Austrian state of Upper Austria.

== Geography ==
Neukirchen lies in the Innviertel. About 33 percent of the municipality is forest and 66 percent farmland.
