= Carl Erdmann =

German historian (1898–1945)

Carl Erdmann (17 November 1898 – 5 March 1945) was a German historian who specialized in medieval political and intellectual history. He is noted in particular for his study of the origins of the idea of crusading in medieval Latin Christendom, as well as his work on letter collections and correspondence among secular and ecclesiastical elites in the eleventh century. He is often mentioned alongside Percy Ernst Schramm and Ernst H. Kantorowicz as one of the most influential and important German scholars of medieval political culture in the twentieth century. His promising and remarkably prolific career was cut short by his death in the German army at the end of World War II.

== Education and scholarship ==
Erdmann's curriculum vitae was not typical for a German academic of his generation. Born in Dorpat (now Tartu, Estonia) and raised in Blankenburg am Harz, Saxony-Anhalt, he initially studied to be a Lutheran minister in Berlin, but abandoned this vocation in 1919 to study history in Munich. In the wake of Germany's economic collapse in the early 1920s, however, Erdmann's family could no longer support him and he left the university to take a job as a private tutor with a wealthy German family living in Portugal. Erdmann remained in Portugal for four years and developed a deep interest in the language, history and culture of the country, particularly its medieval religious heritage. His job allowed him time to explore the archives and libraries of Lisbon and other cities, where he collected and studied enough material to form the basis of a doctoral dissertation on the history of the Crusades in medieval Portugal.

In 1925, Erdmann returned to Germany and entered the University of Würzburg, where he earned his doctorate degree in 1926. Following the completion of his degree, he worked for several years at the Prussian Historical Institute in Rome (today the German Historical Institute) editing material relating to papal relations with Portugal and various other topics in church history that attracted his attention. In 1932, he submitted a manuscript at the University of Berlin on the origins of the idea of Crusade in the medieval West which earned him his Habilitation, or qualification for appointment to an academic professorship. He later expanded this thesis and published it under the title Die Entstehung des Kreuzugsgedanken (The Origins of the Idea of Crusading) in 1935.

In the meantime, Erdmann was recruited by the Monumenta Germaniae Historica (MGH), the prestigious historical institute dedicated to the critical editing and publishing of sources relating to German history in the medieval period. As an academic researcher (wissenschaftlicher Mitarbeiter) at the MGH, Erdmann was assigned the task of preparing editions for a number of important manuscript letter collections from the eleventh century relating to the history of the Investiture Controversy and Gregorian Reform. During this period, Erdmann made a number of critically important contributions to the study of epistolary literature in the Middle Ages and the role letters exchanged among bishops, abbots, kings and other elites played in communicating political ideas. His 1938 monograph, Studien zur Briefliteratur Deutschlands im XI. Jahrhundert (Studies on Epistolary Literature in Germany in the Eleventh Century) remains a classic on the subject. His final masterpiece, the critical edition of the letter collections from the reign of Henry IV, was largely completed by the early 1940s, but could not be printed due to wartime difficulties. It was finally sent to press by the MGH in the 1950s.

== Political problems and military service ==
Under normal circumstances, a position at the MGH would have led to a prestigious university chair in medieval history within a few years and no-one doubted that Erdmann was the brightest rising young star in his field. However, in 1933, and particularly after 1935, German academic institutions and universities began to implement political control in line with the policies of the new Nazi government. Although Erdmann continued to work at the MGH, his liberal views and refusal to join or endorse the Nazi Party effectively blacklisted him from further academic advancement, particularly at the university level. Furthermore, his book on the Crusades had been a thinly veiled critique of a political value system that raised war and imperialism to the level of a religious creed. During the late 1930s and early 1940s, Erdmann's research on the early Saxon monarchs of Germany (the Ottonians) also dissented from the politically correct orthodoxy, raising questions about the rise and rule of a dynasty which figured prominently in Nazi historical propaganda. Towards the end of 1943, Erdmann was conscripted into the Wehrmacht and the administration of the MGH, by now in the hands of academics friendly to the Nazi regime, declined to intervene on his behalf. He was trained as an Italian interpreter and sent to the Balkans where he served in Albania, and later in Croatia. He died of typhus in an army camp near Zagreb on 5 March 1945.

== Legacy ==
The Carl Erdmann Prize was established in his name by the VHD to award outstanding theses in the field of historical science.

== Selected bibliography ==
- Die Enstehung des Kreuzzugsgedanken, Forschungen zur Kirchen- und Geistesgeschichte 6 (Stuttgart, 1935). English trans.: The Origin of the Idea of Crusade, trans. M. W. Baldwin & Walter Goffart (Princeton, 1977).
- "Das Wappen und die Fahne der römischen Kirche", Quellen und Forschungen aus italienischen Archiven und Bibliotheken 22 (1930–31), pp. 227–255.
- "Die Briefe Meinhards von Bamberg", Neues Archiv 49 (1931–32), pp. 332–431.
- "Die Anfänge der staatlichen Propaganda im Investiturstreit," Historische Zeitschrift 154 (1936), pp. 491–512.
- (editor) Die Briefe Heinrichs IV. MGH Deutsches Mittelaler 1 (1937).
- Studien zur Briefliteratur Deutschlands im XI. Jahrhundert, Schriften des Reichinstituts 1 (Leipzig, 1938)
- "Das ottonische Reich als Imperium Romanum", Deutsches Archiv 6 (1943), pp. 412–441.

Erdmann's posthumously published work is collected in:

- Carl Erdmann: Forschungen zur politischen Ideenwelt des Frühmittelalters. Aus dem Nachlass des Verfassers, ed. Friedrich Baethgen (Berlin, 1951).
