= Friedrich Baethgen =

German historian

Friedrich Jürgen Baethgen (30 July 1890 – 18 June 1972) was a German historian born in Greifswald. He specialized in medieval studies and in history of the papacy.

He studied history at the Universities of Berlin and Heidelberg, earning his doctorate in 1913 under the guidance of Karl Hampe (1869–1936) with a thesis on Pope Innocent III. Afterwards, he was a lecturer and associate professor at Heidelberg, then becoming a professor of history at the University of Königsberg (from 1929). From 1939 to 1948 he taught classes in Berlin.

In 1927, Baethgen was appointed second secretary at the German Historical Institute in Rome. From 1948 to 1959, he was president of the Monumenta Germaniae Historica, and from 1956 to 1964, he was president of the Bayerischen Akademie der Wissenschaften (Bavarian Academy of Sciences). He never married.

== Published works ==
- Die Regentschaft Papst Innozenz III. im Königreich Sizilien (The reign of Pope Innocent III in the Kingdom of Sicily); (1914).
- Der Engelpapst (The "Angel Pope"); (1933).
- Beiträge zur Geschichte Cölestins (Contributions to the history of Pope Celestine V); (1934).
- Europa im Spätmittelalter (Europe in the late Middle Ages); (1951).
- Dante und Petrus de Vinea (Dante Alighieri and Peter de Vinea); (1955).
- Die Bayerische Akademie der Wissenschaften, 1909–1959 (The Bavarian Academy of Sciences, 1909–1959); (1959).
- Mediaevalia (1960).
- Das Gesamtverzeichnis der Mitglieder der Akademie, 1759–1959 (Roster of members of the Academy, 1759–1959); (1963).
- Deutschland und Europa im Spätmittelalter (Germany and Europe in the late Middle Ages); (1968).
- Schisma und Konzilzeit (1973).
