= Constitutional history =

Constitutional history is the area of historical study covering both written constitutions and uncodified constitutions, and became an academic discipline during the 19th century. The Oxford Companion to Law (1980) defined it as the study of the "origins, evolution and historical development" of the constitution of a community.

The English term is attributed to Henry Hallam, in his 1827 work The Constitutional History of England. It overlaps legal history and political history. For uncodified constitutions, the status of documents seen as contributing to the formation of a constitution has an aspect of diplomatics.

By the beginning of the 20th century, constitutional history, associated strongly with the "Victorian manner" in historiography, had come under criticism that questioned its relevance. Both before and after the period of so-called "traditional constitutional history" in the English-speaking world, its themes in political history have been seriously contested.

See Category:Constitutional history.

== Overview of national constitutional histories ==
=== European background ===
In the European tradition, Pocock in his book on the ancient constitution of England argued a common pattern, seen in François Hotman, a French lawyer of the 16th century, of valuing customary law, in tension with a code of law, and taking support for the customary to the point of creating a "historical myth" around it. Historical priority had political consequences for monarchy.

The status of monarchy in Europe played a large part in its constitutional history until the end of World War I. Shortly after 1918, the surviving European monarchies, diminished in numbers, were all examples of the constitutional monarchy, and the constitutions involved were all written, with the exception of the British monarchy which is part of an uncodified constitution. Mark Mazower states that "Most of the new constitutions began by stressing their democratic, national and republican character."

Category:Constitutional history of Austria

=== North American constitutions ===
The constitution of the United States, as a historical research area, was considered to be in decline by Menard in 1971, citing also George Athan Billias and Eric Cantor. Harry N. Scheiber in 1981 noted that some historians in the field saw a "genuine crisis", which he reported was widely attributed to competition from newer approaches in legal history to the behaviour of law courts. At this time there was a view that constitutional history was linked to liberalism and individual rights, and in tension with critical legal studies and its approach to legal history. Lewis Henry LaRue, from the side of critical legal studies, in 1987 defended the proposition that constitutional law should be studied in the context of constitutional history.

Category:Constitutional history of the United States

== Constitutional courts ==
Many nations have a constitutional court deciding matters of constitutional law. The force of judgements in such a court may be erga omnes, in other words applying broadly, rather than just to the case in question. Theodore Y. Blumoff writing of the Supreme Court of the United States stated that "Through its decisions and resulting precedents, the Court makes history as it decides it."

== Ancient Greece and Rome ==
The political history of Athens after the Peisistratids (from about 510 BCE onwards) is amply documented in literary sources, and has traditionally been cast as an evolution away from the tyrant (absolute ruler). John Robert Seeley in the 19th century took the major difference constitutionally between ancient Athens of that period and the Roman Republic to be that the Roman Senate, controlled by the patricians, was a deliberative assembly, while the assemblies of the plebeians were not.

De re publica, a partially-recovered work by Cicero, contains some political and constitutional history of the Roman Republic about three decades before its end. It used the concept of a mixed constitution going back to Aristotle, and its evolution. In Cicero's view an "ancestral constitution", an organic development based on the mos maiorum, had been ruptured some eighty years before, by the Gracchi and their reforms.

Category:Ancient Greek constitutions

== Medieval Christendom ==
From the High Middle Ages in Western Europe, the effective diplomacy of the Papacy, itself regulated by canon law, played a large part in the constitution of Latin Christendom as a polity, for example in the Crusades. The secular constitution of the Holy Roman Empire was uncodified. Its background was studied in depth in the 19th century by Georg Waitz, considered the effective founder of the German Verfassungsgeschichte, as part of legal history. His eight-volume work Deutsche Verfassungsgeschichte covered the period from the 9th to 12th centuries. The school of Waitz and Heinrich Brunner was later challenged by the "new constitutional history" of Theodor Mayer (de:Theodor Mayer (Historiker)), Otto Brunner and Walter Schlesinger.

The three-volume Constitutional History of England (1874–78) by William Stubbs was influenced by German scholars, particularly Waitz and Georg Ludwig von Maurer. The history of Anglo-Saxon England had standing in the Victorian period, to substantiate claims that the Westminster parliament descended from the witangemot and free assemblies.

Karl Leyser in the 1980s criticised the type of institutional history given of the Ottonian period Empire, on the grounds that it assumed without sufficient justification that such institutions existed in an operational sense. He also argued that parallels drawn between Germany and Anglo-Saxon England of the tenth century were ultimately quite misleading. Timothy Reuter in 2002 stated in this context that "constitutional history in the old style has clearly gone out of fashion."

== Whig history and constitutional history in the university ==
According to the final volume of The Cambridge Modern History (1910), Hallam's Constitutional History of England of 1827 contains the "authoritative Whig presentation of modern English history", and it "immediately took its place as a textbook in the Universities". The context is a contrast with the conservative History of Europe of Archibald Alison, which pointed to the French Revolution and the dangers of political change.

From the 1860s there were in the English-speaking world professors of constitutional history, with Cosmo Innes at Edinburgh becoming one, by change of official title, in 1862. Francis Lieber was Professor of Constitutional History at Columbia College Law School in the US from 1865. He lectured on The Rise of Our Constitution. He recommended reading for the Bill of Rights 1689, which he took to be foundational for the US Constitution, from Edward Shepherd Creasy's Rise and Progress of the English Constitution, then Hallam's book, then from an annotated edition of Jean-Louis de Lolme's work on the English constitution, before the legal works of William Blackstone and others.

With the work of Stubbs, succeeded by Samuel Rawson Gardiner as an author of British constitutional history derived from close reading of documents (traditional diplomatics), it played a central role in British historiography. During this period of "traditional constitutional history", the Second British Empire expanded, but its history initially was kept separate. The Whigs of the 18th century had often been supporters of American independence. Radicals of the 19th century distrusted imperial thinking.

In the twentieth century, Gardiner's approach was attacked by Roland Greene Usher (1880–1957), and both Herbert Butterfield and Lewis Namier rejected the tradition. The interwar period was, however, still a time when the history of the British Empire was very largely taught through constitutional history. A representative figure is the historian Kenneth Wheare. Butterfield, who coined the term "Whig history" as a criticism, by the period of World War II saw the imperial or "Tory" history as inseparable from it.
