= Johann Christoph Held =

German classical philologist and teacher

Johann Christoph Held from 1864 Ritter von Held (also Johann(es) C. Held and Johann Christoph von Held; born 21 December 1791 in Nuremberg; died 21 March 1873 in Bayreuth) was a German classical philologist and pedagogue.

== Life ==
Held came from a family of civil servants in Nuremberg. He attended elementary and Latin school in Nuremberg, before being admitted to the Nuremberg grammar school in 1799. He graduated with a distinction and was awarded a silver medal. From 1809 until 1811, he studied philology at the University of Heidelberg. He then moved to the University of Erlangen. He stayed here until 1812 and became a member of the Corps Franconia. In 1812 he began studying at the University of Leipzig, but returned to the University of Erlangen due to the wars of liberation that were raging around Leipzig. He passed his philological exam in Nuremberg at the end of 1813 in front of the five-member board, which included Georg Wilhelm Friedrich Hegel and Ludwig Heller.

Held went to Munich after passing his exams. There he took up the position of court master in the house of General Karl Friedrich August von Seydewitz. There he likely taught his son Max Graf von Seydewitz. In Munich he met the reform pedagogue Friedrich Thiersch, who would influence him. He was also able to use the library at Thiersch to write the work, Annotationes in Plutarchi vitam Alexandri M., which appeared in Thiersch's Acta Philologorum Monacensium in 1815 and 1816. This work was accepted as a dissertation by the university of Erlangen in 1814 and Held was awarded with his doctorate. After half a year he left Munich again and was a private tutor for various families in Nuremberg.

Held was offered a professorship for classes at the Königlich Bayerische Studienanstalt on 15 April 1815 (today: Gymnasium Christitan-Ernestinum) in Bayreuth. In 1835 he was appointed as its rector and in 1867 he retired. Afterwards, the discipline and quality of the school decreased under the new rector Johann Friedrich Degen. Held had comprehensively reformed the school and transformed it into a model school of its time. He was recognised in many ways for his achievements.

From 1901 until 1944 Heldstraße (today Wilhelminenstraße) in Bayreuth was named after him.

== Awards ==
- 1851 Order of Merit of Saint Michael
- 25 May 1860 Title Schulrat
- 3 August 1864 Knight of Order of Merit of the Bavarian Crown (Ennoblement)
- 25 May 1865 Cross of honor for Ludwigsordens

== Works ==
- Caii Julii Caesaris Commentarii de bello civili. Sulzbach 1822.
- Letters from Paris written in the months September, October, November 1830. Sulzbach 1831.
- Plutarchi Vitae Aemilii Pauli et Timoleontis. Sulzbach 1832.
- Platonis dialogi selecti in usum scholarum. 4 Bände, Sulzbach 1838–1846.
- Lexical exercises on Ciceros book on duties. Bayreuth 1858.

== Literature ==
- Hans-Michael Körner: Große Bayerische Biographische Enzyklopädie. De Gruyter Saur, Berlin 2005, S. 812.
- Jutta Franke: Held, Johann Christoph. In: Karl Bosl (Hrsg.): Bosls bayerische Biographie. Pustet, Regensburg 1983, ISBN 3-7917-0792-2, S. 327 f.(Digitalisation).
- Johann Christoph. In: Allgemeine Deutsche Biographie (ADB). Band 11, Duncker & Humblot, Leipzig 1880, S. 680 f.
- Karl Fries: Dr. Johann Christoph von Held. Ein Lebensbild. 3 Teile, Bayreuth 1874–1876.
