= Goucher (disambiguation) =

Goucher may refer to:

- Goucher College, a private liberal arts college in Towson, Maryland
- Goucher Boulevard, a road in Baltimore, Maryland
- Old Goucher College Buildings, a national historic district in Baltimore, Maryland
- USS Culebra Island (ARG-7), a repair ship originally ordered as liberty ship SS John F. Goucher

Persons with the surname Goucher:

- Adam Goucher, an American runner
- Candice Goucher, an American historian
- Dave Goucher, an American sportscaster
- John Goucher, an American Methodist minister and college administrator
- Joseph Goucher, an American actor and director known professionally as Eddie Dowling
- Kara Goucher, an American runner
- Len Goucher, a Canadian politician
- Obediah Parker Goucher, a Nova Scotia political figure
