= František Graus =

Czech historian

- Born: 14 December 1921; Brno, Czechoslovakia
- Died: 1 May 1989 (aged 67); Basel, Switzerland
- Occupation: Historian
- Writing career
- Genres: Medieval history, social history

František Graus (14 December 1921 – 1 May 1989) was a Czech historian whose work focused on the social and economic history of medieval Europe, particularly the history of social movements and of ethnic and religious minorities.

== Life and academic career ==
Born to a prosperous German-speaking Jewish family in Brno in 1921, the young Graus was interned at Theresienstadt during World War II and lost most of his family in the Holocaust. Following the war, he returned to Prague, where he completed his degree in at the Charles University and began teaching medieval history at the Czech state Academy of Sciences. Following the Prague Spring of 1968, during which a nascent socialist reform movement was put down by an invasion of Soviet and other Warsaw Pact military forces, Graus emigrated and sought asylum in West Germany. Already a renowned scholar, he lectured for several years at universities in Giessen and Konstanz and in 1972 was awarded a chair in medieval history at the University of Basel in Switzerland, where he remained until his death.

== Scholarship ==
Graus made important contributions to several areas of medieval history which in the 1960s and 70's did not yet receive a great deal of attention from most scholars in the West German historical academy. Graus's Czech doctoral thesis, published in 1965 as Volk, Herrscher und Heiliger im Reich der Merowinger (People, Ruler and Saint in the Merovingian Kingdom) was a groundbreaking study of how the early medieval hagiographic texts – dismissed by most historians then as pious fictions with little or no historical value – contained important insights on popular religious sentiments and social mentalities. His later work attempted to draw broad connections among diverse social phenomena, such as anti-Semitism, urban poverty, and religious fanaticism.

Graus's methodologies and historical views were certainly informed by Marxism, though his conclusions and interpretations were not always Marxist in a doctrinaire way. As with historians of the French Annales School, Marxist questions, as well as his own Jewish heritage and experience in the war, lead Graus to examine underlying assumptions about power, ethnic identity, social status and the marginalization of certain groups in medieval society. He thus focused on topics such as the Black Death and peasant revolts that were traditionally treated within a broader scheme of political history, but from a perspective that attempted to get at how common medieval people thought about social justice, violence, ethnicity and religion. His 1980 book on the history of the western Slavic peoples of Europe replaced the notion of a "history of the Slavic nations" with the "history of Slavic national consciousness." Rather than viewing ethnically defined nations and nation states as historic inevitabilities, Graus tried to understand the evolution of national consciousness and sensibilities as historically contingent processes – an idea which, although met with some skepticism at the time, foreshadowed the work of contemporary scholars like Benedict Anderson and Herwig Wolfram.

Graus was one of the very few, if not the only, prominent, leftist, Jewish medievalists working in West Germany and the German-speaking academy in the post-war period (historians working in the GDR were expected, of course, to present a socialist gloss on their work as a matter of policy). Over the course of his career, much of Graus's work, and particularly his interpretation of social and political institutions, sought to offer a counterbalance to the predominant models of what the Germans call Verfassungsgeschichte, represented by historians like Karl Bosl, Walter Schlesinger and Otto Brunner and which had a strongly conservative-nationalist underpinning. Graus was unsettled by these theories and worked to place the study of medieval social history on a different footing, although not always successfully.

== Selected works ==
- Volk, Herrscher und Heiliger im Reich der Merowinger: Studien zur Hagiographie der Merowingerzeit (Prague, 1965).
- Struktur und Geschichte: 3 Volksaufstände im mittelalterlichen Prag, Vorträge und Forschungen, Sonderband 7 (Sigmaringen, 1971),
- Die Nationenbildung der Westslawen im Mittelalter (Sigmaringen, 1980).
- (editor) Mentalitäten im Mittelalter: methodische und inhaltliche Probleme, Vorträge und Forschungen 35 (Sigmaringen, 1987).
- Pest - Geissler - Judenmorde : das 14. Jahrhundert als Krisenzeit, 3rd. ed (Göttingen, 1994).
