= Peter Herde =

German historian

Peter Herde (born 5 February 1933) is a German historian. His research activities range from fundamental work on papal diplomatics of the Middle Ages to the history of the country up to the Second World War.

== Life ==
Herd was born in 1933 in Racibórz, Upper Silesia. He was the son of deputy headmaster Reinhard Herde and Hildegard Herde. He spent his childhood and the first years of his youth in Ratibor. Since autumn 1943 he attended the Realgymnasium Ratibor. The family fled from the Red Army at the end of January 1945 and found their new home in Arnsberg. In Neheim-Hüsten he passed his Abitur in 1953. In the summer semester of 1953 he began studying physics and mathematics at the University of Heidelberg. Fritz Ernst aroused Herde's interest in history through his lectures. In 1954 Herde went to LMU Munich to study history, German and English literature. Through Friedrich Baethgen, Herde turned to the history of the pope and the empire of the late Middle Ages. Bernhard Bischoff gave him an understanding of palaeography, the history of Medieval Latin literature and Manuscript Studies. Through Peter Acht he began to deal with the papal documents of the 13th century. In 1958, under the supervision of Peter Acht, he was awarded a doctorate in philosophy in Munich with the thesis Contributions to papal chancery and documents in the 13th century. The dissertation became a standard in the history of the papal chancellery and diplomacy. The work appeared in 1967 in a second, considerably extended edition. One year after his doctorate, Herde's first scientific essay Gestaltung und Krisis christlich-jüdischen Verhältnisses in Regensburg am Ende des Mittelalters was published. The essay was a result of his work on the edition of the documents and records on the history of the Jews in Regensburg.

From 1960 to 1962 he worked at the German Historical Institute in Rome. The director Walther Holtzmann exerted a great influence on him. In Rome he established friendly relations with Hermann Goldbrunner, Dieter Girgensohn, Norbert Kamp, Arnold Esch, Rudolf Hiestand and Rupert Hacker. His habilitation dealt with the Formularium audientie litterarum contradictarum. After his habilitation in 1965 – also with Peter Acht – he worked as a lecturer in Munich. Already in 1968, at the age of 35, he was appointed full professor for middle and modern history at the University of Frankfurt. He took up the position the following year. From 4 June 1976, he taught as a full professor of history, in particular medieval history, regional history and historical ancillary sciences, at the Julius-Maximilians-Universität Würzburg. In 2001 he was retired. His farewell lecture, in which he took a critical look at recent developments in German higher education, was held on 16 June 2001 at a symposium in the Museumszentrum Lorsch.

== Main areas of research ==
Herde works in the field of medieval and modern history, especially on the history of the empire and the papacy of the later Middle Ages, on the social and intellectual history of Italian humanism and on the intellectual history of the Risorgimento. His further research interests include the auxiliary sciences of history, the Bavarian Landesgeschichte and the history of the Second World War. His Munich dissertation, first published in 1961, also received great international acclaim. The work was published in 1967 in a second improved and extended edition and became a standard work of papal diplomacy of the 13th century. With the edition and investigation of the formula books of the Audientia litterarum contradictarum he published a two-volume and almost 1400-page Munich habilitation thesis. The work was methodologically innovative, since Herde linked questions of document science and canonism.

Herde conducted research on late medieval papal documents, on the history of Italy, especially Florence in the Renaissance and the history of Sicily. About Charles I of Anjou Herde published an extensive article in the Dizionario Biografico degli Italiani. This study on the first Angevinen on the Sicilian throne resulted in a biography in 1979. In Würzburg, Herde dealt intensively with Franconian history and the history of the empire and pope in the 13th century. But Herde also devoted himself to problems of the 19th century. Among other things he examined the relations of Bavaria and the Holy See in the time of the beginning Kulturkampf. Herde published a standard work in 1981 with his biography of Pope Celestine V. The work was published in Italian translation in 2004 and was supplemented in 2008 by his Monumenta Germaniae Historica edition of the oldest vitae of "papa angelicus". With his work, published in 1986, Herde presented for the first time the history of medieval Ghibellines and Guelphs. Together with his student Thomas Frenz, he published in 2000 the letter and memorial book of the Passau Cathedral dean Albert von Behaim of 1246. Already in the 1980s, Herde has been working on a biography of Antipope Boniface VII. He published numerous individual studies on him. After decades of research, the first volume of the biography with the three chapters "Youth and ecclesiastical consecration", "On the way to the papal throne" and "Election to the pope, consecration and coronation" could be published in 2015 in the series "Popes and Papacy". The challenge was above all to prepare the time appropriately historiographically. Numerous details about his early life are not contemporary testimonies, but were only reproached to him in the later Boniface trial.

Since the 1990s, the Upper Silesian-born Herde has also devoted itself to Silesian history. In 2001, the edition of the Italian files on the 1921 referendum in Upper Silesia resulted from this occupation. At the end of the century Herde was more intensively engaged in the history of historical studies. This resulted in numerous studies on Würzburg historians such as Anton Chroust (1998/2012), Max Buchner (2002) and Michael Seidlmayer (2007/2012). Herde investigated the background of the failed appeals of Franz Schnabel to Heidelberg and Hermann Heimpel to Munich. Herde thoroughly evaluated the files of the American military government. Together with the Israeli historian Benjamin Z. Kedar, he presented an investigation of the historian Karl Bosl in 2011, which led to a discussion and reassessment of Bosl's Nazi past. The German translation was published in a substantially extended version in 2016. At Bosl, they observed "a precarious coexistence of rejection and concessions" with the system. According to their research, Bosl had behaved in a highly system-compliant manner under National Socialism and falsely presented himself as a resistance fighter. Some historians criticized the depiction of Kedar and Herde and pointed out discrepancies. Dirk Walter criticised the lack of comparison of Bosl's career during the Nazi era with that of other colleagues like Theodor Schieder.

Herde presented numerous works on the history of the Second World War, including two monographs on the secret flight connection between the Axis Powers and Japan ('The Flight to Japan', 2000) and on Japanese occupation policy in Southeast Asia during the Second World War and its consequences ('Greater East Asian Prosperity Sphere', 2002). However, he only dealt with Indonesia and the Philippines and did not use Japanese sources for his account. Herde noted in his study that "despite all controls and despite censorship [...] Japanese rule [...] in the Philippines was not totalitarianism of a Soviet or Nazi nature". For a decade, Herde researched the months of August and September in the National Archives and Records Administration in Washington, where millions of pages of listening material are stored. This resulted in a study published in 2018 on the triangular relationship between the European Axis powers, Japan and the USSR during the Second World War. Half of the study consists of documentation. The sources it contains are telegrams sent between the Foreign Ministry in Tokyo and its diplomatic or consular missions abroad, intercepted and decoded by US agencies from 1942 onwards.

== Honours and memberships ==
Herde has been awarded numerous scientific honors and memberships for his research. He is an elected member of many scientific societies, academies and commissions, including the Scientific Society at the Johann Wolfgang Goethe University Frankfurt am Main (since 2010 as honorary member), the "Gesellschaft für fränkische Geschichte", the Historische Kommission für Schlesien, the Medieval Academy of America, the Royal Historical Society in London and the Commission internationale de diplomatique (since 1970). Celestine's birthplace, Sant'Angelo Limosano, has made him an honorary citizen for his work on this pope and saint. He accepted a guest professorship from 1966 to 1967 at the University of California, Berkeley. Among his academic students were Robert Helmholtz, Milo Kearney and John McCullough. Further visiting professorships led Herde to the University of Washington in 1971, to the Institute for Advanced Study in Princeton in 1971/72 and 1984, to the University of Chicago in 1973 and to Dumbarton Oaks in 1979. In 1998 he was honored on his 65th birthday with an extensive commemorative publication. On the occasion of his 70th birthday in 2003 Herde was honoured by a scientific colloquium in Lorsch an der Bergstraße and in 2008 by another colloquium. Herde declined calls to the University of California in Los Angeles as successor of Gerhart B. Ladner and to LMU Munich as successor of Peter Acht.

== Writings ==
Monographs

- Beiträge zum päpstlichen Kanzlei- und Urkundenwesen im dreizehnten Jahrhundert (Münchener historische Studien, Abteilung Geschichtliche Hilfswissenschaft. Vol. 1). Lassleben, Kallmünz/Opf. 1961, 2nd edition 1967; plus Dissertation, Munich 1962.
- Audientia litterarum contradictarum. Untersuchungen über die päpstlichen Justizbriefe und die päpstliche Delegationsgerichtsbarkeit vom 13. bis zum Beginn des 16. Jahrhunderts (Bibliothek des Deutschen Historischen Instituts in Rom. Vols. 31 and 32). 2 volumes, Niemeyer, Tübingen 1970, ISBN 3-484-80030-5, zugleich Habilitationsschrift, Munich 1965.
- Dante als Florentiner Politiker (Frankfurter historische Vorträge. Issue 3). Steiner, Wiesbaden 1976, ISBN 3-515-02506-5.
- Karl I. von Anjou (Urban-Taschenbücher. Vol. 305). Kohlhammer, Stuttgart among others 1979, ISBN 3-17-005420-1.
- Pearl Harbor, 7. Dezember 1941. Der Ausbruch des Krieges zwischen Japan und den Vereinigten Staaten und die Ausweitung des europäischen Krieges zum 2. Weltkrieg (Impulse der Forschung. Vol. 33). Wissenschaftliche Buchgesellschaft, Darmstadt 1980, ISBN 3-534-07555-2.
- Cölestin V. (Päpste und Papsttum. Vol. 16). Hiersemann, Stuttgart 1981, ISBN 3-7772-8102-6.
- Italien, Deutschland und der Weg in den Krieg im Pazifik 1941 (Sitzungsberichte der Wissenschaftlichen Gesellschaft an der Johann-Wolfgang-Goethe-Universität Frankfurt am Main. Vol. 20, Nr. 1). Steiner, Wiesbaden 1983, ISBN 3-515-04001-3.
- Guelfen und Neoguelfen. Zur Geschichte einer nationalen Ideologie vom Mittelalter zum Risorgimento (Sitzungsberichte der Wissenschaftlichen Gesellschaft an der Johann-Wolfgang-Goethe-Universität Frankfurt am Main. Vol. 22, Nr. 2). Steiner-Verlag-Wiesbaden-GmbH, Stuttgart 1986, ISBN 3-515-04596-1.
- Die Katastrophe vor Rom im August 1167. Eine historisch-epidemiologische Studie zum vierten Italienzug Friedrichs I. Barbarossa (Sitzungsberichte der Wissenschaftlichen Gesellschaft an der Johann-Wolfgang-Goethe-Universität Frankfurt am Main. Vol. 27, Nr. 4). Steiner, Stuttgart 1991, ISBN 3-515-05878-8.
- Abhandlungen zur fränkischen und bayerischen Kirchengeschichte und zu den christlich-jüdischen Beziehungen (Quellen und Forschungen zur Geschichte des Bistums und Hochstifts Würzburg. Vol. 46). Schöningh, Würzburg 1996, ISBN 3-87717-049-8.
- Der Japanflug. Planungen und Verwirklichung einer Flugverbindung zwischen den Achsenmächten und Japan 1942–1945 (Sitzungsberichte der Wissenschaftlichen Gesellschaft an der Johann-Wolfgang-Goethe-Universität Frankfurt am Main. Vol. 38, Nr. 3). Steiner, Stuttgart 2000, ISBN 3-515-07587-9.
- Großostasiatische Wohlstandssphäre. Die japanische Besatzungspolitik auf den Philippinen und in Indonesien im Zweiten Weltkrieg und ihre Folgen (Sitzungsberichte der Wissenschaftlichen Gesellschaft an der Johann-Wolfgang-Goethe-Universität Frankfurt am Main. Vol. 39, Nr. 4). Steiner, Stuttgart 2002, ISBN 3-515-08033-3.
- Kontinuitäten und Diskontinuitäten im Übergang vom Nationalsozialismus zum demokratischen Neubeginn. Die gescheiterten Berufungen von Hermann Heimpel nach München (1944–1946) und von Franz Schnabel nach Heidelberg (1946–1947) (Hefte zur bayerischen Landesgeschichte. Heft 5). Kommission für Bayerische Landesgeschichte, Munich 2007, ISBN 978-3-7696-6532-1.
- mit Benjamin Z. Kedar: A Bavarian historian reinvents himself. Karl Bosl and the Third Reich. Hebrew University Magnes Press, Jerusalem 2011, ISBN 978-965-493-564-7.
  - with Benjamin Z. Kedar: Karl Bosl im „Dritten Reich“. De Gruyter Oldenbourg among others, Berlin u. a. 2016, ISBN 978-3-11-041256-7 (deutsche Übersetzung und wesentlich erweiterte Fassung)

As publisher

- with Anton Schindling: Beiträge zur Bildungsgeschichte. Gewidmet Peter Baumgart anläßlich seines 65. Geburtstages (Quellen und Forschungen zur Geschichte des Bistums und Hochstifts Würzburg. Vol. 53). Schöningh, Würzburg 1998, ISBN 3-87717-057-9.
- Italien und Oberschlesien 1919–1922. Italienische Diplomatie und Besatzungstruppen im Umfeld der Volksabstimmung in Oberschlesien und der Teilung des Landes. Vol. 1: Dokumente zur italienischen Politik in der oberschlesischen Frage 1919–1921 (Schlesische Forschungen. Band 8). Königshausen und Neumann, Würzburg 2001, ISBN 3-8260-2035-9.
- with Hermann Jakobs: Papsturkunde und europäisches Urkundenwesen. Studien zu ihrer formalen und rechtlichen Kohärenz vom 11. bis 15. Jahrhundert (Archiv für Diplomatik, Schriftgeschichte, Siegel- und Wappenkunde. Special issue 7). Böhlau, Cologne among others 1999, ISBN 3-412-10298-9.

Editions

- with Thomas Frenz: Das Brief- und Memorialbuch des Albert Behaim (Monumenta Germaniae Historica. Epistolae. 2a, Briefe des späteren Mittelalters. Vol. 1). Monumenta Germaniae Historica, Munich 2000, ISBN 3-88612-091-0.
- Die ältesten Viten Papst Cölestins V. (Peters vom Morrone) (Monumenta Germaniae Historica, Scriptores rerum Germanicarum, nova series. Vol. 23). Hahn, Hannover 2008, ISBN 978-3-7752-0223-7.

Collections of essays

- Gesammelte Abhandlungen und Aufsätze. Hiersemann, Stuttgart, ISBN 978-3-7772-9713-2.
  - Volume 1: Von Dante zum Risorgimento. Studien zur Geistes- und Sozialgeschichte Italiens. 1997, ISBN 3-7772-9714-3.
  - Volume 2: Studien zur Papst- und Reichsgeschichte, zur Geschichte des Mittelmeerraumes und zum kanonischen Recht im Mittelalter. 2 half volumes, 2002 and 2005, ISBN 3-7772-0214-2, ISBN 3-7772-0514-1.
  - Volume 3: Diplomatik, Kanonistik, Paläographie. Studien zu den historischen Grundwissenschaften. 2008, ISBN 978-3-7772-0810-7.

== Literature ==
- Karl Borchardt, Enno Bünz: Peter Herde zum achtzigsten Geburtstag. In Archiv für Diplomatik 60 (2014), pp. 11–34.
- Karl Borchardt und Enno Bünz (ed.): Forschungen zur Reichs-, Papst- und Landesgeschichte. Peter Herde zum 65. Geburtstag von Freunden, Schülern und Kollegen dargebracht. Hiersemann, Stuttgart 1998, ISBN 3-7772-9803-4 (complete work), ISBN 3-7772-9805-0 (vol. 1), ISBN 3-7772-9806-9 (vol. 2) (with Bibliography).
- Karl Borchardt und Enno Bünz (ed.): Forschungen zur bayerischen und fränkischen Geschichte. Peter Herde zum 65. Geburtstag von Freunden, Schülern und Kollegen dargebracht (Quellen und Forschungen zur Geschichte des Bistums und Hochstifts Würzburg. Vol. 52). Schöningh, Würzburg 1998, ISBN 3-87717-056-0.
- Ralph Hübner (ed.): Who is Who in der Bundesrepublik Deutschland. 13. Ausgabe, Verlag für Personalenzyklopädien AG, Zug 2007, ISBN 978-3-7290-0064-3, p. 201.
- Wer ist wer? Das deutsche Who's Who. 47. Ausgabe 2008/09, Schmidt-Römhild, Lübeck 2008, ISBN 978-3-7950-2046-0, p. 508.
- Kürschners Deutscher Gelehrten-Kalender. 22nd edition, vol. II: H–L. Saur, Munich 2009, ISBN 978-3-598-23629-7 (4 volumes), ISSN 1616-8399, p. 1575.
