= The History of the Jews in Egypt and Syria under Mamluk Rule =

- Authors: Eliyahu Ashtor
- Original title: תולדות היהודים במצרים ובסוריה תחת שלטון הממלוכים
- Language: Hebrew
- Publication place: Israel

The History of the Jews in Egypt and Syria under Mamluk Rule is the name of a series of books by Eliyahu Ashtor, an orientalist and scholar of the Levant in the Middle Ages. The series includes three volumes, published between 1944 and 1970, describing the history of the Jewish communities in Egypt and Syria and their leaders during the Mamluk rule, from 1250 CE (the murder of the last Ayyubid amir Turanshah and the takeover of rule in Egypt by the Bahri Mamluks) until 1517 (the Ottoman conquest of Egypt). In the first two volumes, Ashtor incorporated information based on documents and records from the researched time period, from Muslim, Christian and Jewish sources, including documents from the Cairo Genizah, being the first to do so.

== Background to Writing the Book ==
The first volume of the book was a rewrite of Ashtor's doctoral dissertation, which he submitted to the senate of the Hebrew University in 1943. Ashtor began collecting material to use for writing the dissertation already in 1937, when he was a student at the University of Vienna. The sources included information he collected from the Arabic historiographies of that period, both printed and manuscript, which were available at the Imperial Library in Vienna. Additional information he found in manuscripts from libraries in Berlin, Gotha and Leiden, which he accessed through the interlibrary loan department of the Imperial Library. At that time, he was also first exposed to the Cairo Genizah, as he would translate, for Professor Simha Assaf, Arabic documents from the Genizah which were located in Vienna. Ashtor even began writing the dissertation in Vienna, however after the Nazi annexation of Austria in 1938, he fled from Vienna to Jerusalem, where he continued his doctoral studies at the Hebrew University under the mentorship of orientalist L.A. Mayer, while also working at the National Library. During this period he was able access additional sources from the era he was researching, including documents from the Cairo Genizah, and among other things managed to date and attribute several undated documents to the Mamluk period.

In the spring of 1943 he received the Motzkin Prize, and used it to fund a month-long visit to the Zahiriyya Library in Damascus, the Ahmadian madrasa library in Aleppo and the Jesuit university in Beirut, in order to collect additional sources for his doctoral dissertation. That summer he submitted the dissertation and was granted a PhD in philosophy.

After receiving his degree, he rewrote several chapters of the dissertation, made updates based on sources previously unknown to him, and published it in 1944 as the first volume of his book "The History of the Jews in Egypt and Syria under Mamluk Rule", the Bahri Mamluk period.

To write the second volume, on "The Jews in Egypt and Syria under Mamluk Rule", the Burji (Circassian) Mamluk period, Ashtor received the Maurice and Charlotte Amalia Warburg Prize, becoming the first researcher to receive it. With the prize money he was able to reduce some of his work at the National Library and devote more time to researching the period covered in the book, as well as order reproductions of Arabic manuscripts from Istanbul and Oxford. The second volume is primarily based on contemporary sources, including Arabic chronicles, responsa books by rabbis, travelogues by Jewish and Christian pilgrims to the Land of Israel, and reports by merchants, mostly Christians. He began working on the book in 1944 and finished writing it four years later, in 1948, but it was only printed in 1951. The third volume was published much later, in 1970.

Ashtor almost completely skipped describing the Jewish communities in the Land of Israel during this period, despite it also being ruled by the Mamluks at that time, because he felt that "the history of the Jews in the Land of Israel requires special and superior investigation into every detail because of the unique role of the country in Jewish history. The qualified scientific circles recognized that this research needs to be carried out by a learned society... so why should an individual compete with a joint enterprise of learned scholars?"

== Review articles on the book series ==
- A. Ben Ya'akov, For "The History of the Jews in Egypt and Syria", Had-HaMizrah, September 17, 1944 (review article on the first volume).
- Michael Assaf, History of the Jews in Egypt and Syria, Davar, January 5, 1945 (review article on the first volume).
- A. Ben Ya'akov, To the history of the Jews in Egypt and Syria, Had-HaMizrah, January 31, 1951 (review article on the second volume).
- David Tamar, New material on the life of the Jews under the rule of the Mamluks, Ma'ariv, March 26, 1971 (review article on the third volume).
