= Benjamin Z. Kedar =

Israeli professor of history (born 1938)

- בנימין זאב קדר
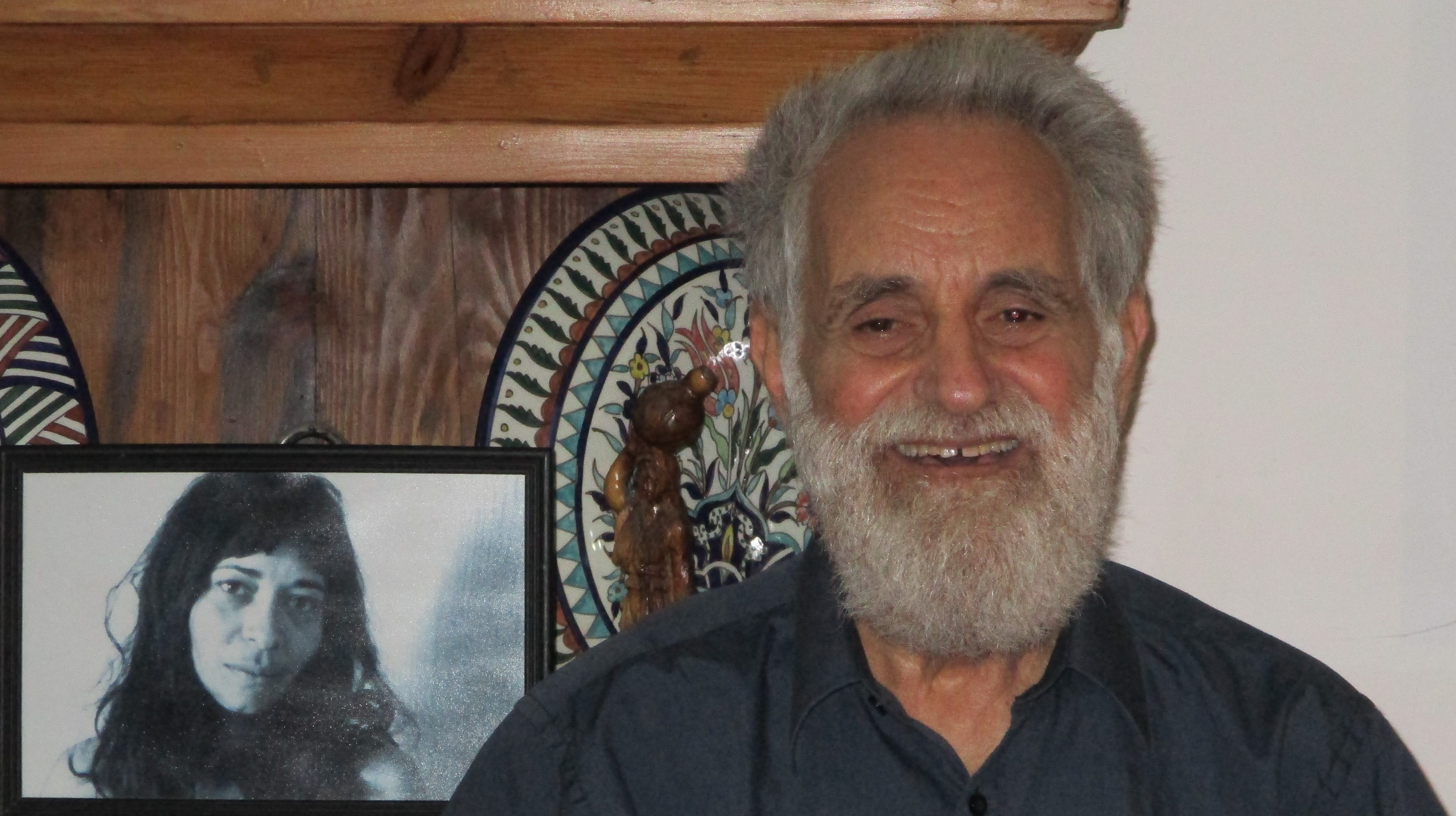
- Born: 2 September 1938 (age 88); Nitra, Czechoslovakia
- Occupations: Historian, academic, scholar

Academic background
- Education: Hebrew University of Jerusalem, Yale University

Academic work
- Institutions: Hebrew University & Israel Institute for Advanced Studies
- Main interests: Comparative history, crusades, medieval language texts

Benjamin Ze'ev Kedar (Hebrew: בנימין זאב קדר; born 2 September 1938) is an Israeli historian, professor emeritus of History at the Hebrew University of Jerusalem. He was president of the international Society for the Study of the Crusades and the Latin East (1995–2002), chairman of the board of the Israel Antiquities Authority (2000–12) and vice-president of the Israel Academy of Sciences and Humanities (2010–15). He is 2019 The EMET Prize for Art, Science and Culture laureate in history, the 2020 Israel Prize laureate in history research in 2024 he won the Prix Gustave Schlumberger de l’Académie des Inscriptions et Belles-Lettres. and in 2026 he awarded the MGH Freiherr vom Stein Medal from the Monumenta Germaniae Historica.

== Biography ==
Kedar was born in Nitra, Czechoslovakia to Samuel Kraus and Lydie Jeiteles-Kraus. Both his parents were physicians. In 1944–45, his family avoided deportation to Auschwitz by hiding for seven months with Slovak peasants. He immigrated to Israel with the Youth Aliyah in 1949. His parents arrived about two months later, and after a few months he went to live with them in Kfar Netter in the Sharon Plain. In 1952, he completed elementary school in Even Yehuda, and in 1956 the Fifth Municipal High School in Tel Aviv. He earned a BA in history and sociology at the Hebrew University of Jerusalem, where he continued to graduate studies.

Kedar wrote his MA thesis under the supervision of Joshua Prawer (1964–1965). During the Lavon Affair, he was among the leaders of the "Student Movement for Democracy," that opposed David Ben-Gurion's purported authoritarianism. He wrote his PhD thesis on medieval history at Yale University, under the supervision of Roberto Sabatino Lopez, submitting his dissertation in 1969.

Kedar returned to Israel in the same year and joined the faculty of the Hebrew University. In 1976–77 he was a Humboldt Foundation research fellow at the Monumenta Germaniae Historica, Munich, in 1981–82 and again in 1997–98 a member of the Institute for Advanced Study at Princeton, and in 1983–84 a fellow of the Israel Institute for Advanced Studies in Jerusalem. In 1986, he was appointed full professor at Hebrew University. Until her death in 2015, he was married to Nurith Kenaan-Kedar, professor of Art History at Tel Aviv University, a descendant of the Shertok family and granddaughter of Baruch Katinsky, one of the founders of Tel Aviv. He has two sons (from a previous marriage), Arnon and Yarden.

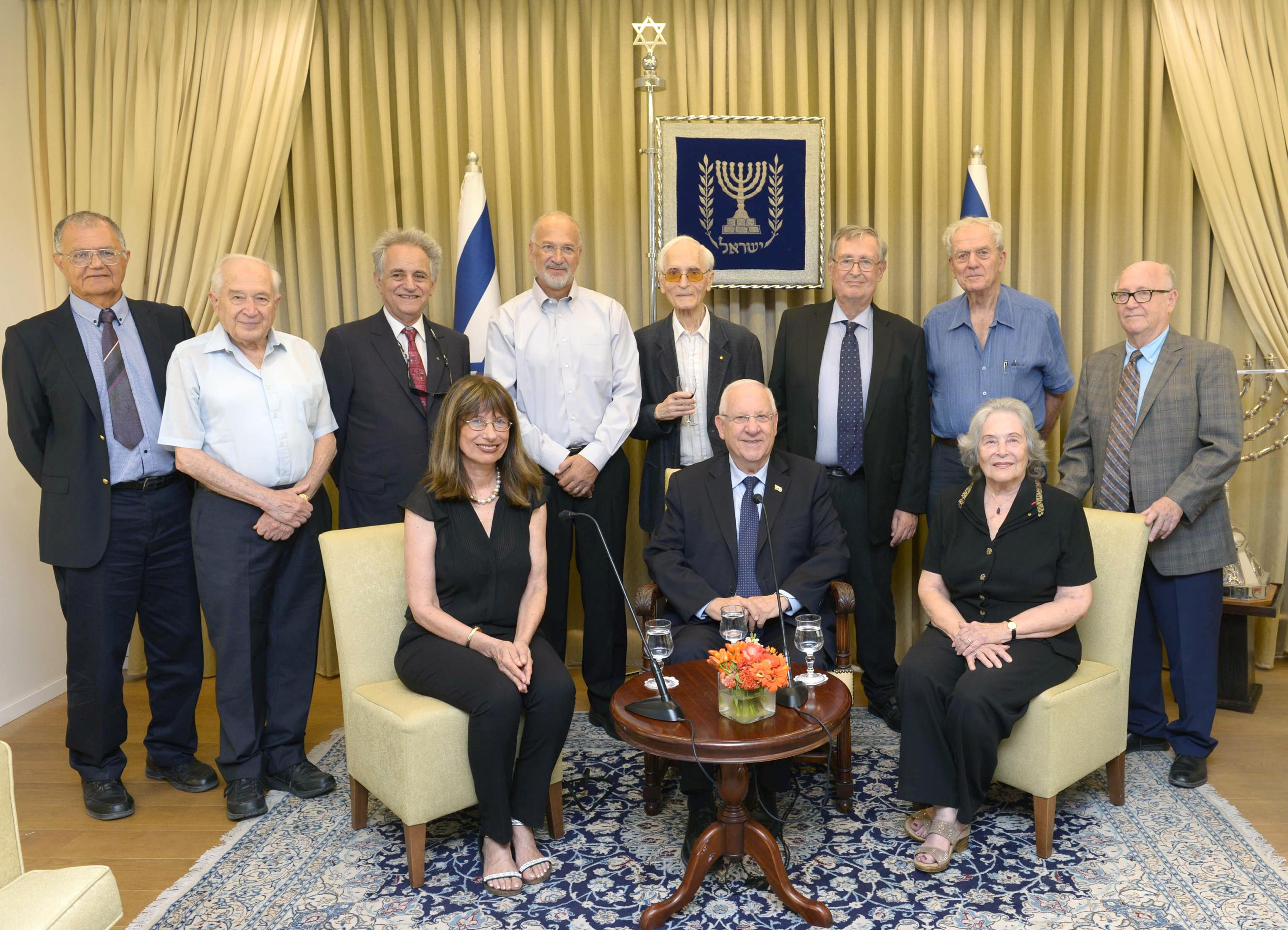
Kedar (standing 3rd from left) with Israeli President Reuven Rivlin along with current and former presidents of the Israel Academy of Sciences and Humanities

=== Activities within the Hebrew University ===
During 1990–96, Kedar was chair of the Research Students Authority (Section of Humanities, Social Sciences, Law) of the Hebrew University of Jerusalem. In 1998–2001, he chaired the university's School of History, which he founded, and where he introduced inter alia a course in world history compulsory for all incoming history students. By teaching this course, Yuval Noah Harari evolved into a leading proponent of Big History. From 2001 to 2005, Kedar was director of the Israel Institute for Advanced Studies.

=== Activities outside the Hebrew University ===
In 1987–92, Kedar chaired of the Standing Committee on Teachers' Colleges of the Council for Higher Education in Israel. During 2001–7, he was chair of the Section of Humanities of the Israel Academy of Sciences and Humanities. During his incumbency he wrote two reports: the first discusses the future of the Humanities in Israel, and the second appraises the historical research in Israeli universities; both were published in 2007. In 2000–12, Kedar chaired the board of the Israel Antiquities Authority. Kedar is a corresponding fellow of the Medieval Academy of America (since 2005), and of the Monumenta Germaniae Historica (since 2006). In 2001, he founded Crusades, Journal of the Society for the Study of the Crusades and the Latin East (SSCLE), and has co-edited it with Jonathan Riley-Smith, and later with Jonathan Phillips. During 1995–2002, he was president of SSCLE, whose quadrennial conferences he convened in 1987 and 1999. In 2007 he was awarded an honorary degree by Haifa University.

In his first book, October 1973: The Story of an Armored Battalion, Kedar describes the battles of the battalion in which he served during the Yom Kippur War as communications NCO. The foreword to this book was written by the then division commander, later Israel's prime minister, Ariel Sharon. Kedar has written numerous opinion articles in Israel's daily newspapers; most of them were collected in a booklet.

In 2010, Kedar was elected vice-president of the Israel Academy of Sciences and Humanities alongside president Ruth Arnon. Their term ended in September 2015.

== Research ==
=== Comparative history ===
Kedar's research spans different periods and cultures, with an emphasis on the European Middle Ages and the crusades. His studies compare different civilizations, utilizing a variety of qualitative and quantitative methods. Thus for example he compared, In his Crusade and Mission: European Approaches toward the Muslims (Princeton University Press, 1984) the attitudes toward the Muslims that took shape in Byzantium and Western Europe as well as among Eastern Christians, and. compared developments along Latin Europe's three fronts with the realm of Islam: Iberia, Sicily and the Frankish Levant. Other comparative studies deal with medieval cartography in Korea, China, the Muslim world, Western Europe as well as in pre-Columbian America; with Muslim, Byzantine and Frankish hospitals; with legislation in the Frankish Kingdom of Jerusalem and in Byzantium; and the comparative dimensions of medieval pilgrimage. Kedar's interest in the theoretical aspects of this sub-discipline led him to study outlines for comparative history set forth from the late 19th century onward.

=== Economic depression and merchant mentality ===
Kedar's first major research, based on his PhD dissertation, was published in 1976 by Yale University Press; an expanded version was translated into Italian. It examines the impact of the 14th century economic depression on the mentality of Genoese and Venetian merchants and reveals that the depression entailed a shrinkage of horizons, a decrease in daring, and a growing quest for security. The idea of insurance arose during this period, the geographical range of activity diminished and, instead of advancing to new regions, commerce was now largely limited to the long-known Mediterranean and Black Seas. Kedar concluded that "the successful exploits in the late 13th century drove some [merchants] to attempt the objectively unfeasible, whereas the setbacks in the mid-14th century made even the objectively feasible seem too hazardous to try." In later years, Kedar made various contributions to the history of Genoa, from drawing attention to a new Arabic source on the Muslim attack on Genoa in 934 to a study of the Genoese notariate in 1382.

=== The study of personal names ===
Kedar is one of the pioneers of the study of medieval personal names. In his first article as well as in the above-mentioned book on the Genoese and Venetian merchants he studied changes in naming fashions through the analysis of long lists of citizens that had been compiled at different dates. He argued that while most medieval people did not leave a direct testimony regarding their mentality, it is possible to approximate it via the names they chose to give their children. That is, the child's personal name serves as an indirect indicator of some facet of the parent's mentality. Consequently, a change in name-giving fashion may be taken as an indication of a shift in group mentality. An article written with his student Muhammad al-Hajjuj, deals with a list of Muslim villagers from the Nablus area, who fled from Frankish rule to Muslim Damascus in the middle of the 12th century. Analysis of this list allowed for the reconstruction of family size and revealed the distribution of personal names. Comparison with the names of children born in the same area in the years 1905–25 revealed a remarkable similarity of the most common names given in the mid-12th to those given in the early 20th century.

=== Crusades ===
A large part of Kedar's studies deals with the crusades and the Frankish Kingdom of Jerusalem, established in the wake of the First Crusade. In these studies he exhibits "an ability to change thinking through a rigorous and imaginative treatment of source-material that has often been ignored by others" and to "peel away unfounded assumptions and unwarranted traditions of historical orthodoxy." Topically, he has discussed the relationship of crusading and conversion; demography; intellectual, ecclesiastical, legal and military history; the relationships of the Frankish rulers with their indigenous subjects; medicine; pilgrimage; eremitism; taxation; topography; mutual perceptions of motivation by Franks and Muslims; and much more. His longitudinal examination of the descriptions of the Jerusalem massacre of July 1099, from eyewitness reports down to the present, "sets new standards for the historiographical analysis of individual events during the crusades." He has also shown that it is possible to establish the age of medieval mortars through radiocarbon datings of the organic components embedded in them. Turning to present-day developments, he analyzed the uses of the Crusader motif in Israeli political discourse, distinguishing between three approaches: a total denial of the possibility of comparison between the Frankish Kingdom and the Zionist enterprise; attempts to draw lessons from the Crusaders' failure; and taking recourse to the Crusaders in order to reinforce a political argument, usually critical of the Israeli establishment.

=== Aerial photographs as a historical source ===
In his book Looking Twice at the Land of Israel: Aerial Photographs of 1917–18 and 1987–91, written in Hebrew and published in 1991, Kedar proposes a new way of looking at the history of the country during the 20th century. Aerial photographs of a given area, taken at different dates, enable to observe the major types of physical change that took place in it over time: processes of construction and destruction, change in land use, continuity and innovation in the road system, and much more. In other words, these aerial photographs constitute a new, "promising historical source – limited in scope, because a view from the air discloses only certain material aspects, but candid and hardly assailable as far as these aspects go. In an age in which the feasibility of an unbiased account has been widely called into question, the photographs may tell a uniquely objective if rudimentary story about a country whose recent past has become so befogged by conflicting, self-righteous and often inflammatory 'narratives'. An early aerial photograph can also reveal ancient remnants that have disappeared in the meantime: for example, an aerial photograph of Merhavia in 1918 clearly shows the outline of the Frankish 12th century castle of La Fève, today covered by houses and lawns.

While the 1991 book juxtaposes aerial photographs from two points in time, the extended and updated English version, The Changing Land between the Jordan and the Sea, published in 1999, allows to compare aerial photographs of the same area taken at four points in time: 1917–18, around 1948, around 1967 and in the 1990s.

Examination of the 1917–18 photographs allowed Kedar also to reassess the crucial Battle of Beersheba on 31 October 1917, as well as other developments on the Palestine front during World War I.

=== Explication of a 7th-century apocalypse ===
A further example for the use of a variety of research methods is the explication of a statement in a 7th-century Syriac apocalypse on the impact of the Arab conquests on trees and vegetation. Utilizing palynological studies and satellite imagery Kedar reaches the conclusion that the statement in the apocalypse was rooted in reality.

=== World history ===
In his earliest contribution to this subfield, Kedar analyzed the phenomenon of expulsion throughout history, and reached the conclusion that systematic corporate expulsion by governmental decree constitutes a characteristic of Western European civilization, where it recurred from the 12th century onward. He identified a persistent pattern: the ruler decides that a group is dangerous to society; he orders to remove its members beyond the borders; usually these members are given three months to liquidate their affairs. While expulsion aimed most frequently at Jews, other groups – Lombards and Cahorsins, Moriscos, Protestants, Jesuits and Mormons—were also expelled between the 13th and 19th centuries. With the expansion of European civilization to other continents, the practice struck roots there as well, with Idi Amin's expulsion of Asians from Uganda in 1972 being a recent example.

Other world historical studies dealt with the role of surviving elites in ensuring various degrees of cultural persistence in the wake of, or despite, the collapse of a state or a regime, and with the role of harbor and river chains in world history from Antiquity onward. More recently he co-edited, with Merry Wiesner-Hanks, the volume of The Cambridge World History that deals with the "Middle Millennium", i.e., the period 500–1500 CE. In his introduction to this volume, he contrasted the growing knowledge about the world's appearance attested by maps on the one hand, with the largely civilization-centric works of history on the other hand, and outlined the sporadic and regular trans-civilizational relations of that age.

=== Regional history ===
In his "History of the Modi`in Region," published in 2014, Kedar dealt with the past of a specific region from Neolithic times onward, treating equitably all periods. The region in question is the one in which the new Israeli town of Modi`in was erected in the 1990s. Contrary to many Israeli accounts that focus almost exclusively on the Jewish periods in the country's history, Kedar dwells on all periods even-handedly and presents a wealth of data on the Arab villages that existed in the region until 1948, some of which were already mentioned in Latin charters of the Frankish Kingdom of Jerusalem.

=== Some discoveries ===
Kedar discovered a number of unknown texts from the period of the Crusades. Among these are a series of Latin-written biographies of hermits who lived in the Frankish Kingdom of Jerusalem in the 12th century, and a series of Arabic-written stories about Muslim holy men who lived under Frankish rule in the area of Nablus; he entrusted the publication of the latter series to his student Daniella Talmon-Heller. He also deciphered a detailed description of everyday routine in the Jerusalem Hospital, written apparently around 1180, and published an unknown letter in which Eraclius, the last Latin Patriarch to reside in Jerusalem, called for help from the West as Saladin's armies were approaching the city in 1187. Kedar discovered also the original text of Chaim Weizmann's address at the laying of the foundation stones of the Hebrew University in July 1918, as well as suppressed passages of Weizmann's autobiography.

=== A Bavarian historian reinvents himself ===
In 2011, Kedar published, with Peter Herde of Würzburg University, a book that revealed that Karl Bosl, one of Bavaria's most prominent historians in the post-1945 era, had manifold links with the Nazi regime and as late as December 1944 extolled the struggle for the preservation of Hitler's Reich. Yet immediately after the war he asserted that he had risked his life in activities against the Nazi regime, and succeeded in persuading a Denazification Tribunal that this had been the case. The book is based on a large number of unpublished official and private documents. Ian Kershaw appraised it as "an excellent piece of detective work."

In the wake of the book's publication, the municipality of Cham, the town in which Bosl was born, decided to rename the square called after him.

=== Scholarly initiatives ===
In 1977 Kedar proposed to Professor Horst Fuhrmann, the then-president of the Monumenta Germaniae Historica, to launch a series of critically edited Hebrew texts written in the German lands in medieval times. In 2001, when Kedar chaired the Humanities Section of the Israel Academy of Sciences and Humanities, the Academy and the MGH signed a formal agreement to publish the series Hebräische Texte aus dem mittelalterlichen Deutschland; the first volume appeared in 2005, and the second in 2016.

In 2009, Kedar and Oleg Grabar (of the Princeton Institute for Advanced Study) edited a book on the past and the present of Jerusalem's Temple Mount / al-Haram al-Sharif, whose possession has become of the thorniest issues impeding an Israeli-Palestinian rapprochement. The initiative was unprecedented, inasmuch as it succeeded in securing the sponsorship of an Israeli, a Palestinian and a Dominican institute of higher learning, all located in Jerusalem; the authors of the book's chapters were Israeli, Palestinian, European and American scholars.

=== Recent research ===
In 2025, his book "Cultures of the Medieval Kingdom of Jerusalem: Frontier Inventiveness in the Age of the Crusades", published by Cornell University Press. The book was selected as one of the two best books published in the field of Crusade studies between 2022 and 2026 by the Society for the Study of the Crusades and the Latin East (SSCLE).

== Books ==
1. October 1973: The Story of an Armored Battalion. Tammuz: Tel Aviv, 1975. 143 pp. (in Hebrew).
2. Merchants in Crisis: Genoese and Venetian Men of Affairs and the Fourteenth-Century Depression. Yale University Press: New Haven and London, 1976. 260 pp.
3. Ed.: Jerusalem in the Middle Ages. Selected Papers. Yad Ben Zvi: Jerusalem, 1979. 400 pp. (in Hebrew).
4. Mercanti in crisi a Genova e Venezia nel '300. Jouvence: Rome, 1981. 353 pp. (Updated Italian translation of No. 2).
5. Ed., with H.E. Mayer & R.C. Smail: Outremer. Studies in the History of the Crusading Kingdom of Jerusalem presented to Joshua Prawer. Yad Ben Zvi: Jerusalem, 1982. 346 pp.
6. Crusade and Mission: European Approaches toward the Muslims. Princeton University Press: Princeton, 1984. 246 pp. Paperback edition 1988. New printing 2014.
7. Ed., with Gabriella Airaldi: I comuni italiani nel Regno Crociato di Gerusalemme. Atti del colloquio di Gerusalemme, 24-28 maggio 1984. Collana storica di fonti e studi diretta da Geo Pistarino, 48. Genoa, 1986. 695 pp.
8. Ed.: E. Ashtor, East-West Trade in the Medieval Mediterranean. Variorum Collected Studies: London, 1986. 344 pp.
9. Ed.: The Crusaders in their Kingdom, 1099–1291. Yad Ben Zvi: Jerusalem, 1987. 283 pp. (in Hebrew).
10. Ed., with A.L. Udovitch: The Medieval Levant. Studies in Memory of Eliyahu Ashtor (1914–1984) = Asian and African Studies 22 (1988), 1–291.
11. Ed., with Trude Dothan and S. Safrai: Commerce in Palestine throughout the Ages. Yad Ben Zvi: Jerusalem, 1990. 337 pp. (in Hebrew).
12. Crociata e missione. Europa incontro all'Islam. Jouvence: Rome, 1991. 302 pp. (Italian translation of No. 6).
13. Looking Twice at the Land of Israel. Aerial Photographs of 1917–1918 and 1987–91. Yad Ben Zvi and Israel Ministry of Defense: Jerusalem and Tel Aviv, 1991. 239 pp. (in Hebrew).
14. Ed.: E. Ashtor, Technology, Industry and Trade. The Levant versus Europe, 1250–1500. Variorum: London, 1992. 331 pp.
15. Ed.: The Horns of Hattin. Proceedings of the Second Conference of the Society for the Study of the Crusades, Jerusalem and Haifa, 2–6 July 1987. Yad Ben Zvi and Variorum: Jerusalem and Aldershot, 1992. 368 pp.
16. The Franks in the Levant, 11th to 14th Centuries. Variorum: Aldershot, 1993. 322 pp.
17. Ed.: Studies in the History of Popular Culture. Shazar Center for Jewish History: Jerusalem, 1996. 444 pp. (in Hebrew).
18. Ed., with M. Maoz: The Palestinian National Movement: From Confrontation to Reconciliation? Israel Ministry of Defense: Tel Aviv, 1996. 423 pp. (in Hebrew).
19. Ed., with J. Riley-Smith and R. Hiestand: Montjoie: Studies in Crusade History in Honour of Hans Eberhard Mayer. Variorum: Aldershot, 1997. xx + 276 pp.
20. Ed., with R.J.Z. Werblowsky: Sacred Space: Shrine, City, Land. Studies in Memory of Joshua Prawer. Israel Academy of Sciences and Humanities, and Macmillan: Jerusalem and London, 1998. 348 pp.
21. The Changing Land between the Jordan and the Sea: Aerial photographs from 1917 to the Present. Jerusalem and Tel Aviv: Yad Ben-Zvi and Israel Ministry of Defense. 208 pp. (Revised English version of No. 13). 1999. ISBN 978-965-05-0975-0.
22. Ed., with A. Danin: Remote Sensing: The Use of Aerial Photographs and Satellite Images in Israel Studies. Yad Ben-Zvi: Jerusalem 2000. 260 pp. (in Hebrew).
23. Ed., with M. Balard and J. Riley-Smith: Dei gesta per Francos. Etudes sur les croisades dédiées à Jean Richard. Ashgate: Aldershot, 2001. 434 pp.
24. Ed., Crusades 1 (2002), 2 (2003), 3 (2004), 4 (2005), 5 (2006), 6 (2007), 7 (2008), 8 (2009), 9 (2010), 10 (2011), 11 (2012), 12 (2013), 13 (2014), 14 (2015), 15 (2016).
25. Holy Men in a Holy Land: Christian, Muslim and Jewish Religiosity in the Near East at the Time of the Crusades. Hayes Robinson Lecture Series, 9. Royal Holloway, University of London, 2005. 24 pp.
26. Ed., with A. Kadish, The Few Against The Many? Studies on the Balance of Forces in the Battles of Judas Maccabaeus and Israel's War of Independence. Jerusalem, 2005. 227 pp. [in Hebrew].
27. Apocrypha: Writings on Current Affairs, 1954–2004. Modi`in, 2006. 228 pp. (in Hebrew, English and German).
28. Ed., with Nicolas Faucherre and Jean Mesqui, L'architecture en Terre sainte au temps de Saint Louis = Bulletin Monumental 146 (2006), 3–120.
29. Franks, Muslims and Oriental Christians in the Latin Levant: Studies in Frontier Acculturation. Aldershot: Ashgate Publishing 2006. 228 pp.
30. Historical Research in Israel's Universities. Israel Academy of Sciences and Humanities: Jerusalem, 2007.
31. Ed., with Oleg Grabar, Where Heaven and Earth Meet: Jerusalem's Sacred Esplanade. Jerusalem and Austin, Texas, 2009. 411 pp.
32. Ed., Explorations in Comparative History. Jerusalem, 2009. 242 pp.
33. Ed., with Joseph R. Hacker and Yosef Kaplan, From Sages to Savants. Studies Presented to Avraham Grossman. Jerusalem, 2009. 455 pp. [in Hebrew].
34. (with Peter Herde) A Bavarian Historian Reinvents Himself: Karl Bosl and the Third Reich. Jerusalem, 2011. 162 pp.
35. Rival Conceptualizations of a Single Space: Jerusalem's Sacred Esplanade. Nehru Memorial and Museum Library, Occasional Papers, NS 62. New Delhi, 2014. 27 pp.
36. Ed., with Merry Wiesner-Han, The Cambridge World History, vol. 5: Expanding Webs of Exchange and Conflict, 500 CE – 1500 CE. Cambridge University Press, 2015. 722 pp. second edition in paperback, 2017.
37. Ed., Chaim Weizmann: Scientist, Statesman and Architect of Science Policy. Jerusalem, 2015. 285 pp. [in Hebrew].
38. Benjamin Z. Kedar & Peter Herde, Karl Bosl im Dritten Reich. Walter de Gruyter, Berlin-Boston & Hebrew University Magnes Press, Jerusalem. 2016. 226 pp.
39. Crusaders and Franks. Studies in the History of the Crusades and the Frankish Levant. Abingdon, UK: Routledge, 2016. Xii +354 pp.
40. Benjamin Z. Kedar, Ilana Friedrich Silber and Adam Klin-Oron, eds., Dynamics of Continuity, Patterns of Change: Between World History and Comparative Historical Sociology. In Memory of Shmuel Noah Eisenstadt (Jerusalem, Israel Academy of Sciences and Humanities and Van Leer Jerusalem Institute, 2017), 290 pp.
41. Iris Shagrir, Benjamin Z. Kedar and Michel Balard (ed.), Communicating The Middle Ages: Essays in Honour of Sophia Menache, Crusades - Subsidia 11, Routledge, 2018, 309 pp.
42. Studies in World, Jewish and Local History, Bialik Institute, 2018, Jerusalem, 582 pp. [in Hebrew].
43. Communicating the Middle Ages. Essays in Honour of Sophia Menache, ed. Iris Shagrir, Benjamin Z. Kedar and Michel Balard. Routledge: London and New York, 2018. 278 pp.
44. Crusading and Trading between East and West. Studies in Honour of David Jacoby, ed. Sophia Menache, Benjamin Z. Kedar and Michel Balard. Routledge: London and New York, 2019. 368 pp.
45. BZ Kedar, With Nurith. A Historian Investigates the Love Story of His Life. 490 pp.
46. From Genoa to Jerusalem and Beyond. Studies in Medieval and World History. Padua: Libreria Universitaria, 2019. 573 pp.
47. The Frankish Kingdoms of Jerusalem (1099-1187) and Acre (1191-1291). Jerusalem: Bialik Institute, 2025. 389 pp. [in Hebrew].
48. Cultures of the Medieval Kingdom of Jerusalem: Frontier Inventiveness in the Age of the Crusades. Ithaca and London: Cornell University Press, 2025. 551 pp.
