= Robert Limpert =

German resistance fighter

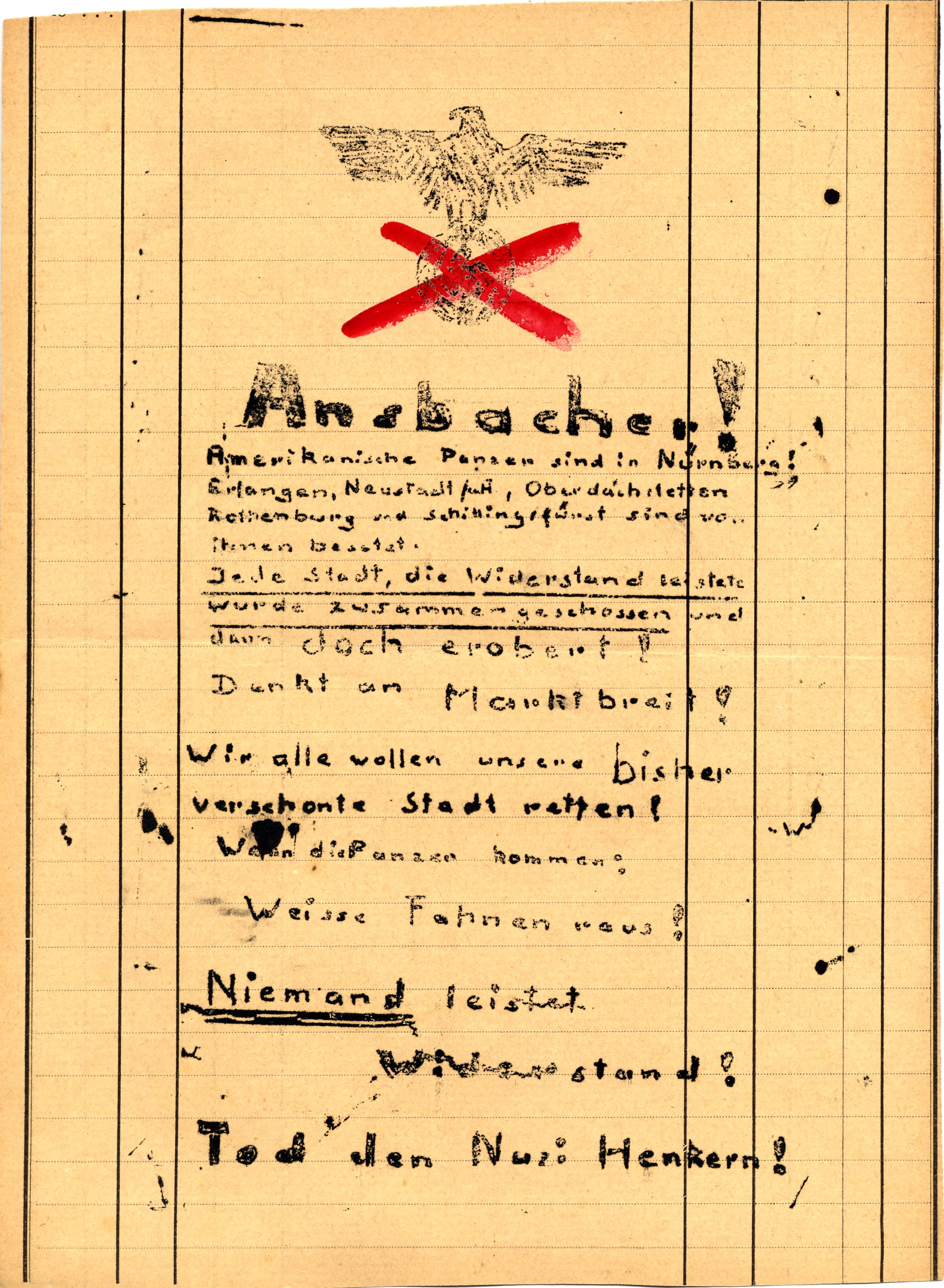
One of Limpert's anti-Nazi flyers

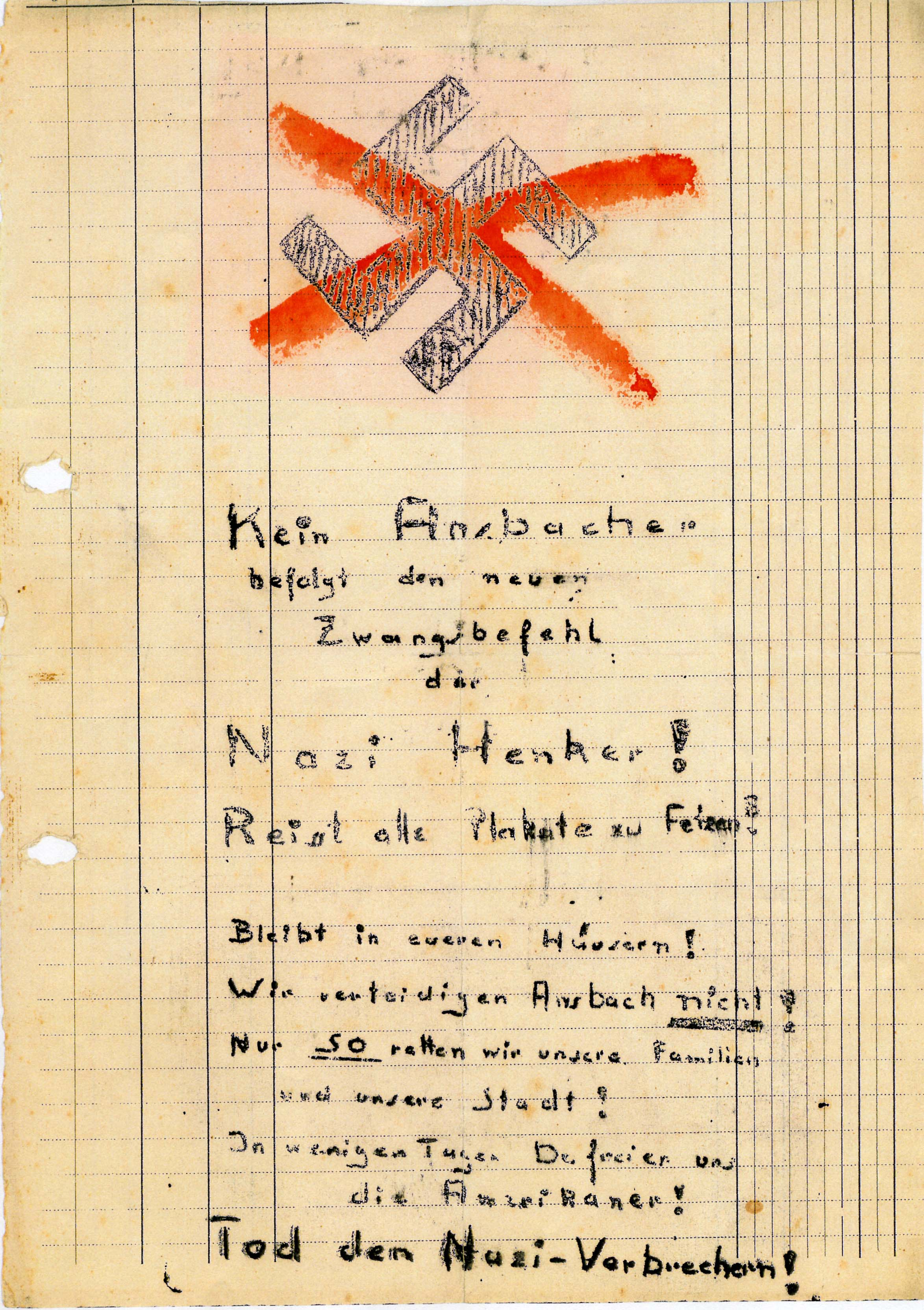
One of Limpert's anti-Nazi flyers

Robert Limpert (15 July 1925 – 18 April 1945) was a German resistance fighter against the Nazi government in World War II. He was executed in the final days of the war for cutting the telephone lines at an abandoned Wehrmacht command post in Ansbach in Germany.

== Life ==
Limpert was a native of Ansbach. There, he attended elementary school for four years then transferred to the Gymnasium Carolinum. Limpert developed a severe heart condition in early childhood.

In 1943, Robert Limpert and a friend Wolfgang Hammer were accused of damaging blackout curtains during night watch at the high school and to have written slogans critical of the Nazi regime. This led to their being expelled. After completing schooling he was drafted into military service in March 1945. A heart attack eight days later led to his dismissal and his return to Ansbach.

== Actions ==
In the days before 18 April 1945, Limpert and his comrades in a Nazi resistance cell posted flyers on the Ansbach Rathaus (city hall) in an attempt to incite local residents to sabotage the defense of the town and have it surrender to the Allies. The deputy mayor agreed, but he was overridden by Colonel Ernst Meyer.

On the 18th, with allied forces approaching Ansbach, Limpert was observed by two members of the Hitler Youth cutting telephone lines between the recently abandoned commander's headquarters and troops stationed outside the city. The lines had not been connected. Limpert was arrested but escaped. He was captured again, Meyer sentenced Limpert to death, and he was hanged hours before the US Army captured the city. Meyer had placed the noose himself, and on the first attempt to hang Limpert the rope broke.

After the end of the war, Colonel Ernst Meyer was sentenced to 10 years in prison for manslaughter, of which he served six years. According to his daughter, Ute Althaus, he never regretted his actions.

== Legacy ==
Three days after his execution Limpert was buried where he was eulogized by his former teacher, Karl Bosl. This was the start of Bosl's efforts to erase his past as a Nazi.

== Gallery ==
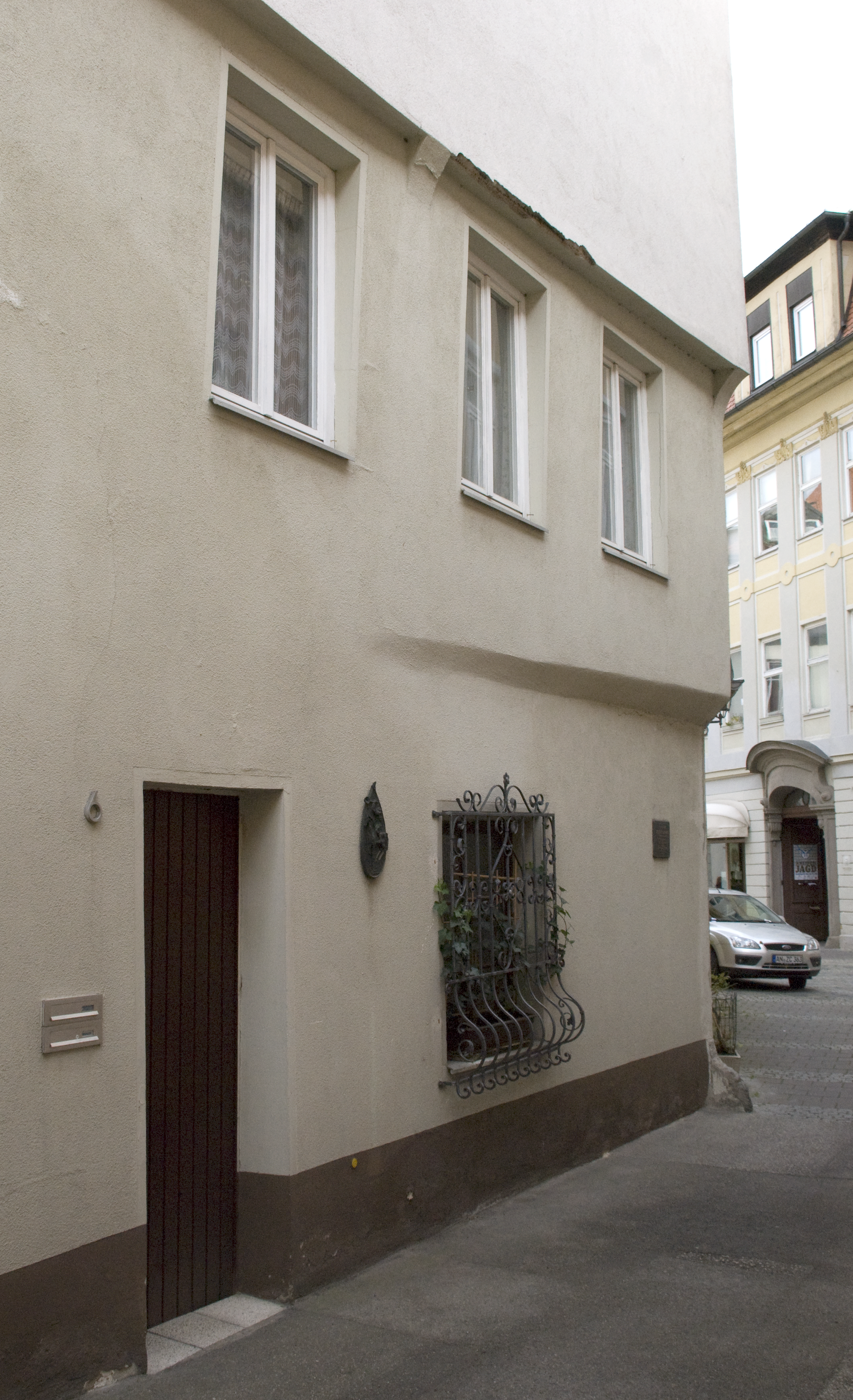
Birthplace at 6 Kronenstrasse

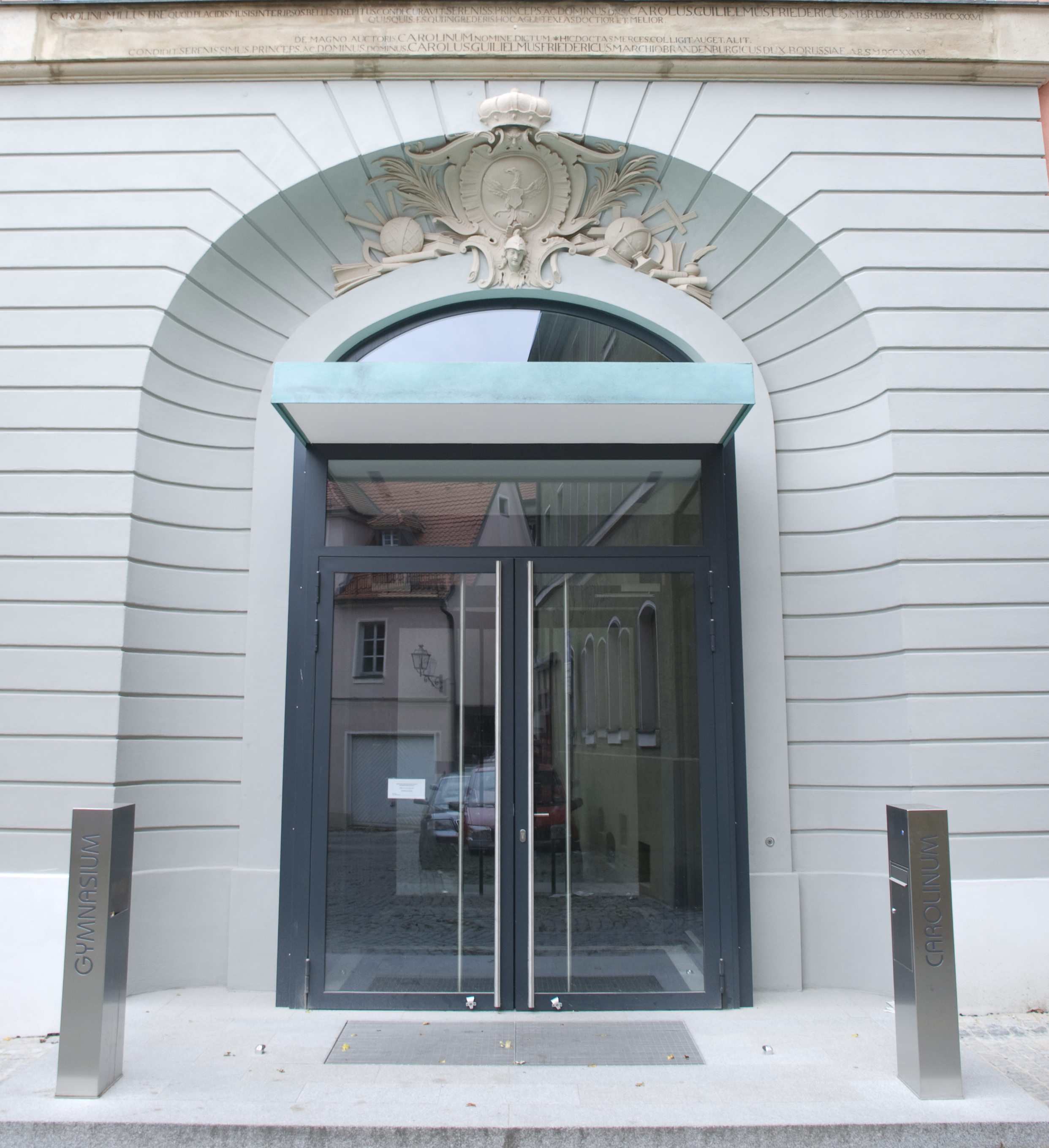
Main door of Gymnasium Carolinum

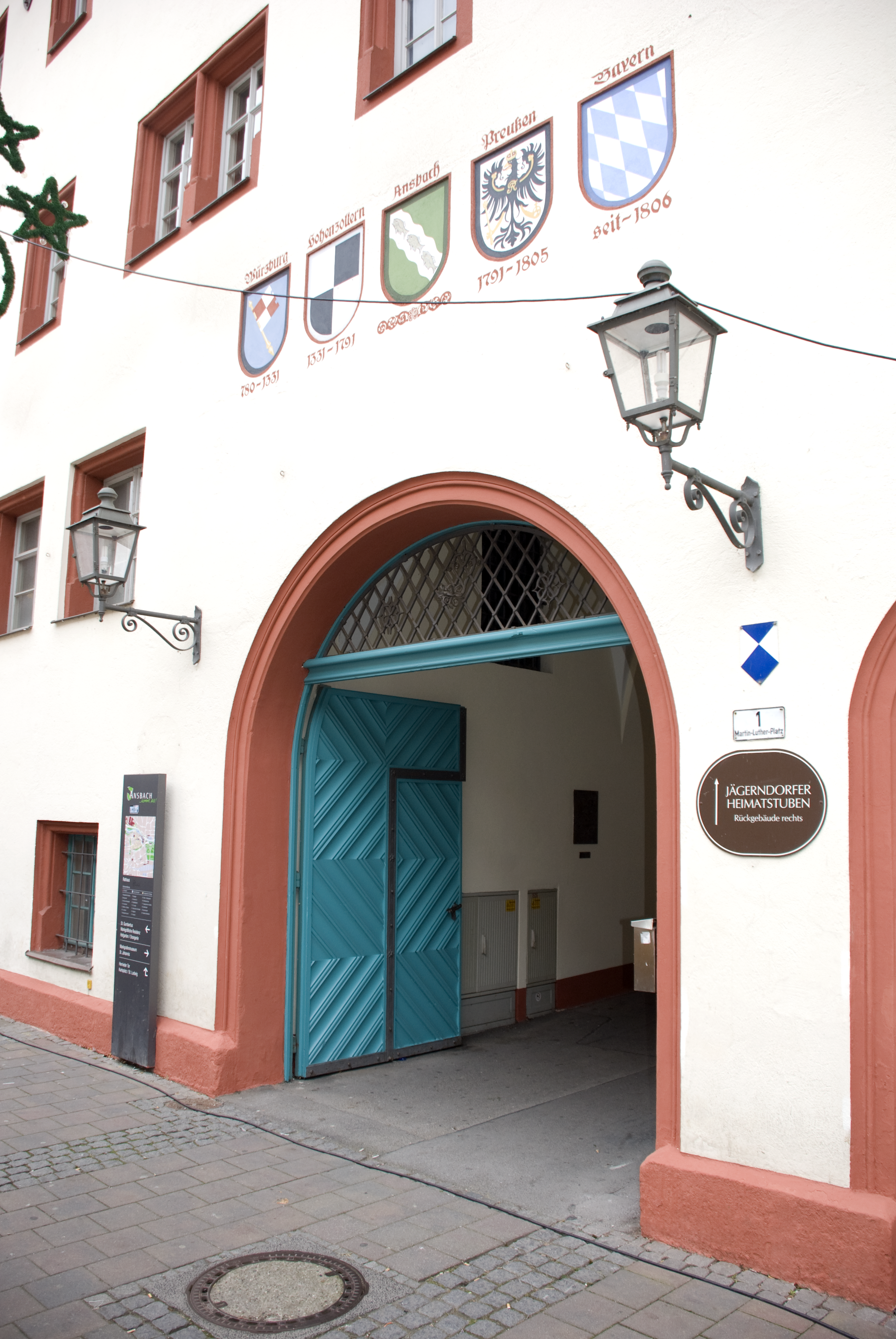
Rathaus

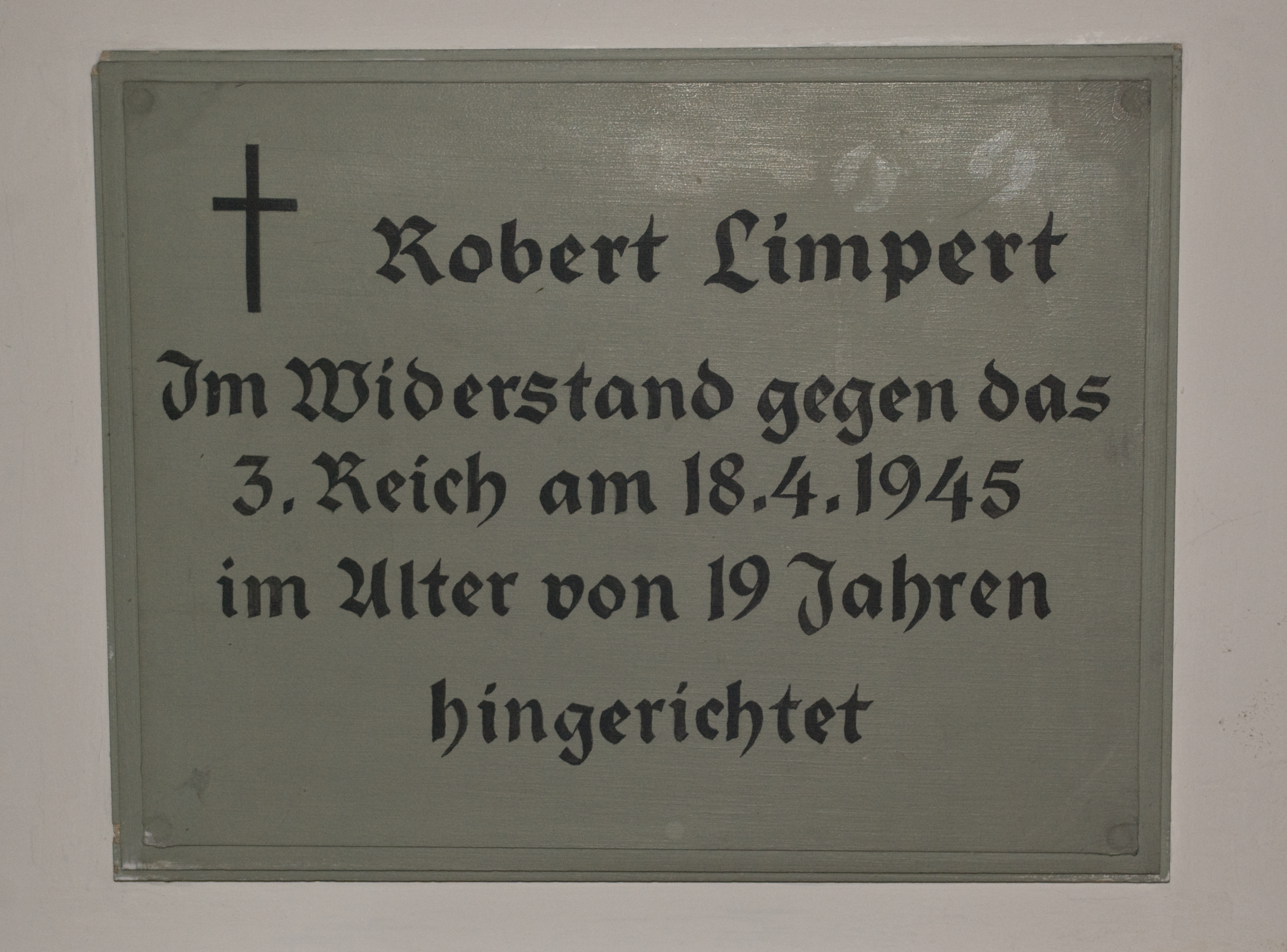
Plaque at Church of St. Ludwig

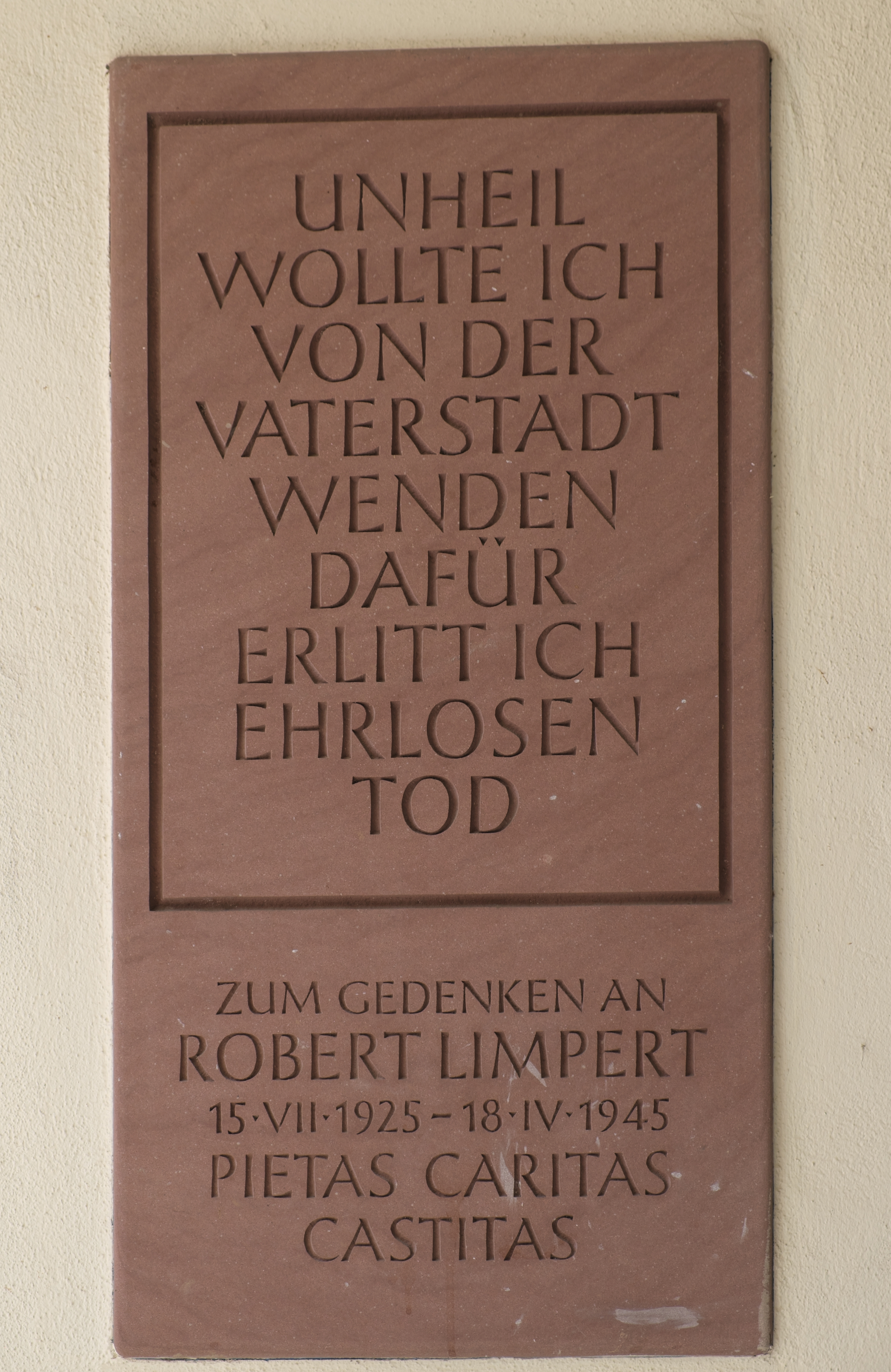
Plaque commemorating Limpert on the Ansbach Rathaus

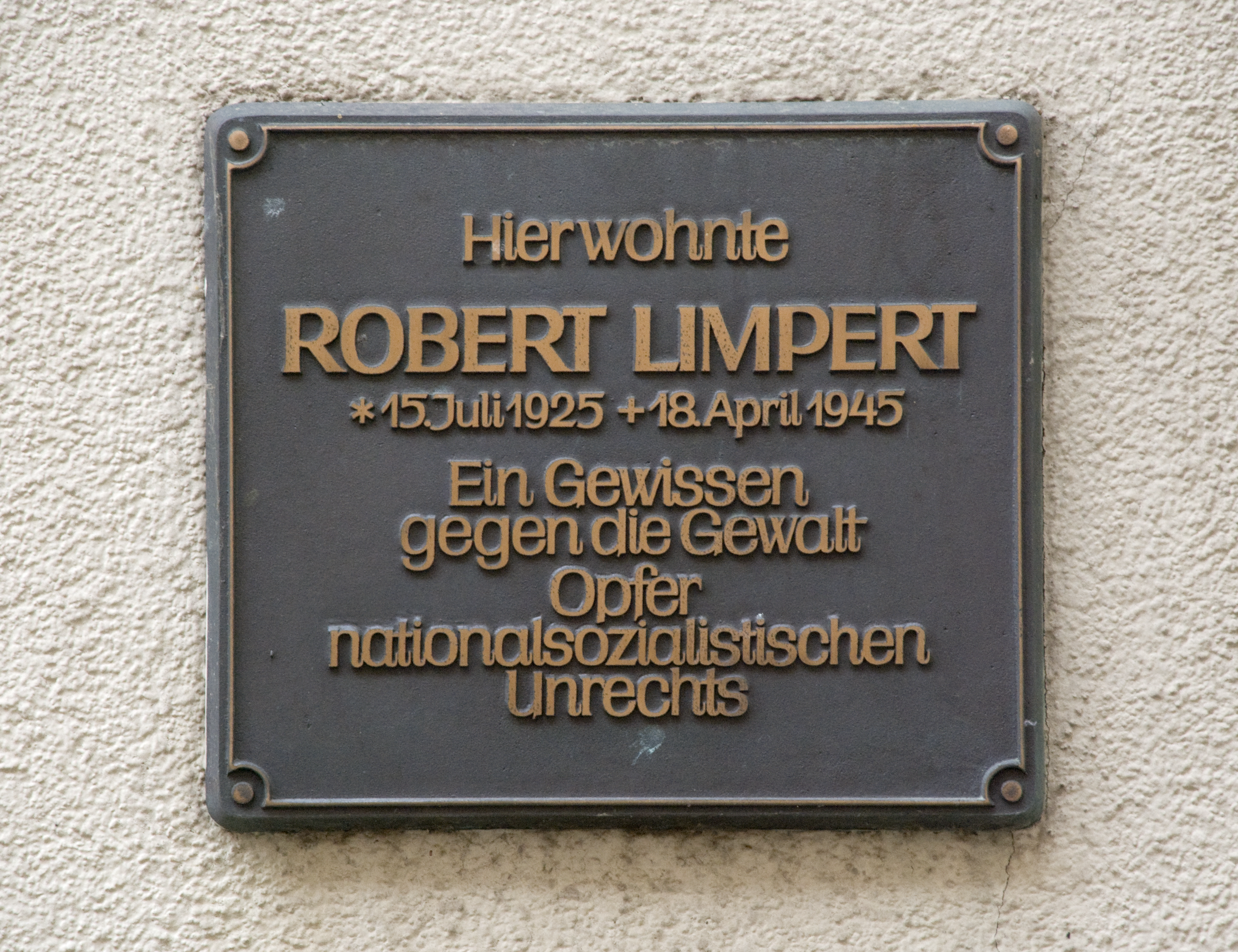
Official plaque at birthplace

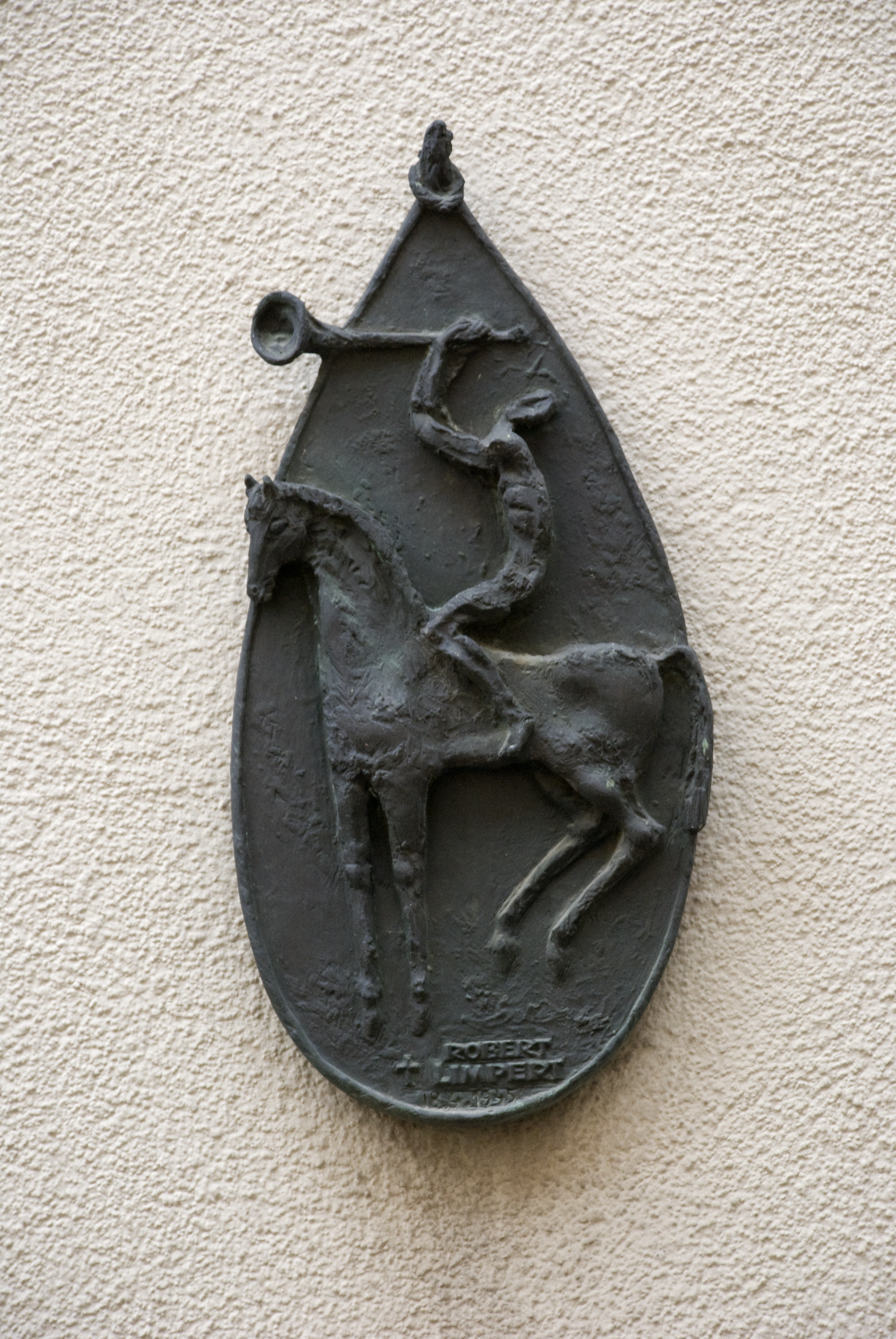
Private memorial at birthplace

== Bibliography ==
- Adelheid L. Rüter-Ehlermann; C. F. Rüter (1968). Justiz und NS-Verbrechen:Sammlung deutscher Strafurteile wegen nationalsozialistischer Tötungsverbrechen 1945–1966. Vol. 1. Amsterdam: University Press. pp. 113–129.
  District Court of Ansbach, 14 December 1946: "Erhängung eines Studenten, der in Flugblättern sowie gegenüber dem Bürgermeister von Ansbach zur kampflosen Übergabe der Stadt aufgefordert und Sabotage an einem Nachrichtenkabel verübt hatte, das zwischen dem Gefechtsstand des Kampfkommandanten und der kämpfenden Truppe verlief"
- Fröhlich, Elke; Broszat, Martin (1983). Bayern in der NS-Zeit. Die Herausforderung des Einzelnen. Geschichten über Widerstand und Verfolgung. Vol. VI. Oldenbourg, München: Oldenbourg Wissenschaftsverlag. ISBN 3-486-42411-4.
- Puvogel, Ulrike; Stankowski, Martin (1996). Gedenkstätten für die Opfer des Nationalsozialismus. Vol. 1. Bonn: Bundeszentrale für politische Bildung. ISBN 3-89331-208-0.
- Fritz, Diana (2002). Ansbach unterm Hakenkreuz. Ansbach. ISBN 3-932884-09-4.
- Althaus, Ute (2006). "NS-Offizier war ich nicht." Die Tochter forscht nach. Gießen: Psychosozial-Verlag. ISBN 3-89806-504-9.
- Wairer, Frank (21 January 2007). "Die Tochter forscht nach". Sonntagsblatt Bayern.
- Kedar, Benjamin Z.; Herde, Peter (2011). A Bavarian Historian Reinvents Himself: Karl Bosl & the Third Reich. Magnes Press.
- Helmut Moll (2019). Zeugen für Christus. Das deutsche Martyrologium des 20. Jahrhunderts. Vol. I. Paderborn: der Deutschen Bischofskonferenz. pp. 108–112. ISBN 978-3-506-78012-6.
