= Walter Schlesinger =

German historian (1908–1984)

Walter Schlesinger (April 28, 1908, Glauchau – June 10, 1984, Weimar-Wolfshausen, near Marburg) was a German historian of medieval social and economic institutions, particularly in the context of German regional history ("Landesgeschichte"). Schlesinger is widely recognized as one of the most influential and prolific scholars of medieval social history in the post-war period.

== Education and career ==
Schlesinger received his doctorate at the University of Leipzig under Rudolf Kötzschke in 1935 and completed his second post-graduate thesis (Habilitation) under the renowned medieval historian Hermann Heimpel in 1940. Following service in the Wehrmacht and after recovering from serious injuries received during the war, Schlesinger briefly taught at the University of Leipzig, but was made to resign in 1945 due to his membership of the Nazi Party. After working for several years as an independent scholar, he was rehabilitated and taught in several West German universities, including Berlin and Frankfurt (Main). In 1964, he was awarded the chair in medieval history at the University of Marburg, where he remained until his death in 1984.

== Military service ==
Like many academics of his generation, the young Schlesinger was an ardent nationalist and became a member of the Nazi Party as early as 1929. Both his teachers, Kötzschke and Heimpel, held similar views. By the mid-1930s, however, Schlesinger found himself increasingly at odds with the Party's ideology. His decision to write his Habilitation in medieval history under Heimpel came after a bitter falling out with Kötzschke's successor as professor of Landesgeschichte, the ardent Nazi historian and racial theorist Adolf Helbok. Though disillusioned with the Nazi regime, Schlesinger nonetheless joined the Wehrmacht in 1940 and was assigned a staff job that allowed him to continue his research and writing. However, when a letter he had written to his wife containing his candid views of the government and the war was intercepted by censors, he was punished by being assigned to a high-risk battalion fighting anti-Nazi forces in the Balkans.

== Scholarship ==
Schlesinger was an active and prolific scholar who contributed to many fields of medieval history. His Habilitationschrift was published as Die Entstehung der Landesherrschaft (The Origins of Regional Lordship) in 1941 and became one of the most influential works on German social history in the post-war period. Entstehung dealt with the rise of the regional nobility in central Germany following the collapse of the Carolingian Empire. Schlesinger challenged earlier understandings about the foundations of comital (count's) power in the early Middle Ages, which had focused narrowly on office-holding and legal jurisdictions. Great regional lords in German lands, argued Schlesinger, did not come to power by assuming and privatising the privileges of public offices—such as that of the duke or count—they had held under the Frankish monarchy, but drew power from their own private family lands and the customary legal authority they exercised as leaders of a band of vassals and subjects in a manner reminiscent of the ancient Germanic warrior-chieftain. This thesis stood in sharp contrast to that being promoted by another rising young scholar, Gerd Tellenbach, who believed that the nobility of France and Germany owed their origins to Frankish aristocrats placed in high positions over regions conquered by the Carolingians in the eighth and ninth centuries.

Schlesinger argued in his work for the enduring influence of old Germanic attitudes about loyalty and leadership that produced a unique social structure and forms of political organization in German lands. This ethno-cultural view of the history and formation of legal and political institutions was strongly represented among a number of nationalistically oriented German and Austrian medievalists of Schlesinger's generation, including Karl Bosl, Theodor Mayer, and Otto Brunner. Schlesinger's theories about Germanic ethnicity and its influence on law and authority in medieval society were later critiqued by scholars like the Czech medievalist Frantisek Graus and the legal historian Karl Kroeschell.

Schlesinger himself effectively attacked certain prevailing historical ideas as well. In a famous lecture delivered in 1963, Schlesinger sharply criticized the politically charged field of Ostforschung ("East[European] Studies"), which had for a long time, but particularly during the Third Reich, served as a thinly veiled effort to lend scientific credibility to anti-Slavic prejudice and German domination of Poland and other parts of eastern Europe. Schlesinger insisted that the traditional paradigm of Ostforschung had been discredited and should be replaced by a broader, more interdisciplinary and historically rigorous study of East-Central Europe on its own terms, not as a tool of German politics. Accordingly, Schlesinger wrote extensively on settlement along the German-Slavic frontiers in the Middle Ages, as well as on the development of bishoprics and towns in the Saxon and Slavic areas of eastern Germany, paying particular attention to local and regional contexts for economic and demographic change. He made seminal contributions early on as well to the important Repertorium der Deutschen Königspfalzen project, which assembled detailed archaeological and historical studies of the sites which had served as royal estates or waystations on the tours of the medieval German kings.

== Selected works ==
- Die Entstehung der Landesherrschaft. Untersuchungen vorwiegend nach mitteldeutschen Quellen (1941)
- Kirchengeschichte Sachsens im Mittelalter (Cologne & Graz, 1962)
- Beiträge zur deutschen Verfassungsgeschichte des Mittelalters, 2 vols. (1963)
- "Randbemerkungen zu drei Aufsätzen über Sippe, Gefolgschaft und Treue," in: Alteuropa und die moderne Gesellschaft, Festschrift für Otto Brunner (Göttingen, 1963), pp. 11–59.
- (as editor) Die deutsche Ostsiedlung des Mittelalters als Problem der europäischen Geschichte, Vorträge und Forschungen 18 (Sigmaringen 1975).
- "Zur Geschichte der Magdeburger Königspfalz," in: Walter Schlesinger: Ausgewählte Aufsätze, Vorträge und Forschungen 34 (Sigmaringen 1987), pp. 315–346.
