= Eliyahu Ashtor =

Austrian-Israeli historian (1914–1984)

Eliyahu Ashtor (Hebrew: אליהו אשתור; born Eduard Strauss 1914–1984) was an Austrian Jewish-Israeli historian. He was from a Zionist family. Studying at Vienna University, he completed a doctorate in Oriental studies in 1936. He emigrated to Mandate Palestine in 1938, following the Anschluss to Nazi Germany, and worked in the National Library of the Hebrew University of Jerusalem. Completing another doctorate at Jerusalem University in 1944, he at first specialized on the history of the Golden age of Jewish culture in Spain but soon moved to the medieval history of the Near East, and especially social and economic history medieval Egypt, drawing from the manuscripts of the Cairo Geniza. He was professor at the University of Jerusalem from 1969.

== Works ==
- 1944–1970, History of the Jews in Egypt and Syria under Mamluk rule (in Hebrew), Mossad Harav Kook, three volumes (1944, 1951, 1970)
- 1974, The Jews in Moslem Spain I, Philadelphia, Jewish Publication Society of America.
- 1976, A Social and Economic History of the Near East in the Middle Ages, Londra, W. Collins & Co. Ltd.
- 1978, Studies on the Levantine Trade in the Middle Ages
- 1983, The Jews and the Mediterranean Economy, 10th-15th centuries
- 1983, Levant Trade in the Middle Ages, Princeton University Press (a major book)
- 1986, East-West Trade in the Medieval Mediterranean, Variorum Reprints
- 1992, ed. B. Z. Ḳedar, Technology, industry, and trade: The Levant versus Europe, 1250–1500 (collection of articles)
