= Rudolf Kötzschke =

German historian

Rudolf Kötzschke (8 July 1867 – 3 August 1949) was a German historian who founded the Seminar for Regional History and Settlement Studies in Leipzig, the first regional history institution at a German university.

== Life and career ==
Born in Dresden, Kötzschke was the son of the "royal Saxon chamber musician" Hermann Kötzschke and older brother of the historian Paul Richard Kötzschke (1869–1945). He attended Gelinek's public school and from 1877 to 1885 the Kreuzschule in Dresden. From 1886 to 1889, he studied at the University of Leipzig, majoring in Latin and history and minoring in German, geography, Sanskrit and Ancient Greek; in the summer of 1887, he studied for a semester at the University of Tübingen. In Leipzig, he became a member of the Leipziger Universitäts-Sängerschaft zu St. Pauli in Mainz (now in the Deutsche Sängerschaft). In 1889, he was awarded a doctorate in Leipzig with a thesis on Ruprecht von der Pfalz und das Konzil zu Pisa, the following year he passed the Staatsexamen. Subsequently, Kötzschke initially worked as a teacher at a Dresden and a Leipzig grammar school until the historian Karl Lamprecht brought him to Leipzig in 1894. In 1896, Kötzschke became an assistant at the Königlich Sächsischen Kommission für Geschichte.

In 1899, Kötzschke habilitated in Leipzig for "middle and modern history, in particular for Saxon regional history", the subject of the habilitation was Studien zu Verwaltungsgeschichte der Grundherrschaft Werden. Besides Lamprecht, Erich Marcks and Gerhard Seeliger were reviewers. After his Habilitation, Kötzschke first became a private lecturer in Leipzig and in 1906 Extraordinarius. In 1906, he was also appointed director of the Institute for Regional History and Settlement Studies, a position he held until 1936. From 1930, he held a chair of Saxon history. During the Nazi era, he became a member of the National Socialist People's Welfare, the Reichsluftschutzbund and the Reichskolonialbund. However, he did not join the National Socialist German Workers' Party. He described the Machtergreifung by the Nazis as a landmark in German history. In November 1933 he signed the Vow of allegiance of the Professors of the German Universities and High-Schools to Adolf Hitler and the National Socialistic State.

He became an emeritus professor in 1935. In the same year, he became a member of the Sächsische Akademie der Wissenschaften. His successor in Leipzig was the Austrian Adolf Helbok in 1935. As an academic teacher, Kötzschke supervised over 100 doctoral theses from 1906 until his retirement. Important academic students were Karlheinz Blaschke, Heinz Quirin, Herbert Helbig and Walter Schlesinger. In 1942, Kötzschke was admitted as a corresponding member of the Prussian Academy of Sciences. After World War II, Kötzschke was again entrusted with the direction of the Institute for German Regional and Folk History from 1946 to 1949, which was reopened on 7 October 1946. Kötzschke continued to teach at the University of Leipzig until shortly before his death on 3 August 1949 and endeavoured to rebuild the destroyed seminar library.

Kötzschke became the founder of regional historical research as a scientific discipline. He is considered an expert on medieval economic history, especially agricultural and settlement history. His publications such as the Economic History of the Middle Ages, the Saxon History up to the Reformation Period and the Rural Settlement and Agrarianism in Saxony are the culmination of his research. The Rudolf Kötzschke Society was founded in 1994. Kötzschke's work during the Nazi period was first discussed in detail in a volume published in 1999.

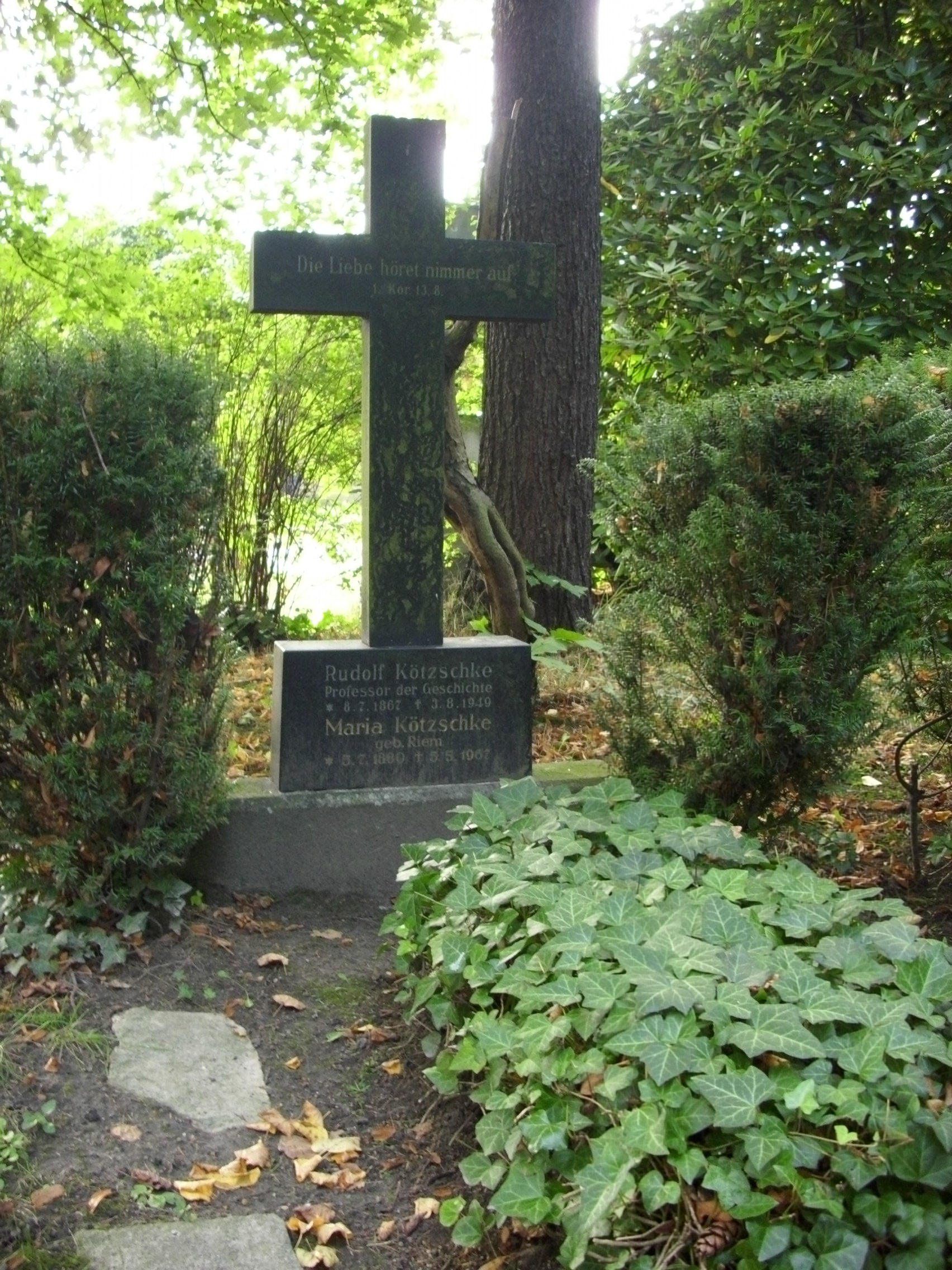
Rudolf Kötzschke gravesite at the Südfriedhof in Leipzig

Kötzschke died in Leipzig at the age of 82.

== Publications ==
- Deutsche und Slaven im mitteldeutschen Osten. Ausgewählte Aufsätze. Edited by Walter Schlesinger, Wissenschaftliche Buchgesellschaft, Darmstadt 1961.
- Ländliche Siedlung und Agrarwesen in Sachsen (Forschungen zur deutschen Landeskunde. Vol. 77, ISSN 0375-6343). Published from the estate by Herbert Helbig. Publishing house of the Bundesanstalt für Landeskunde, Remagen 1953.
- Die Anfänge des deutschen Rechtes in der Siedlungsgeschichte des Ostens. (Ius Teutonicum) (Berichte über die Verhandlungen der Sächsischen Akademie der Wissenschaften. Philologisch-Historische Klasse 93, 2, ISSN 0138-5151). Hirzel, Leipzig 1941.
- with Hellmut Kretzschmar: Sächsische Geschichte. Werden und Wandlungen eines Deutschen Stammes und seiner Heimat im Rahmen der Deutschen Geschichte. 2 volumes (Vol. 1: Vor- und Frühgeschichte, Mittelalter und Reformationszeit. Vol. 2: Geschichte der Neuzeit seit der Mitte des 16. Jahrhunderts.). Heinrich, Dresden 1935 (in one volume: Sächsische Geschichte. Weltbild-Verlag, Augsburg 1995, ISBN 3-89350-705-1).
- Allgemeine Wirtschaftsgeschichte des Mittelalters (Handbuch der Wirtschaftsgeschichte. Vol. 2). Fischer, Jena 1924 (Nachdruck. Olms, Hildesheim among others 1998, ISBN 3-487-10736-8).
- as publisher: Quellen zur Geschichte der ostdeutschen Kolonisation im 12. bis 14. Jahrhundert (Quellensammlung zur deutschen Geschichte. Vol. 7, ZDB-ID 2536018-8). Teubner, Leipzig among others 1912 (2nd edition. idem 1931).
- Deutsche Wirtschaftsgeschichte bis zum 17. Jahrhundert (Grundriss der Geschichtswissenschaft. Series 2, part. 1). Teubner, Leipzig 1907 (2nd revised edition as Grundzüge der deutschen Wirtschaftsgeschichte bis zum 17. Jahrhundert. ebenda 1921).
