= The Cambridge World History =

2015 book by Merry E. Wiesner-Hanks

The Cambridge World History. Volume 1: Introducing World History, to 10,000 BCE, edited by David Christian.

The Cambridge World History is a seven volume history of the world in nine books published by Cambridge University Press in 2015. The editor in chief is Merry E. Wiesner-Hanks. The history takes a comparativist approach.

== Approach ==
Speaking in 2013, the editor of volume three, Norman Yoffee, described the history as being "conceived by a group of world historians, that is people who insist that large indeed global relations are essential in understanding local histories, and they are dedicated comparativists."

== Organisation ==
Each volume is organised as a series of essays with accompanying photographs, illustrations, diagrams and maps. The separate volumes take a thematic and chronologically overlapping approach. The first volume discusses the period before the invention of writing including the Paleolithic era to 10,000 BCE. The second discusses the development of agriculture and the period 12,000 BCE to 500 CE. Later volumes cover progressively shorter but still overlapping periods.

== Volumes and editors ==
The work is in seven volumes over nine books, volumes 6 and 7 being published in two parts each.

- Volume 1: Introducing World History, to 10,000 BCE, David Christian.
- Volume 2: A World with Agriculture, 12,000 BCE–500 CE, Graeme Barker and Candice Goucher.
- Volume 3: Early Cities in Comparative Perspective, 4000 BCE–1200 CE, Norman Yoffee.
- Volume 4: A World with States, Empires and Networks 1200 BCE–900 CE, Craig Benjamin.
- Volume 5: Expanding Webs of Exchange and Conflict, 500CE–1500CE, Benjamin Z. Kedar and Merry E. Wiesner-Hanks.
- Volume 6: The Construction of a Global World, 1400–1800 CE, Part 1: Foundations, Jerry H. Bentley, Sanjay Subrahmanyam and Merry E. Wiesner-Hanks.
- Volume 6: The Construction of a Global World, 1400–1800 CE, Part 2: Patterns of Change, Jerry H. Bentley, Sanjay Subrahmanyam and Merry E. Wiesner-Hanks.
- Volume 7: Production, Destruction and Connection, 1750–Present, Part 1: Structures, Spaces, and Boundary Making, J. R. McNeill and Kenneth Pomeranz.
- Volume 7: Production, Destruction and Connection 1750–Present, Part 2: Shared Transformations, J. R. McNeill and Kenneth Pomeranz.
