= Otto Brunner =

Austrian historian

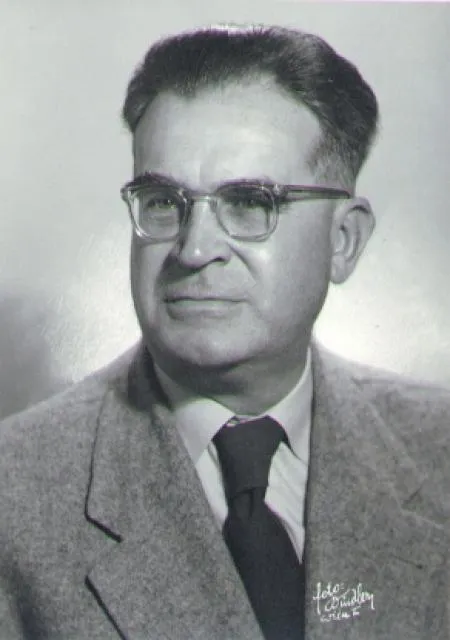
- Born: 21 April 1898; Mödling, Lower Austria
- Died: 12 June 1982 (aged 84); Hamburg

Academic work
- Discipline: History
- Institutions: University of Vienna; University of Hamburg; Institute for Austrian Historical Research
- Main interests: later medieval and early modern European social history

Otto Brunner (21 April 1898 in Mödling, Lower Austria – 12 June 1982 in Hamburg) was an Austrian historian. He is best known for his work on later medieval and early modern European social history.

Brunner's research made a sharp break with the traditional forms of political and social history practiced in German and Austrian academia in the late nineteenth and early twentieth centuries, proposing in its place a new model of social history informed by attention to "folkish" cultural values, particularly as related to political violence and ideas of lordship and leadership.

He taught at the University of Vienna and later the University of Hamburg. From 1940 to 1945, he also served as the director of the Institute for Austrian Historical Research (Institut für österreichische Geschichtsforschung) in Vienna, a prestigious school for archival and historical studies.

== Historical views and works ==
Brunner ranks as one of the most important German medievalists of the twentieth century, but his legacy as a historian in post-war Austria and Germany has become controversial. Along with many conservative Austrian academics in the 1920s and 1930s, Brunner embraced pan-Germanistic politics and welcomed the Nazi Anschluss of 1938. He attempted to join the Nazi Party in 1938, though his application was held up until 1943, with a renewed application accepted in November 1943 and made retrospective to 1 January 1941 with membership number 9.140.316 — Nazis tended to be suspicious of those who rushed to "jump on the bandwagon" and held out full party membership only to those who demonstrated exceptional, and early, commitment to the Nazi cause. Nonetheless, Brunner's 1939 book Land und Herrschaft (Land and Lordship) was welcomed as a seminal contribution to a "new" German historiography that valorized the historical role of the "folk" (German: Volk), the Germanic racial-ethnic community whose citizenry and spirit the Nazis claimed to embody. In the book, which won him the Verdun Prize in 1941 for outstanding historiography in Germany, Brunner argued that the idea of a "Land"—a historically and culturally distinct region within the larger medieval imperial polity—was not simply an invention of feudal law, but an outgrowth of more organic and culturally complex claims to power (German: Herrschaft) associated with the idea of patriarchal rule over a household and its members (German: Hausherrschaft), as well as that of a chieftain over his band of warriors (German: Gefolgschaftsrecht). These traditions, Brunner argued, were fundamental aspects of Germanic folk-consciousness and social life and played a key role in shaping the history of German lands. He criticized then-current approaches to history which viewed medieval institutions and legal practices as primitive antecedents of a supposedly more advanced form of political community, namely the constitutional nation-state. (The radical devaluation of the idea of political liberalism and the centrality of the democratic nation-state could also be found in the writings of the fascist legal theorist Carl Schmitt, whose work Brunner followed closely and cited in his books.)

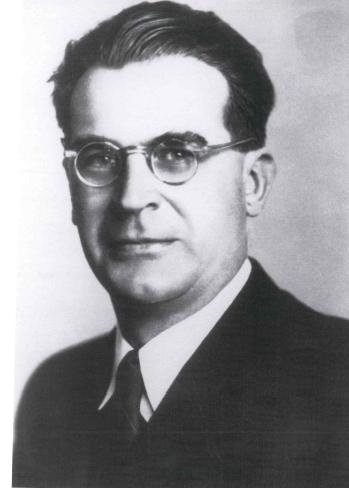

Although his intellectual efforts were clearly aligned with the Nazis, Brunner was apparently not personally antisemitic and even used his own resources and political connections during World War II to protect the mother of a colleague, Erich Zöllner, who was part-Jewish and would have been subject to deportation. Due to his political affiliations, Brunner was forced out of his university post in 1945 and worked for a number of years as an independent scholar before being appointed to the chair of medieval history at Hamburg in 1954 as successor to Hermann Aubin, a scholar of eastern European history with notably similar political sympathies. In the post-war period, Brunner continued to write on medieval and early-modern social history. Land und Herrschaft remained a standard text in Germany for the history of medieval social organization from a cultural perspective. In 1949, Brunner published his second acclaimed work, Adeliges Landleben und Europäischer Geist (Noble Rural Life and the European Spirit), a highly original biography of the Austrian baron Wolf Helmhard von Hohberg (1612–1688) which illuminated the shared cultural and intellectual values of the European nobility in the early-modern period. He also produced a collection of essays, Neue Wege der Verfassungs- und Sozialgeschichte (New Paths of Constitutional and Social History) (1956) which presented some of the ideas of Land und Herrschaft in a modified form and attempted to offer an expanded notion of European history as the basis for a new global culture.

Brunner also contributed, with Werner Conze and Reinhart Koselleck, to a major encyclopedic work, Geschichtliche Grundbegriffe or Fundamental Concepts in History, which helped shape a new discipline, that of conceptual history. Conceptual history deals with the evolution of paradigmatic ideas and value-systems - such as "liberty" or "reform" - over time. Brunner, along with his colleagues, believed that social history—indeed all historical reflection—must begin with an understanding of historically contingent cultural values and practices in their particular contexts over time.

== Legacy and controversy ==
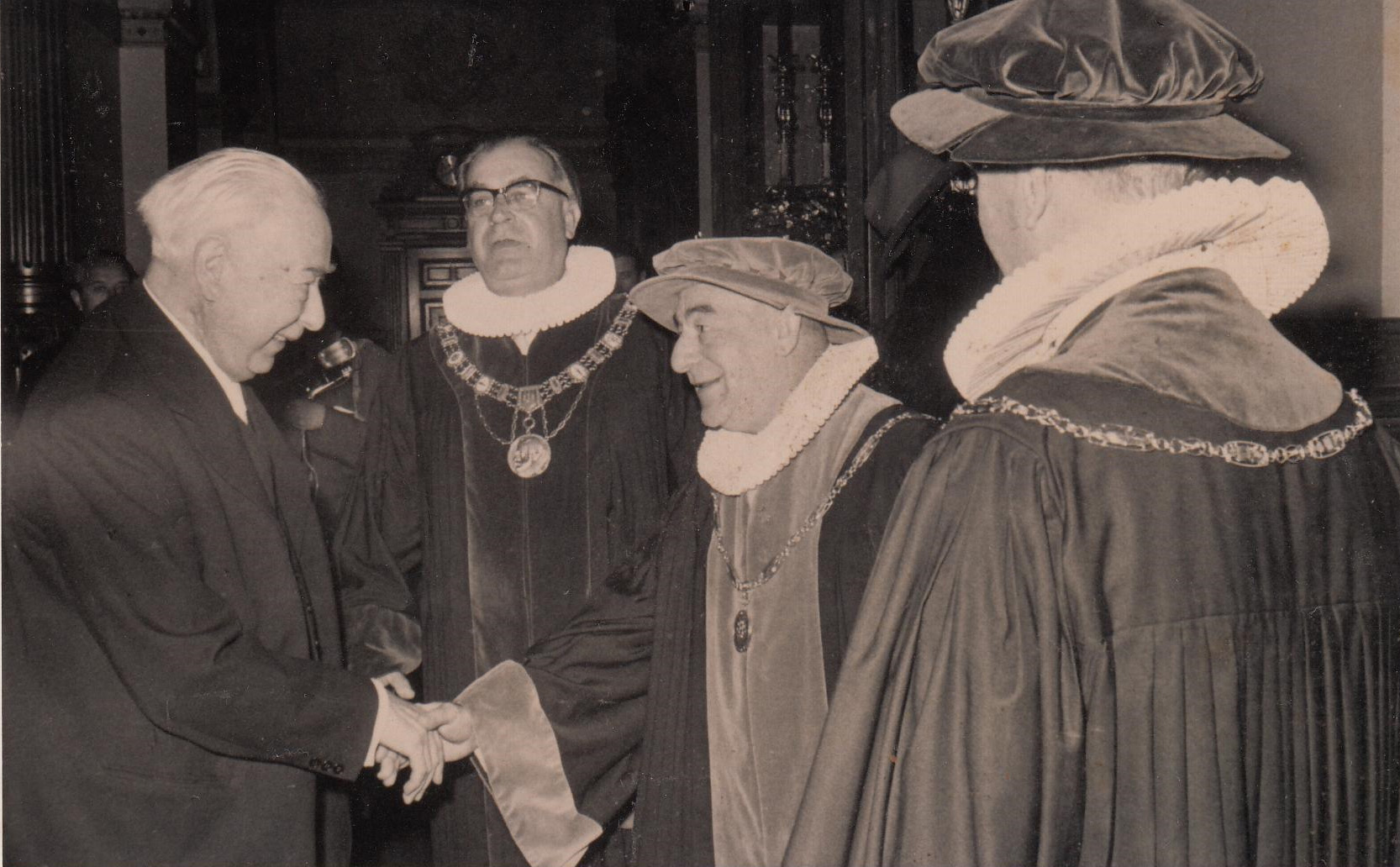

Brunner, along with historians like Karl Bosl, Walter Schlesinger, Theodor Schieder and Werner Conze—all of whom supported, or were openly sympathetic to, Nazism in one way or another before and during the war—dominated the theory and teaching of medieval social history in post-war Germany and Austria. A few scholars, like the Czech medievalist František Graus, attempted to raise questions about the ideological implications of their methods and theories, as well as the tenability of some of their historical interpretations, but failed to effectively displace them from their position in the academy. More recently, the Israeli medievalist Gadi Algazi leveled a major critique against Brunner's theories, charging that Brunner read his sources through a fascist lens and that his books were clearly intended to support a Nazi vision of cultural history. Others, like the Göttingen historian Otto Gerhard Oexle, have argued that Brunner's work should be understood in the broader context of historical attitudes in the 1920s and 30's and not simply dismissed as Nazi propaganda. The historian Hanna Skoda has said that "his own political views sit uncomfortably with a historiographical willingness to take his conclusions very seriously". Several concepts and models by Brunner are discussed in historical studies to this day, also under the question of the extent to which they were influenced by Nazi ideas. This applies to the notion of the whole house, in which Brunner saw the key term to describe the basic units of premodern societies, or to his definition of the feud, which he understood as a central form of medieval politics. In his work Land und Herrschaft, which is still discussed today, Brunner designed an influential model for the emergence of late medieval sovereignty. In Medieval Studies, Brunner's merit is seen in the fact that he tried to capture and present the medieval constitutional structures not with modern, but with their own appropriate terms.

Brunner's central constitutional work Land und Herrschaft was also interpreted as a historiographical rejection of the concept of his contemporary Carl Schmitt, who defined the “political” with a strong emphasis on the concept of the enemy. According to Brunner's understanding, the functioning of the political world as a system of order was much more dependent on the “friendship”: Medieval history was shaped by the primacy of maintaining peace in coexistence through a common understanding of law. The decisive factor is not the struggle for power per se, but the struggle for law, which is essentially a struggle for the protection of the common order of peace. From today's perspective, it is emphasized in this context that Brunner set an “ideal of integration” with his concept of the whole house and thus largely excluded conflicts from the consideration of medieval history. Recent studies criticize Brunner's apodictic insistence on war as the basis of existence in the Middle Ages. At the same time, they relativize the criticism of his work. Some of the more recent research (Algazi, Kortüm) would start from an anachronistic conception of the Middle Ages, which regards violence as an end in itself and not as a means of safeguarding the law and creating peace. At the same time, medieval “countries” would be seen as ideological constructions, but not as actually existing communities of honor, benefit and peace that defy modern criteria of conception. At the same time, the research findings of Algazi and Kortüm are critically questioned, which Otto Brunner locates purely ideologically and ideologically, but overlooks his integration into a modernizing national historiography, which in many ways prepared the "cultural turn" of the 60s and 70s that in the historical sciences continues to have an effect today.

Otto Brunner died in 1982 as professor-emeritus of medieval history at Hamburg.

== Major works ==
1. Land and Lordship: Structures of Governance in Medieval Austria, trans. Howard Kaminsky and James Van Horn Melton (Philadelphia: University of Pennsylvania Press, 1992). Originally published as: Land und Herrschaft: Grundfragen der territorialen Verfassungsgeschichte Südostdeutschlands im Mittelalter Veröffentlichungen des Instituts für Geschichtsforschung und Archivwissenschaft in Wien (Baden-bei-Wien, 1939).
2. Adeliges Landleben und europäischer Geist. Leben und Werk Wolf Helmhards von Hohberg 1612–1688 (Salzburg: Otto Müller, 1949)
3. Abendländisches Geschichtsdenken (Hamburg: Selbstverl. d. Univ., 1954)
4. Neue Wege der Sozialgeschichte. Vorträge u. Aufsätze, (Göttingen: Vandenhoeck & Ruprecht, 1956).
5. Geschichtliche Grundbegriffe: Historisches Lexikon zur politisch-sozialen Sprache in Deutschland, ed. Otto Brunner; Werner Conze; Reinhart Koselleck (Stuttgart: Klett-Cotta, 1972–1997)
6. Sozialgeschichte Europas im Mittelalter (Göttingen: Vandenhoeck & Ruprecht, 1978).

== Reappraisals of his scholarship ==
1. Gadi Algazi, Herrengewalt und Gewalt der Herren im späten Mittelalter: Herrschaft, Gegenseitigkeit und Sprachgebrauch. (Frankfurt am Main/New York: Campus, 1996).
2. František Graus, “Verfassungsgeschichte des Mittelalters,” Historische Zeitschrift 243 (1986), pp. 529–590.
3. Otto Gerhard Oexle, “Sozialgeschichte – Begriffsgeschichte – Wissenschaftsgeschichte. Anmerkungen zum Werk Otto Brunners,” Vierteljahresschrift für Sozial- und Wirtschaftsgeschichte 71 (1983), pp. 305–341.
4. James Van Horn Melton, “From Folk History to Structural History: Otto Brunner (1898-1982) and the Radical-Conservative Roots of German Social History,” in Hartmut Lehmann and James Van Horn Melton, eds., Paths of Continuity: Central European Historiography from the 1930s to the 1950s (Cambridge: Cambridge University Press, 1994), pp. 263–292.
5. Peter N. Miller, "Nazis and Neo-Stoics: Otto Brunner and Gerhard Oestreich Before and after the Second World War," Past and Present 176 (2002), pp. 144–186
6. Langmaier, Konstantin. (2016). "'Dem Land Ere und Nucz, Frid und Gemach': Das Land als Ehr-, Nutz- und Friedensgemeinschaft: Ein Beitrag zur Diskussion um den Gemeinen Nutzen," Zeitschrift für Historische Forschung 31, No. 4 (2004), pp. 529–549.
