= Archiv für Diplomatik =

The Archiv für Diplomatik, Schriftgeschichte, Siegel- und Wappenkunde (shortened to Archiv für Diplomatik, and abbreviated as AfD) is a historical journal dedicated to the Auxiliary sciences of history.

The journal, founded by Edmund E. Stengel, is the successor of the Archiv für Urkundenforschung, founded in 1908 by Michael Tangl and is published annually since 1955. It publishes research and essays on all topics of auxiliary sciences of history from the early Middle Ages to the current time, with an emphasis on diplomatics and associated areas. Former publishers include Walter Heinemeyer; current editors are Theo Kölzer und Walter Koch.
