= Candice Goucher =

American historian (born 1953)

Candice Lee Goucher (born 1953) is an American historian. She is Professor of History and co-director of the Collective for Social and Environmental Justice at Washington State University, United States. She specialises in world history, African history, Caribbean history and the history of food. Her previous post was as Chair of the Black Studies department at Portland State University, Oregon.

== Early life and education ==
Goucher was born in 1953. She has a master's degree in Art history and archeology from Columbia University and a Ph.D. (1984) in African history from the University of California, Los Angeles.

== Career ==
Goucher was one of two lead scholars involved in a 26-part video and online course Bridging World History. She is on the editorial board of the seven-volume Cambridge World History, and co-edited its volume 2: A World with Agriculture, 12,000 BCE–500 CE (2015) with Graeme Barker.

Her 2014 book Congotay! Congotay! A Global History of Caribbean Food (Routledge, 2014) won the Gourmand Award for "Best Book on Caribbean Food (National Category)" for 2016.
