= Karl Bosl =

German historian (1908–1993)

Karl Bosl (11 November 1908 – 18 January 1993) was a German regional historian. He held the chair for Bavarian regional history at LMU Munich from 1960 until his retirement in 1977.

Bosl was elected a full member of the Bavarian Academy of Sciences in 1961, a corresponding member of the Medieval Academy of America in 1970 and of the British Academy the same year. In 1973, he was elected a corresponding member of the Austrian Academy of Sciences.

In 2011, his conduct during the Second World War, including his links with the Nazi government and his claims of having been a member of the German resistance, were examined in a book by Benjamin Z. Kedar and Peter Herde. He had eulogized the Nazi resistance fighter Robert Limpert at Limpert's funeral in the beginning of attempts to cover up his past association with the Nazi Party.
