= Heinrich Srbik =

Austrian historian (1878–1951)

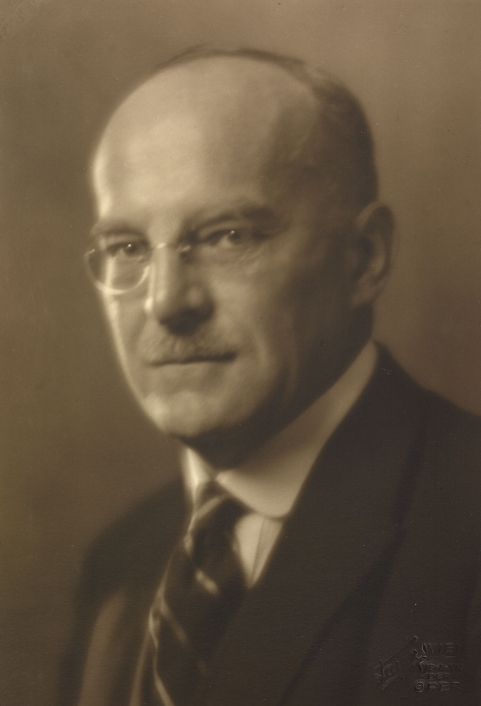
- Born: 10 November 1878; Vienna, Austria
- Died: 16 February 1951 (aged 72); Ehrwald, Tyrol, Austria
- Education: "Theresianum", Vienna; University of Vienna
- Occupations: Historian; Librarian; Politician; Minister for Education and Training (Austria)
- Employer(s): University of Vienna; University of Graz
- Political party: NSDAP
- Spouse: Johanna Nissl (1889–1972)
- Children: 3

Heinrich Ritter von Srbik (legally Heinrich Srbik in Austria after 1919; 10 November 1878 – 16 February 1951) was an Austrian historian who became involved on the fringes of politics before and during the Hitler years.

== Life and works ==
=== Family provenance ===
Heinrich von Srbik was born in Vienna. He was a twin. His father, Dr. Franz Joseph von Srbik (1841–1910), was a lawyer by training who was employed in the Austro-Hungarian Ministry of Finance. Franz Joseph von Srbik was also an expert on art history and a noted collector of old copper-plate engravings. Heinrich's mother, Walpurga Graurt (1847–1898), was a daughter of the Catholic historian and classical philologist from the north of Germany, Heinrich Wilhelm Grauert, who had died young. His twin was the army officer turned glaciologist Robert Srbik (1878–1948). There were two older siblings. Heinrich von Srbik's grandfather Franz Seraphicus (1807–1897) had received his hereditary knighthood, and the accompanying right to add the word "von" in front of the family name in 1868, only ten years before Heinrich's birth. With the new post-imperial constitution agreed in 1919, the nobility and the titles by which they differentiated themselves were abolished. Heinrich von Srbik continued to use the "von" as far as possible, and indeed rejected the idea of changing the family name from "Srbik" to "Serbik" because he feared it might lead to the complete loss of the "von" prefix. There is no consistency between surviving sources over whether or when to include the "von" in his name.

=== Early years ===
During the early and middle 1890s von Srbik attended the Theresianum, a prestigious secondary school in Vienna 10, a short distance to the south of the city centre. Here he was taught by the journalist-historian Eugen Guglia who triggered his enthusiasm for the study of history.

In 1897 he enrolled at the University of Vienna. Between 1898 and 1901 he studied at the university's Institute for Austrian Historical Research. The nature of the historical identity of Austria, subsumed as it was for many purposes in the ethnically and culturally disparate Habsburg empire, was much debated among scholars in Vienna during this period, and the theme was one which would become central in von Srbik's later researches. As a newly qualified historian he would become an enthusiastic supporter of closer economic integration within the Austrian empire as a means whereby the entire construct might be prevented from total disintegration during an age of intensifying nationalism. Student contemporaries at the institute included Wilhelm Bauer (1877–1953) and Hans Hirsch (1878–1940) both of whom became friends and, later, professional colleagues. As a student, during 1898/99 Srbik joined the "Verein Deutscher Hochschüler", a student fraternity better remembered by its subsequent name as the "Burschenschaft Gothia".

In 1901 Heinrich von Srbik received his doctorate in return for a study on Frederick III, Burgrave of Nuremberg. His supervisor for this work was Oswald Redlich. Other historians by whom he was particularly influenced during his student years included Alfons Dopsch and Engelbert Mühlbacher. The focus of his studies as a university student was on medieval history. After Mühlbacher's death in 1903 it was the medievalist Dopsch who, aware of the academic currents of the times, encouraged him to turn his attentions more towards social and economic history.

=== Early post-qualification career ===
Thus equipped, in October 1902 he became a staff member at the "Commission for Modern Austrian History", working for Ludwig Bittner on creating a catalogue index of Austrian state treaties and, more specifically, from September 1903 on a catalogue index of state treaties concluded between Austria and the Netherlands. In 1904 he started on a parallel second job, working as an internee or assistant (sources differ) at the Institute for Austrian Historical Research (since 1903 under the direction of Emil von Ottenthal), where he continued to work till 1912, by which time he had taken on the role of librarian at the institute.

Meanwhile in 1907 von Srbik received his habilitation (higher post-graduate degree) from the University Department for Austrian History, in return for a piece of work on the Austrian export trade between 1658 and 1780 during "the age of mercantilism". The habilitation qualification opened the way for a teaching career in the universities sector and gave him authorisation to lecture on Austrian history. He now accepted a position as a "Privatdozent" (tutor). Three years later he obtained the far less restrictive "venia docendi" (authorisation ) permitting him to lecture and teach "general history" at the university, on the basis of a treatise he produced on the seventeenth century mercantilist-cameralist, Wilhelm von Schröder.

In 1911 von Srbik accepted an additional supplementary appointment as a "Beisitzer" (loosely, "process assessor") on the "Burschenschaftliche Historische Kommission" (fraternity historical commission).

=== Graz ===
In 1912 the University of Graz, in Styria, far to the south of Vienna, appointed von Srbik to an extraordinary professorship in "general history". Promotion came in 1917 when he became an ordinary (i.e. full) professor in Modern History and Economic History. In the long summer breaks during the four years between 1915 and 1918, as a reserve officer (presumably ever since having undertaken his military service two decades earlier), von Srbik served in the Austrian army on the Italian front. During his years at Graz he published his 256 page "Studies on the Austrian Salt Industry" in 1917. After that he turned away from economic history and, with "Wallensteins End" published in 1920, switched to the history of political ideas.

=== Vienna ===
Srbik returned to Vienna in 1922, taking over the university teaching chair in Modern History. Among his better remembered students from his Vienna years were the writer Heimito von Doderer, Chancellor Josef Klaus and the historians Taras Borodajkewycz and Hellmuth Rössler.

Soon after his return to Vienna he was invited, by Erich Marcks (1861–1938) to produce an essay on Metternich for a compilation volume that Marcks was producing on "Masters of Politics". The essay proved the launch pad for a more substantial project. Heinrich Srbik's two volume biography of Metternich was published in 1925 and is still considered by admirers, almost a century later, a standard work on the man whom many lauded or blamed for having created a political road map that was followed across much of Europe for more than a generation after 1815. Srbik is credited by some with having coined the concept of the "Metternich System", though a consensus has emerged among commentators more recently that Metternich himself had rejected belief in anything so prescriptive as a "system", and would indeed have taken issue with a number of Srbik's other conclusions about his political methods and achievements. Srbik saw Metternich as a conservative, whose world view had been formed before the French Revolution, who stood for defending the monarchist state against the destructive impulses created by revolutionary and egalitarian precepts. Even if he backed "pure monarchy", unconstrained by and constitutional limitations, Srbik insisted that Metternich was the enemy, equally, of monarchical despotism. For Metternich it was less the will of a monarch and more the rule of law that should preserve good order within the state and the balance of power between states.

=== Ministerial appointment ===
The 1927 July uprising was followed by a period of intensifying political instability, amidst indications that the post-imperial republican democracy imposed in 1919 had never entirely taken root in Austria within the political class; nor, indeed, among voters. Srbik himself made no secret of his belief that the truncated version of Austria that had emerged after the war was simply too small to be viable as a stand-alone state. Srbik would not have been seen as part of the political establishment. However, when yet another new government took power in September 1929, Heinrich Srbick was a member of it. The new chancellor, Johannes Schober, was not a new face in politics, having already served as chancellor (albeit relatively briefly) as early as 1921/22. Unusually, there is no indication that Schober had ever been a member of any political party. Even more unusually, in the broader context of European political developments during the first half of the twentieth century, approximately 50% of the ministers in the Schober government in office between September 1929 and September 1930 had no party political affiliation. One of these independent members of the government, managing the Department for Training and Education between 16 October 1929 and 25 September 1930, was Heinrich Srbik. In the context of the wider political and economic crisis, there was little time for developing or implementing any changes in respect of training and education, however. It became known that Srbik had been offered and accepted the job only after the chancellor's preferred choice, the well-regarded neurosurgeon Anton Eiselsberg, had turned it down. Srbik's 1929 incursion into the world of government is reported in sources, if at all, as a brief and inconsequential "intermezzo" during what was, in the wider context, an exceptionally eventful year.

=== Career peak ===
Meanwhile Srbik's reputation and career as an historian had been transformed by the timely appearance of his Metternich biography and the positive reaction to it in academic circles. During the later 1920s and early 1930s he received offers of professorships from the universities of Cologne, Bonn, Munich and even Berlin. He turned them all down. His brief ministerial career had deferred but not terminated the major project on which he was working at the time in Vienna, a five volume work entitled "Sources on Austria's German policy 1859–1866" which would be published, volume by volume, between 1934 and 1938.

=== Bears' Cave ===
During the 1920s, as the European economies remained precarious and politics became increasingly polarised, a shadowy network of traditionalist university professors came into existence at the University of Vienna. Known as the "Bears' Cave" group, they saw themselves as representing Christian-Socialism and German nationalism. They feared and fought against communism and socialism. And they were antisemitic. There are believed to have been at least eighteen of them at the university, many in positions of significant influence in respect of university politics. Heinrich Srbik was one of these. One reason for the secrecy surrounding the group was that their advocacy of a limit of perhaps 10% on the proportion of academic posts that might be filled by Jews was in direct contravention of the principles of equality of opportunity that were enshrined in Austria's post-imperial constitution. Behind the scenes "Bears' Cave" members quietly used their connections across the Philosophy Faculty (which at that time covered the arts and humanities along with the natural sciences) to make it difficult for left-wing scholars and those identified as Jewish to obtain academic appointments at the university, or even habilitation degrees, the higher post-doctoral qualifications that might secure a life-long career teaching in the universities sector. The group's activities seem to have gone largely unremarked at the time, but after 1945, as newsreels of the Nazi death camps created popular awareness across Europe of the nature and extent of the Holocaust, Srbnik's involvement as a member of as the "Bears' Cave" would leave him isolated and, in the judgment of many post-war commentators disgraced, during his final years.

=== Beyond "small Germany" vs. "greater Germany" ===
Through the nineteenth century there had been debates in nationalist circles as to whether a future unified Germany should consist of a "small Germany", ruled from Berlin and excluding the multi-ethnic Austrian Empire, or a "greater Germany", consisting of German speaking lands across northern Germany, together with Baden, Württemberg, Bavaria and (at least the German-speaking parts of) the Austrian empire. Both "solutions" presented a string of follow-on questions, among which one of the most pressing concerned what might become of those parts of the Austrian empire where German was not the principal language of the inhabitants if they were to be excluded from a new "greater Germany". The reality of German unification, defined by force of arms in 1871, looked like a victory on the ground for the "small Germany" solution, and over the next few years Chancellor Bismarck set about creating a relatively centralised German state, inspired by the Anglo-French example, and controlled from Berlin. But among Austrian nationalists the arguments were far from settled. In Vienna there remained those who called for a "greater Germany", ruled from Vienna but administered on a more decentralised basis, drawing inspiration from the administrative structures that had evolved and operated over many centuries until 1806 in the Holy Roman Empire. Srbik moved beyond this binary debate with his belief that the better solution would be not a "small" or "greater" Germany but a "complete Germany" ("Gesamtdeutschland"). By focusing only on two alternative nation-state structures, the traditionally mainstream debate had overlooked the more important focus on the ethnic group, defined by elements of shared language, cultural consciousness and history. The short-hand term for this ethnicity-based classification – subsequently distorted, especially in anglophone historiographies, by baggage deriving from Hiltlerite associations - was "Volk". Srbik's "complete Germany" vision sought to address the challenge represented by a large number of Germans living in what had been before 1919, the Austrian Empire, and who now found themselves members of increasingly self-aware ethnic minorities in a series of relatively small and militarily vulnerable states positioned between Germany and the Soviet Union, in the region known at the time as "Mitteleuropa".

There were good historical reasons why the Mitteleuropa challenge was more visible from Vienna than from Berlin. The post-1919 political structure of the region represented an imposed solution to the break-up of the Austro-Hungarian empire, based around Anglo-American statist conceptions of nationalism which, it could be argued, took no account of more nuanced "on the ground" realities. Like many Viennese, Srbik's own genealogical provenance reflected the ethnic diversity fostered by government structures before and during the German Confederation years. His mother's familial provenance was centred most recently on Westphalia, while his maternal grandfather had been born even further away from Vienna, in Amsterdam. His family name, "Srbik", indicated Serbian connections on his father's side, and there were also Czechoslovak family links from not too far back. Yet Heinrich Srbik had been born into a German family with German as his first language in a German-speaking imperial capital. Many of his fellow Viennese would have known that, had they bothered to research their ancestries, they would have found similarly diverse family trees in terms of ethnic identities and provenance. And in Vienna before 1914 – even more before 1871 – there would have been very little pressure to perceive any significant contradiction between a German self-identity and the constantly proliferating ethnic diversity that had developed through more than six centuries of "Mitteleuropa" under the Habsburg monarchy . It is reasonable to conclude that Srbik will have been developing his "complete Germany" vision of history from childhood. It is certainly apparent, from his surviving written work, and after 1922 from his commercially successful published work, that as it appeared in and after 1929, Srbik's "complete Germany" historical prism was the product of a lengthy, detailed and meticulously source-based gestation.

At a well-attended conference of fellow scholars held in Salzburg in September 1929, Heinrich Srbik was ready to give his "complete Germany" alternative interpretation of German history its first reported public airing in a coherent, if necessarily summarized form, in a talk on "German unity". The longer version would have to await the four volumes published between 1935 and 1942, though the first two volumes, published during 1935, provided a sufficient exposition for most purposes. Srbik did not work in a vacuum, and by this time the "complete Germany" vision (identified by some less sympathetic anglophone commentators as a "total Germany" vision) was already beginning to gain a following in some quarters, interpreted by some as a synthesis between the "small Germany" and the "greater Germany" views, while being reported elsewhere as a powerful argued vote, backed by a seldom matched depth of mastery over the sources, for "neither of the above". There was, to be sure, an inherent tension to be acknowledged between the national and the supra-national when it came to applying the "complete Germany" vision in "Mitteleuropa", but the tension was one which appeared less insuperable in the context of Habsburg monarchy traditions than it would from the Anglo-French statist perspective that became increasingly ubiquitous across Europe and among formerly European colonial territories through the twentieth century. Srbik's answer was to celebrate ethnic diversity as a source more of great strength than of inherent weakness, which was no more than a spelling out of the widespread assumption that had underpinned Hapsburg rule through decades of ever sharper nationalist pressures during the nineteenth century. His acceptance that it would be natural for those of a self-defined ethnic German background to dominate government and society across the formerly Austrian or Russian imperial territories of central Europe even when non-German speakers were in the majority was nevertheless open to challenge, and when brutally imposed by force of arms on the basis of simplistic "Nazi" mantras from Berlin would become generally discredited during the 1940s, and irrelevant in the wake of industrial-scale ethnic cleansing after 1944. During the 1930s, however, Heinrich von Srbik was widely respected as one of the leading historians of his generation, and the "complete Germany" vision with which his reputation was associated became increasingly mainstream across and beyond German-speaking central Europe.

=== Régime change ===
The Hitler government took power in Berlin in early 1933 and lost no time in transforming Germany into a one- party dictatoriship. Developments in Austria closely followed those in Germany during the five years between 1933 and 1938. Already, two months after the Hitler take-over in Berlin, the Austrian parliament in Vienna voted itself out of existence. The Austrofascist régime ruling Austria between 1934 and 1938 was as avowedly post-democratic as Hitler's Germany. Critics keen to give Srbik the benefit of the doubt when trying to evaluate his relationship with National Socialism stress that he was always uncompromising in his rejection of extremist political positions driven by government, whether in terms of the great matters of state or in terms of university administration. He was critical of the Nazis' totalitarian radicalism in government, and during the twelve Hitler years he became increasingly distanced and then estranged from government ideology, which itself became increasingly brutalised through the period. Nevertheless, there is no indication on the part of admirers or of critics of Heinrich Sbrik, that when democracy was unceremoniously abolished across German-speaking central Europe during 1933 and 1934, he jumped in to condemn the development. Like many others, inside and outside Austria, he was evidently persuaded by the economic crises and ensuing political polarisation that republican democracy had failed and probably needed to be sacrificed to the greater good.

=== Anschluß ===
As political conflict continued to spill onto the streets, after 1934 the "greater Germany" and "complete Germany" visions rose up the political and public agenda in Austria. The inherent overlap between the two was exacerbated through the simplifying instincts of media commentators and populist politicians. On 12 March 1938, after several months of intense political pressure on the Austrian government to agree to a coming together of the Austrian and German states, the German army crossed the border into Austria to be followed, later that day, by Adolf Hitler accompanied by a bodyguard of several thousand men. The huge bodyguard turned out to be an unnecessary precaution. It was reported that even Hitler was surprised by the warmth of the reception from the crowds as his car passed by on the way past the little town of his birth on the border, en route to Linz where he had attended school and where he spent the night with his team. Meanwhile, the Austrian president had been persuaded to appoint a replacement chancellor. The Czechoslovak-born lawyer Arthur Seyss-Inquart was an enthusiastic supporter of Austrian incorporation into Hitler's new Germany and, in 1938, a close Hitler ally at the heart of the political establishment in Vienna. Chancellor Seyss-Inquart remained in office for only two days. As the result of a last-minute change of plan it was decided that the annexation of Austria into an enlarged version of Germany should be completed at once, meaning that there could be only one chancellor. Seyss-Inquart nevertheless played an important role in the integration process over the next few weeks and months: he nominated 86 trusted Austrians to membership of the Reichstag (parliament). They represented the "Land Österreich" electoral district between the 10 April 1938 "election" and the end of the Nazi regime in May 1945. The Reichstag featured little in the historiography of the Hitler years because it did very little worth recording after 1933, though it continued to convene occasionally until 1942. It is significant in terms of Srbik's own career and his relationship with the régime that in 1938 he was one of the 814 Nazi Party members elected to the 814 seat parliament in Berlin.

A couple of weeks after the election, on 27 April 1938, Heinrich von Srbik delivered a speech in which he greeted the "Austrian annexation" as "the realization of a thousand year dream for the German people". Correspondence from this period survives between Srbik and Seyss-Inquart. In November 1938 Seyss-Inquart joined with others in public celebration of Srbik's birthday. Srbik had accepted party membership on 1 May 1938. His party membership number was 6,104,788 which indicates that, slightly unusually, his membership was backdated. The party was evidently keen to recognize him as one of their own. There is no indication that, at this point, Srbik resisted the idea. Party membership numbers were issued chronologically according to the date of joining the party. Several sources assert that allocating Srbik a lower party membership number than those allocated to other party members joining at the same time was intended to demonstrate the party's appreciation for his long-standing support for party policy.

Nevertheless, Heinrich Srbik never conformed to the conventional image of a battle-hardened unthinking "Nazi true believer". In the judgement of one admittedly relatively supportive commentator, it was as early as 1935, that when he was offered a prestigious and presumably well remunerated teaching chair in modern history in succession to Hermann Oncken at Berlin University, Srbik was "in all probability" dissuaded from accepting the post only after being told by a well-connected friend that the vacancy had arisen because Oncken had fallen victim to a party purge (backed up by a well-choreographed party media campaign) at the university. From other sources it becomes clear that the university authorities in Vienna did everything possible to prevent Srbik from leaving at such a difficult time: the university rector and dean even teamed up to send a letter to the Austrian Ministry of Education insisting that for them he would be irreplaceable and urging the minister to try and find some tempting career-related or for that matter personal inducement to persuade him to stay.

Meanwhile, the Vienna "Gauschulungsamt", which had direct oversight responsibilities for education on behalf of the regional governor, reported that Srbik never participated actively in local party group meetings and rejected the recommendation that he produce an evaluation of racial driving forces in history. Further criticisms of obsessive interest in his own historical perspective appear in the records. There was nevertheless a grudging acknowledgment in the same report that there were no more serious complaints to be made against his character, nor indeed against his research work.

=== President of the Austrian Academy ===
Between 1938 and 1945 Srbik served as president of the Austrian Academy of Sciences and Humanities. The appointment took effect on 1 April 1938. Unlike university professors, academicians were not classified as civil servants by virtue of their academy memberships, and many were already retired (or "released") from any university posts they might previously have held: these were therefore not formally subject to various bizarre and oppressive legal provisions by which the government sought to regulate daily life. The times were nevertheless far from normal. Almost immediately following the annexation of 1938 the academy found it necessary to abolish the 1921 constitution by which it was administrated. This was replaced by a new "provisional constitution" which received the ministerial approval which had become necessary on 24 July 1938 and which, presumably, was viewed as temporary until a more permanent constitution could be agreed. That never happened, however, and the academy's provisional constitution remained in place between 1938 and 1945. Srbik's appointment to the presidency suggests that academicians saw in him a man who could effectively represent the learned body in dealings with government institutions. His re-election in July 1941, after the end of his three year term, endorsed that earlier evaluation. From the perspective of the government, Srbik was – or was at least intended to be – "their man" at the top of the academy and it is unthinkable that he would not have followed party precepts on critical matters such as admissions and appointments. He did not prevent a purge of the academy's Jewish members. There were nevertheless some minor victories. He held out successfully against the government press office objections to the naming of the academy's new "Archive for Austrian History".

Other memberships of learned institutions included Srbik's acceptance by the Berlin-based Prussian Academy of Sciences and Humanities as a corresponding member in 1936. Between 1937 and 1946 he served on the senate (executive council) of the Kaiser Wilhelm Society. He served, in addition, as president of the Historical Commission of the Bavarian Academy of Sciences and Humanities (HiKo) between 1942 and 1945. The HiKo position might have become an important job under more normal circumstances, but under the intensifying wartime pressures of the time it never became more than a sinecure One source lists a further six learned academies of which he was at some point a member, these being those in Budapest, Bucharest, Göttingen, Lund, Paris and London.

=== Later years ===
Between 1940 and 1944 Srbik was involved in a series of disagreements with the party which at the time were evidently construed as being very minor in nature. After the war turned sour in 1942 the government and its agencies became less forgiving, however, and the (unsuccessful) plot to kill Hitler in July 1944 triggered unmistakable and acute nervousness on the part of the government and its agencies. The assassination plot was followed by a massive round-up of possible suspects and a large number of executions. Heinrich Srbik underwent nothing so drastic, but in the late summer of 1944 his home was searched by the security services and, it would appear, papers were removed. By this time he had become terribly disillusioned by the failure of the government to recreate something more closely akin to his own idealistic "complete Germany" vision in the six years that had passed since the annexation. Furthermore, he could no longer escape awareness of the "ever-mounting depravity of the Nazi regime".

At the beginning of 1945 Srbik left Vienna, probably for the last time. His apartment in the Schönbrunn district of Vienna was near the city's main station towards the west and had suffered significant bomb damage. His health had become precarious and he had contracted bronchitis. He was advised by a doctor that he was too sick to travel on a train. It had become no longer possible to lecture at the university due to the growing intensity and frequency of the bombing. He managed to find a lift out of Vienna with someone who was driving west by car. By February 1945 he was living at his second home in Ehrwald (Tyrol), a picturesque little town along the mountain road between Garmisch and Innsbruck, in which he would live out his retirement.

War ended in May 1945. Stalin had insisted that there could be no question of Austria remaining part of Germany after the war and it was accordingly divided into a separate set of military occupation zones. The entire western part of the country, including Ehrwald, was designated as the French occupation zone. Between April 1945 and March 1948 he received no salary, according to at least one source, and was arrested by the French military authorities on a number of occasions. Between periods of detention he was required, during the early months of the occupation, to report to a local gendarmerie once per week.

In October 1945 Heinrich Srbik was formally relieved of his university duties and banned from lecturing or teaching. Significantly – as matters turned out – he was still allowed to write and to publish what he wrote, however. Under the terms of the "National Socialist Law" of 6 February 1947 his university pension was reduced by a third until he reached the age of 70 (which happened only one year later). In June 1948 his residence at Ehrwald was confirmed by the authorities as his lawful residence. In a listing produced in 1948 in the context of the "épuration" programme undertaken by the military administrators, he was classified as a "Lesser Offender" (Minderbelasteter) which lifted the threat of further imprisonment. (The French occupation zone had been slower to embark on a systematic denazification programme than other zones due to an official belief in Paris that "all Germans" – including all Austrians – were culpable for what had been done.) He stayed away from Vienna out of a concern – probably well founded – that in Vienna he risked being disappeared by Soviet military authorities. He professed to see his time in Ehrwald as an opportunity for reflection and personal reassessment He wrote prodigiously, producing expanded and updated versions of several existing works. Despite his stated intention to focus on reassessment, there is little slogan of any fundamental reappraisal of the "complete Germany" thesis with which he had long been associated and which twelve years of Hitler government had totally discredited among mainstream historians from Moscow to Chicago. He continued to insist that his detailed formulation of it had owed absolutely nothing to "Nazi influences" and now that there was no risk from Gestapo surveillance he was openly resentful of the way in which the National Socialists had taken over the concept and distorted it to justify their monstrous actions and beliefs.

In 1951 there was discussion within the VdU, a short-lived nationalist liberal political party, of putting Heinrisch Sbrik's name forward as the VdU candidate in that year's presidential election. He died before the matter could be progressed, however. Burghard Breitner, the surgeon-author whose candidacy the party ended up supporting, secured third place with 15% of the votes in the first round of the election, thereby being eliminated before the run-off second round. In the circumstances it is hard to believe that Srbik would ever have been a serious candidate for the presidency even if he had lived long enough to be selected by the party and participate in the election. Following a three day illness he died in Ehrwald on 16 February 1951. He was formally rehabilitated by the university in 1958 on what would have been his eightieth birthday.

He remains a polarising figure.

== Personal life ==
Heinrich Srbik married Johanna Nissl (1889–1972) at Brixen in September 1912. Despite having been just 38 when he died, Johanna's father, Anton Nissl (1852–1890), had achieved a measure of notability as a professor of canon law.

The couple's three recorded children were born in 1914, 1916 and 1924.

== Recognition (selection) ==
- 1896: Military Cross of Merit
- 1922: Cross of Merit
- 1926: Corresponding membership of the Göttingen Academy of Sciences and Humanities
- 1935: Wolfgang Amadeus Mozart Prize from the Goethe Foundation
- 1936: Honorary Doctorate in political matters ("... rerum politicarum") from Heidelberg University
- 1936: Austrian Medal for Arts and Culture
- 1936: Honorary Member of the New Germany National Historical Institute
- 1938: "Honorary Citizen" at the University of Cologne
- 1943: Goethe Medal for Arts and Sciences
- The residential lane, "Dr.-Heinrich-Srbik-Weg", which runs to the east of the village centre in Ehrwald, is named in Srbik's honour .
