= Hans Hirsch =

Austrian medievalist (1878–1940)

- Born: Johann Hirsch; 27 December 1878; Zwettl, Lower Austria, Austro-Hungarian empire
- Died: 20 August 1940 (aged 61); Vienna, Reichsgau Wien, Germany
- Education: Vienna; Prague
- Occupation: Professor of Medieval History

Hans Hirsch (27 December 1878 – 20 August 1940) was an Austrian academic who worked between 1903 and 1914 on the vast "Monumenta Germaniae Historica" sources project, and subsequently became a full-time professional historian. He accepted an ordinary (full) professorship in history at the German University (as it became known after 1918) in Prague as the war ended, transferring in 1926 to the University of Vienna. The focus of his research and teaching was on medieval history. In parallel he built for himself a reputation as a specialist on the (recently "discovered" - or, at least, reclassified by the media) "Sudeten Germans", which marked him out as a more than averagely politicised historian. His application for party membership was still outstanding at the time of his death, however.

== Life ==
=== Provenance and early years ===
Johann "Hans" Hirsch was born at Zwettl, a small but ancient town in Lower Austria that had grown up around a Cictercian monastery in the hill country of the "Böhmerwald" ("Bohemian Woods") to the north-west of Vienna. An obituary published in 1942 refers to his having lost his father early, while another source gives his father's occupation as that of a cattle dealer and the year of his father's death as 1909. He remained close to his mother, who lived on till 1939, virtually throughout his life.

He evidently received a sound grounding in history and "Love of country" during his school-days, which included a period of study at the Monastery School attached to "Zwettl Abbey". He completed his schooling in 1897 at the "Gymnasium" (secondary school) in Wiener Neustadt, a short distance to the south of the Austrian capital, and close to Austria's traditional frontier with the Kingdom of Hungary. Later that same year he enrolled at the University of Vienna to study history and art history. Between 1899 and 1901 he studied for a teaching qualification at the university's "Institut für Österreichische Geschichtsforschung", where he was influenced, in particular, by Engelbert Mühlbacher. Student contemporaries included Wilhelm Bauer and Heinrich Srbik. Still at Vienna, he received his doctorate, apparently in 1903, in return for a study on the eleventh century foundation records of the Hirsau Reformist Monasteries. The work was supervised by Engelbert Mühlbacher. (Note: Although the doctorate was awarded, "sub auspiciis Imperatoris", only on 30 December 1903, the surviving manuscript of the dissertation is dated 1901.)

=== Monumenta Germaniae Historica ===
Between 1903 and 1914 Hirsch worked as a full-time employee of the "Vienna Diplomata" department of the "Monumenta Germaniae Historica", a vast archives-based project that ran under various configurations between 1819 and 1945 which concerned itself with the careful editing and publication of primary source texts. His first year was spent in Berlin, where he completed the Names Register for a Carolingian volume. In 1904 he was able to return to Vienna, where he was based for the next ten years, albeit with frequent study visits to work on monastic (and other) archives in situ. His time with the "Monumenta Germaniae Historica" enabled him to familiarize himself with document holdings across southern Germany, Switzerland and northern Italy, concentrating on archival sources dating from the eleventh and twelfth centuries. Hirsch received his Habilitation (higher post-graduate degree) from the University of Vienna in 1908. His work, on this occasion, was a series of "Studies of the Monastic Privileges of south German Abbeys in the eleventh and twelfth centuries". (Note: Studien über die Privilegien süddeutscher Klöster des 11. und 12. Jahrhunderts") The Habilitation degree opened up the way to a life-long career in the universities sector, and from 1908 Hirsch combined his job for the "Monumenta Germaniae Historica" with work as a "Privatdozent" (loosely, "tutor") for medieval history and Historical Studies Support Topics, attached to Vienna University. In the judgment of admirers, his habilitation dissertation pointed the way to new research methods which were subsequently widely adopted and adapted by other researchers.

=== War ===
On 31 December 1913 Hirsch accepted an extraordinary professorship in history at the university. Shortly afterwards his academic career was interrupted by the outbreak of a major European war in July 1914, however. Despite his recent promotion, Hirsch was not among the members of the faculty classified by the university authorities as "indispensable". He was conscripted and sent to fight in Dalmatia where he served in the army, between 1914 and 1918, as an Artillery Officer. By the start of 1918 he had been redeployed to the "Dolomites front".

=== German University of Prague ===
During 1918, as both his fortieth birthday and the end of the disastrous war drew near, Hirsch secured a transfer to the army reserve, thereby enabling him to resume his university career. That year he accepted an ordinary (full) professorship at the German University of Prague. Traditionally the University of Prague had been predominantly German speaking, but that had started to change after 1848. By 1918 there were, in effect, two Universities of Prague, both of which had become hotbeds of uncompromising nationalism grounded in ethnic and linguistic difference and at least half a century of intensifying social polarisation. The German University of Prague that offered Hirsch his first full professorship in 1918 was one product of these developments. The situation was not without its practical complexities and contradictions. Hans Hirsch was acutely aware both of these and of the anguished political context in which, following the launch of an independent Czechoslovak Republic, the university operated during his eight-year tenure as a History Professor German at Prague.

At Prague he emerged as a keen backer of his student Josef Pfitzner, an opinionated young man whose nationalist convictions would later overflow into National Socialism. The two shared a number of underlying assumptions on Germanness and related subjects, on which they would continue to correspond till at least 1939.

In 1922 Hirsch received the offer of a professorship at Berlin, filling the vacancy created by the sudden death the previous year of his fellow Austrian, Michael Tangl. He turned it down, however. Remaining at German University of Prague, he sided with "völkisch" colleagues in calling for the university to be relocated to a German-speaking city in Czechoslovakia: Liberec in the extreme north of Bohemia was a favoured alternative, but the move was never made. (According to one set of estimates the proportion of Prague citizens giving German as their first language had declined from 33% to just under 9% between 1857 and 1900.) It was during this period that Hirsch established his credentials as a "Volkstumsforscher" (loosely, "folklore researcher") and a specialist on the so-called "Sudeten Germans". In 1921 his professorship in history was redefined as a professorship in medieval history and historical studies support topics. He also took his turn in terms of administrative responsibilities, serving during 1923/24 as the dean for the entire Philosophy Faculty.

=== University of Vienna ===
In 1926 Hirsch returned to his "alma mater", the University of Vienna, now as an ordinary (full) professor, taking over the teaching chair in medieval history that had become available through the retirement from it of Emil von Ottenthal, who at this stage remained involved with the university in other respects. In 1929 he added to his portfolio of responsibilities, taking over from Oswald Redlich as head of the "Österreichische Institut für Geschichtsforschung" ("Austrian Institute for History Research" - as it was known at that time). He would remain in the post till his death in 1940. During those eleven years the job, which placed him at the interface between historical scholarship and post-democratic politics, became increasingly challenging. He served a term during 1936/37 as Philosophy Faculty Dean, following through in 1939 with a year as University pro-rector. Between 1928 and 1935 he was a member of the "Zentraldirecktion" (loosely, "central directorate" ) of "Monumenta Germaniae Historica" and head of its "Vienna Diplomata" department, for which he had worked before the First World War. He continued to be engaged with the project during a process of growing politicisation - in respect of which he was not always quiescent - till shortly before his death in 1940.

Following his return to Vienna, Hirsch also continued to work on his own research. His approach remained scrupulously grounded in source documentation, never straying very far from it. The first project after 1926 involved teaming up with his professorial predecessor, Emil von Ottenthal. Together they worked on a volume of "The records of Emperor Lothar III and Empress Richenza" which was published in 1927. Re-printed editions were produced in 1957 and 2011. After this he returned to similar work on the "Diplomata" (original source documents) of Lothar's "anti-king", Konrad III.

In the context of his appointment as university pro-rector in 1939, Hirsch applied for party membership. Austria had been integrated into a newly enlarged German state in March 1938, and under the Hitler government it would have been unthinkable senior members of the university not to be party members. However, in August 1940, when he died, Hirsch's application for party membership still had not been processed. Although he had welcomed the German invasion back in March 1938, according to at least one source he had thereafter quickly became disillusioned with the new political situation.

During his later years Hitsch acquired the habit of undertaking regular health cures at Carlsbad, from which he would return suitably refreshed and reinvigorated. During 1939 or 1940 the healing properties of the health resort ceased to be of any obvious benefit, however: his condition rapidly deteriorated. On 20 August 1940 Hans Hirsch died of cancer at Vienna, aged 61.

== Works ==
In his lectures and other teaching activities, Hirsch was a consistent exponent of the "Greater Germany" solution. The debate had evolved during the nineteenth century as part of the move towards German unification. The division was between "Greater Germany" advocates for some form of closer political union across aome or all of entire region in which German language and culture predominated, and those who recognised the binary nature of German-speaking central Europe, whereby it was impossible to see how even those regions with German majorities in the already disintegrating Austrian empire would take instructions from Berlin, while northern Germany in general and Prussia in particular had set themselves in increasingly implacable opposition to domination from Vienna since at least as far back as 1740. The argument had shifted as the numerical preponderance and political dominance of German speakers had diminished in response to major population shifts in much of the Austrian empire during the closing decades of the nineteenth century, followed by the collapse of the empire in 1918. In this context it was easy for Hirsch to view the 1938 annexation of residual Austria into Germany in positive terms. The difficulty that arose for many life-long "Greater Germany" advocates in Catholic Austria was that integration into Austria meant subordination to Berlin, in a traditionally Protestant version of Germany which since 1933 had been governed according to the precepts of Adolf Hitler. In a response to a question on a university questionnaire, in 1938 Hirsch described himself as a "sponsoring member of the SS" (ein "Förderndes Mitglied der SS"). This meant supporting the government-backed SS paramilitaries by paying a membership subscription, but avoiding active participation in their activities, on grounds of age, infirmity or other cause(s). Although his reference to this membership is frequently cited, there is little indication that Hirsch ever discussed his relationship with Nazi paramilitarism, so it becomes hard to know whether the answer on the questionnaire was anything more than an attempt to preserve and/or advance his career at the university. The initial euphoria which greeted the German invasion in 1938 quickly gave way to disillusionment for Hirsch. He discovered that he had little in common with National Socialism, and he was deeply sceptical over the launch of another major European war. The way in which he had robustly backed a Jewish student in January 1938 when antisemitic members of the university faculty had attempted to block the man's Habilitation degree indicated that he had no sympathy for Hitlerite race hatred.

Hirsch's principal research focus was on the monastic foundations of the eleventh and twelfth centuries. A number of his students went on to achieve significant eminence as medievalists in their own right. These included Heinrich Appelt, Heinrich Fichtenau, Wilfried Krallert, Gerhart B. Ladner, Hans Sturmberger, Hermann Wiesflecker and Paul Zinsmaier. He was particularly supportive of Otto Brunner, whose precocious abilities he spotted early on, and to whom he became something of a mentor.

Hans Hirsch produced a number of the books over the years. Eighty years after his death, some are of more significance than others. Nevertheless, his documents-based approach and his avoidance of too much conscious interpretation gives his scholarship a lasting usefulness untrammelled any excess of unfashionable theorizing. Of particular interest is "Die Klosterimmunität seit dem Investiturstreit, Untersuchungen zur Verfassungsgeschichte des deutschen Reiches und der deutschen Kirche" ("The Monastic Community since the Investiture Struggles: Investigations on the Constitutional History of German statehood and the German Church"), first published in 1913, and re-issued on a number of occasions subsequently. Similarly important was "Die hohe Gerichtsbarkeit im deutschen Mittelalter" (loosely, "High Jurisdiction in the German Middle Ages"), first published in 1922 and re-issued in an expanded version in 1958, incorporating a substantial epilogue from Theodor Mayer. Both these books are written with an astonishing mastery of sources and with a sureness of touch in the application of the modalities and tools of document research, in respect of which Hirsch was something of a pioneer.

== Academic memberships and other marks of recognition ==
- In 1931 Hans Hirsch became a full member ("wirkliche Mitglied") of the Vienna-based "Österreichische Akademie der Wissenschaften" (Austrian Academy of Sciences and Humanities / ÖAW), becoming secretary of its "Philosophy-History Class" in 1938.
- In 1934 Hirsch was given charge of recently launched Vienna-based South-East German Research Group, dedicated to researching folklore issues and folk history across the region. The philosophy of the group was based on traditionalist nationalist and conservative ideas about history and politics. The objective was to provide sound intellectual and research-based underpinnings for reassuring concepts of Germanism in Austria and surrounding German-speaking regions. Although the ideas on which the research group was predicated dated back to the nineteenth century, there was a strong overlap with National Socialist identity theories which would acquire a toxic racist overlay in the aftermath of the holocaust.
- During the middle 1930s he was also a member of the so-called Spann Circle, created by admirers of the populist-universalist philosopher-sociologist Othmar Spann. In 1935 Hirsch contributed articles to the movement's monthly journal Ständisches Leben. Although the National Socialists viewed the independently minded admirers of Othmar Spann with sustained suspicion, the two movements shared much common ground in terms of their populist philosophical underpinnings.
- In 1936 Hans Hirsch was elected to a corresponding membership of the Berlin-based Prussian Academy of Sciences and Humanities.
- In 1938 he received an honorary doctorate from the (German) University of Prague.
- After Hirsch died in 1940 the "Büdingergasse" (street) in Vienna-Währing (Vienna 18) was renamed as the "Hans-Hirsch-Gasse". After 1945, with that part of Vienna in the American occupation zone, the name change was reversed, however. Ten years later, the death of Stalin having opened the way for what commentators came to identify as the Khrushchev Thaw, a sudden change of approach from inside the Kremlin triggered an end to the military occupation of Vienna in 1955. That same year the old "Donaufelder Friedhof" (cemetery), having been repurposed as a small city park, was renamed as the "Hans-Hirsch-Park".
