= Heinrich Ritter von Zeissberg =

Austrian historian

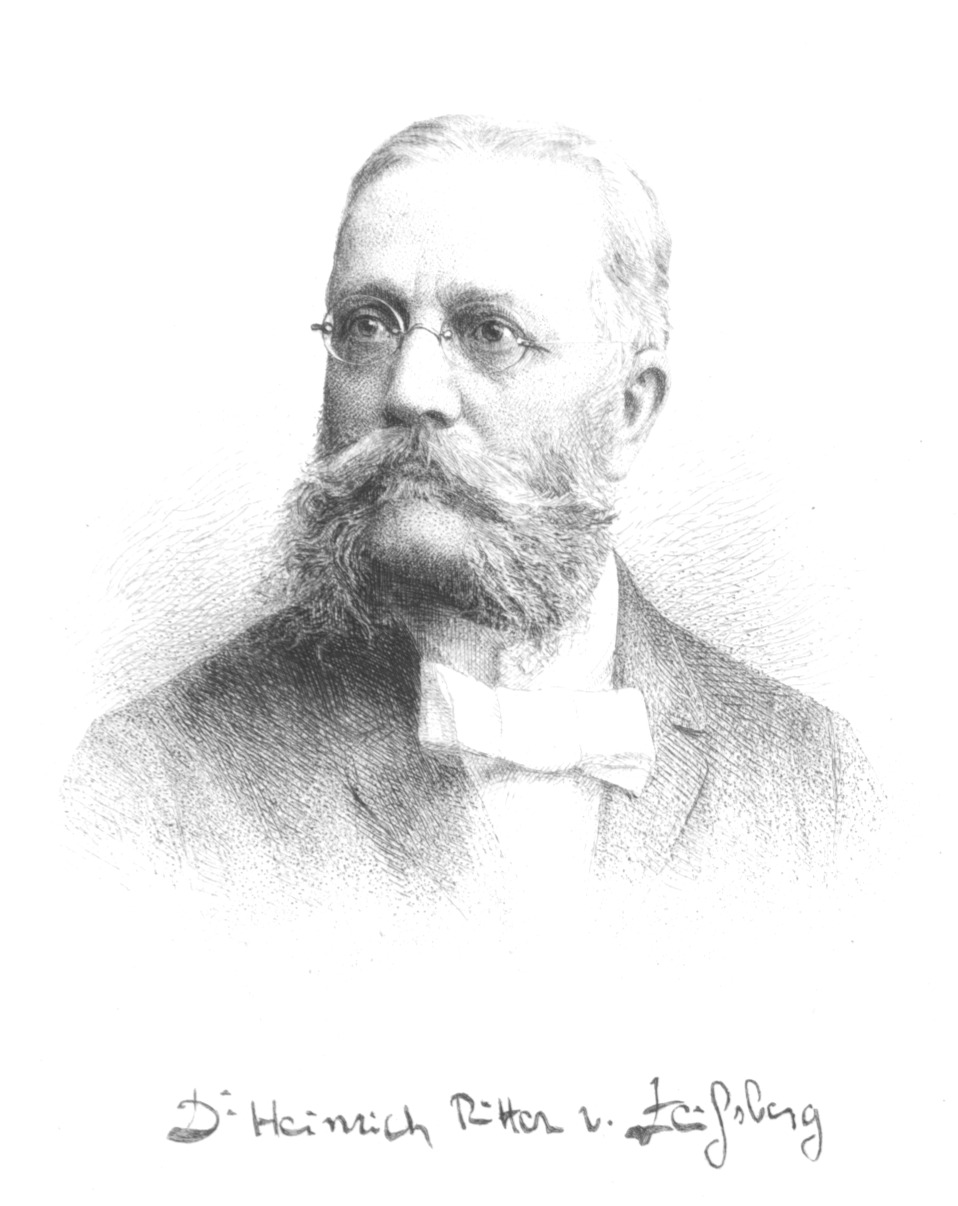
Heinrich von Zeissberg

Heinrich Ritter von Zeissberg (8 July 1839, in Vienna – 27 May 1899) was an Austrian historian.

== Biography ==
Zeissberg studied history at the university of Vienna, receiving his PhD in 1862. In 1865, became a professor of history at the university of Lemberg, and in 1871 relocated as a professor to Innsbruck. In 1872, he was appointed professor at the university of Vienna, and here he was a tutor of history to the crown prince Rudolph. In 1892, he was named director of the Vienna institute for historical research, and in 1896 director of the imperial court library at Vienna. He resigned his professorial chair at Vienna in 1897.

== Works ==
Zeissberg's writings deal mainly with the history of Austria and of Poland, such as:

- Arno, erster Erzbischof van Salzburg (Vienna, 1863); Arno, the first Archbishop of Salzburg.
- Miseco I. (Mieczysław) der erste christliche beherrscher der Polen (1867); Mieszko I, the first Christian ruler of Poland.
- Die Kriege Kaiser Heinrichs II. mit Herzog Boleslaw I. von Polen (Vienna, 1868); The wars of Emperor Henry II with Duke Bolesław I of Poland.
- Die polnische Geschichtsschreibung des Mittelalters (Leipzig, 1873); Polish historiography of the Middle Ages.
- Rudolf von Habsburg und der österreichische Staatsgedanke (Vienna, 1882); Rudolf of Habsburg and the Austrian national idea.
- Über das Rechtsverfahren Rudolfs von Habsburg gegen Ottokar von Böhmen (Vienna, 1887) – On the litigation of Rudolf von Habsburg against Ottokar of Bohemia.
- Der österreichische Erbfolgestreit nach dem Tode des Königs Ladislaus Posthumus, 1457-58 (Vienna, 1879) – The Austrian succession dispute after the death of King Ladislaus the Posthumous.

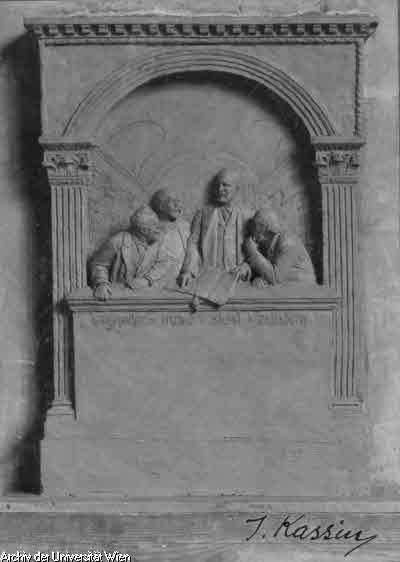
Group monument; Theodor von Sickel, Alfons Huber, Engelbert Mühlbacher and Heinrich Ritter von Zeissberg at the Arkadenhof of Vienna University

Dealing with more recent times he wrote:

- Zur deutschen Kaiserpolitik Oesterreichs: ein Beitrag zur Geschichte des Revolutionsjahres 1795 (Vienna, 1899) – German imperial policy regarding Austria; a contribution to the history of the revolutionary year 1795.
- Zwei Jahre belgischer Geschichte 1791-92 (Vienna, 1891) – Two years of Belgian history, 1791-92.
- Belgien unter der Generalstatthalterschaft Erzherzog Karls 1793-94 (Vienna, 1893–94) – Belgium under the General Staff of Archduke Karl, 1793-94.
- Erzherzog Karl von Oesterreich. Lebensbild (Vienna, 1895) – Archduke Charles of Austria, biography.
- Franz Josef I. (Vienna, 1888) – On Franz Josef I.

He edited three volumes of the Quellen zur Geschichte der Deutschen Kaiserpolitik Oesterreichs während der französischen Revolutionskriege 1790-1801 (Vienna, 1882-1885, 1890). He was the author of 61 biographies in the Allgemeine Deutsche Biographie.
