= Emil von Ottenthal =

Austrian historian and archivist (1855–1931)

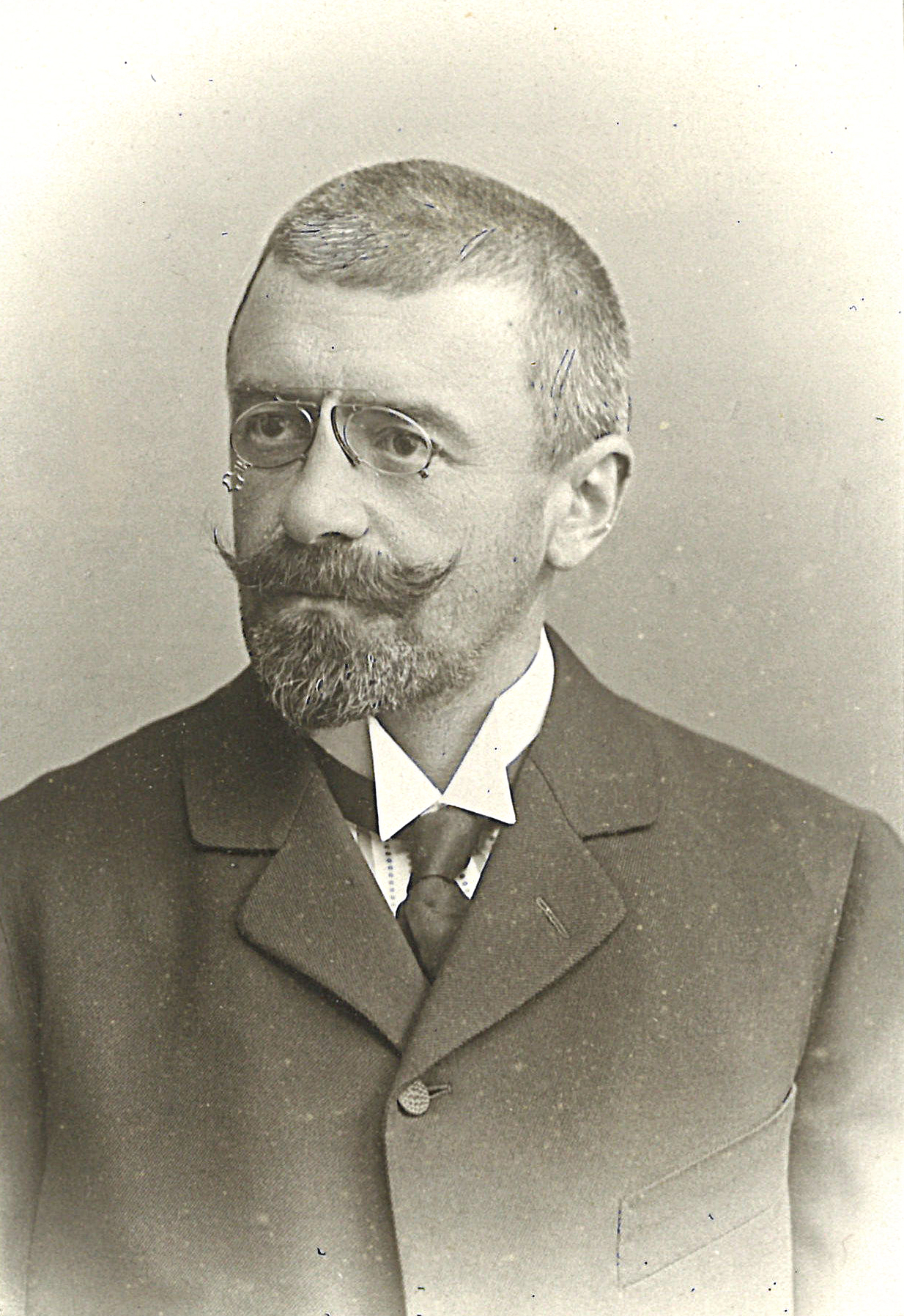

Emil von Ottenthal (15 June 1855, in Sand in Taufers – 5 February 1931, in Vienna) was an Austrian historian and archivist.

He studied history under Alfons Huber at the University of Innsbruck and with Theodor von Sickel at the Institut für Österreichische Geschichtsforschung (Institute for Austrian Historical Research) in Vienna. In 1880 he obtained his habilitation for history at Innsbruck, and from 1882 was associated with the Austrian Historical Institute in Rome. From 1888 to 1912, with Oswald Redlich, he published the Archiv-Berichte aus Tirol ("Archive Reports of Tyrol").

In 1889 he became an associate professor at the University of Innsbruck, where in 1893 he attained a full professorship. In 1904 he succeeded Engelbert Mühlbacher as professor and director of the Institute for Austrian Historical Research in Vienna. From 1904 to 1926 he was a member of the central management of Monumenta Germaniae Historica.

== Selected works ==
- Regulae Cancellariae apostolicae. Die päpstlichen Kanzleiregeln von Johannes XXII. bis Nicolaus V., 1888 – Regulae Cancellariae apostolicae; the papal chancellory of John XXII to Nicholas V.
- Die Regesten des Kaiserreichs unter den Herrschern aus dem Sächsischen Hause 919–1024 (by Johann Friedrich Böhmer, new edition by Ottenthal; 6 parts, 1893–) – The Regesta of the Empire among the rulers of Saxony, 919–1024.
- Das K.K. Institut für Österreichische Geschichtsforschung 1854–1904 (1904) – The Royal Institute of Austrian history research in 1854–1904.
- Das Memoirenhafte in Geschichtsquellen des früheren Mittelalters, 1905 – On history sources of the earlier Middle Ages.
- Die gefälschten Magdeburger Diplome und Melchior Goldast, 1919 – The counterfeit Magdeburg document and Melchior Goldast.
