= Michael Tangl =

- Born: 1864; Wolfsberg, Carinthia
- Died: 1921; Klagenfurt
- Education: University of Vienna, Austrian Historical Institute in Rome
- Occupation(s): Scholar of history and diplomatics
- Known for: Monumenta Germaniae Historica editor, Boniface correspondence edition
- Notable work: Edition of the Boniface correspondence

Michael Tangl (1864 – 1921, in Klagenfurt) was an Austrian scholar of history and diplomatics, and one of the main editors of the Monumenta Germaniae Historica, for whom he published the correspondence of Saint Boniface, an edition still used by scholars and considered the definitive edition.

== Career ==
Tangl was born in Wolfsberg, Carinthia, on 28 May 1864, to a family of bakers. He attended school at Saint Paul's Abbey, Lavanttal, near Wolfsberg, started at age 11; he later said that the wealth of deeds in the abbey's library became an inspiration for him. He studied history and classical philology at the University of Vienna from 1881 to 1884, and until 1887 at the Institut für Österreichische Geschichtsforschung, which prepared students for work in archives, libraries, and museums. There he met two historians who would be of great importance later in his life: Theodor von Sickel and Engelbert Mühlbacher. Until 1891 he studied at the Austrian Historical Institutein Rome, on the recommendation of von Sickel; his work there led to the publication, in 1894, of Die päpstlichen Kanzleiordnungen von 1200–1500. Tangl was aided in the compilation of this work by his discovery of a 1560 book in the Barberini library that recorded events and transactions of the Apostolic Chancery going back to the Avignon papacy.

He gained his doctorate in 1889, and his habilitation in 1892 under Mühlbacher, in the history of the Middle Ages and auxiliary sciences of history. He worked as a civil servant for the archives of the Austrian ministry of the Interior, and later that of Finances; during this time he published his only essay on a more recent topic, the Italian writer Silvio Pellico.

Mühlbacher helped him acquire a position with the Monumenta Germaniae Historica, in the Diplomata section. In 1892 he began editing the deeds of the early Carolingians, and published, after the death of Mühlbacher, the first volume in 1906. From 1903 on he worked on the republication of the Placita and took charge of the Epistolae. He was elected a member of the board of the MGH in 1902. After 1911 he was editor of the MGH's journal, Deutsches Archiv (then called Neues Archiv). During World War 1 and until 1919 he directed the MGH.

In 1895 he was appointed at the University of Marburg, at their newly founded program for Auxiliary sciences of history. In 1897 he was appointed at the Friedrich-Wilhelms-Universität in Berlin, where from 1900 until his death he was professor of Auxiliary sciences of history and medieval history. He became a corresponding member of the Bavarian Academy of Sciences, and in 1918 was selected as member of the Prussian Academy of Sciences.

== Notable Students ==
- Richard G. Salomon

== Notable work ==
Tangl published two articles in Neues Archiv on the Boniface correspondence, articles considered "foundational" by Theodor Schieffer. They include an important discussion of the so-called Zachary exemption, a forgery in the Boniface correspondence that supported the Fulda Abbey's status as exempt from the local diocese. Of particular importance was his settling of the death date of Boniface, which he determined was 754, not 755. His edition of the Boniface correspondence, the last of three critical editions (he was preceded by Philipp Jaffé and Ernst Dümmler), was published in 1916 by the MGH and is considered the definitive edition.
