= Mühlbacher =

Mühlbacher is a surname. Notable people with the surname include:

- Engelbert Mühlbacher (1843–1903), Austrian historian
- Gerhard Mühlbacher (born 1975), Austrian luger
