= Johann Janssen =

Johann Janssen may refer to

- Johann Voldemar Jannsen, Estonian poet
- Johannes Janssen, German historian
