= Wilhelm Erben =

Austrian historian (1864–1933)

Wilhelm Erben (3 December 1864, in Salzburg – 7 April 1933, in Graz) was an Austrian historian, known for his work in the field of auxiliary sciences of history and his studies involving the history of medieval warfare.

He studied history at the University of Vienna, and from 1885 studied with Theodor von Sickel at the Institut für Österreichische Geschichtsforschung (Institute for Austrian Historical Research) in Vienna. From 1888 to 1891 he was an employee of the Monumenta Germaniae historica, and afterwards, served as curator at the Imperial Army Museum in Vienna. In 1901 he qualified as a lecturer, and two years later was named professor of medieval history and historical auxiliary sciences at the University of Innsbruck. From 1917 up until his death in 1933, he taught classes as a professor at the University of Graz. In 1915 he became a member of the Vienna Academy of Sciences.

== Selected works ==
- Die Kaiser- und Königsurkunden des Mittelalters in Deutschland, Frankreich und Italien, 1907 – The imperial and royal charters of the Middle Ages in Germany, France and Italy.
- Urkundenlehre (3 volumes, 1907–11; with Ludwig Schmitz-Kallenberg and Oswald Redlich).
- Ein oberpfälzisches Register aus der Zeit Kaiser Ludwigs des Bayern, 1908 – An Upper Palatinate register from the time of King Ludwig of Bavaria.
- Quellenstudien aus dem Historischen Seminar der Universität Innsbruck, 1909 – Source studies from the Historical Seminar of the University of Innsbruck.
- Die Schlacht bei Mühldorf, 28. September, 1322; historisch-geographisch und rechtsgeschichtlich untersucht, 1923 – The Battle of Mühldorf; historical-geographical and legal history examined.
- Das Salzburger Fragment der Sächsischen Weltchronik, 1924 – Salzburg fragment of the Saxon Chronicle.
- Kriegsgeschichte des Mittelalters, 1929 – War history of the Middle Ages.
- Rombilder auf kaiserlichen und päpstlichen Siegeln des Mittelalters, 1931 – Roman images of imperial and papal seals of the Middle Ages.
