= Ludwig Schmitz-Kallenberg =

German archivist and historian

Ludwig Schmitz-Kallenberg (10 June 1867, in Rheydt – 22 April 1937, in Münster) was a German archivist and historian of Westphalia.

He studied history at the University of Freiburg, Münster Academy and Leipzig University, receiving his doctorate in 1891. In 1893 he took a study trip to Rome via a scholarship from the Görres Society, and from 1896 worked as an archivist for the Historical Commission for Westphalia. In 1899 he became a lecturer at Münster, where in 1918 he was named an honorary full professor. From 1921 to 1932 he served as director of the state archives in Münster.

He was an editor of journals Westfalen (1909–25) and Westfälische Zeitschrift (1923–25), and from 1915 to 1926 edited the Geschichtliche Darstellungen und Quellen ("Historical Representations and Sources").

== Selected works ==
- Geschichte der Herrschaft Rheydt, 1897 – History of the dominion of Rheydt.
- Inventare der nichtstaatlichen Archive des Kreises Ahaus, 1899 – Inventories of the non-state archives of Ahaus.
- Urkunden des fürstlich Salm-Salm'schen Archives in Anholt, des fürstlich Salm-Horstmar'schen Archives in Coesfeld und der herzoglich Croy'schen Domänenadministration in Dülmen (1902–04) – Documents of the princely Salm-Salm archives in Anholt, the princely Salm-Horstmar archives in Coesfeld and the ducal Croy domain administration in Dülmen.
- Die Lehre von den Papsturkunden, 1906 – The doctrine of papal documents.
- Urkundenlehre (3 volumes, 1907–11, with Wilhelm Erben and Oswald Redlich).
- Monasticon Westfaliae. Verzeichnis der im Gebiet der Provinz Westfalen bis zum Jahre 1815 gegründeten Stifter, Klöster und sonstigen Ordensniederlassungen, 1909 – Monasticon Westfalia. List of donors, monasteries and other religious settlements founded in the province of Westphalia up to 1815.
- Historiographie und Quellen der deutschen Geschichte bis 1500 (with Max Jansen, 1914) – Historiography and sources of German history up until 1500.
- Inventare der nichtstaatlichen Archive des Kreises Büren, 1915 – Inventories of the non-state archives of the district of Büren.
- Monumenta Budicensia: Quellen zur Geschichte des Augustiner-Chorherrenstiftes Bödeken in Westfalen, 1815 – Monumenta Budicensia: Sources of the history of the Augustinian monastery Bödeken in Westphalia.
