= Ludwig von Pastor =

German historian and diplomat (1854–1928)

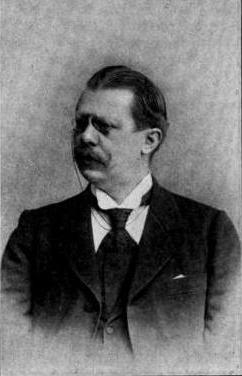
- Born: 31 January 1854; Aachen, Kingdom of Prussia
- Died: 30 September 1928 (aged 74); Innsbruck, Austria

Ludwig Pastor, ennobled as Ludwig von Pastor, Freiherr von Campersfelden (31 January 1854 – 30 September 1928), was a German historian and diplomat for Austria. He became one of the most important Catholic historians of his time and is most notable for his History of the Popes. He was raised to the nobility by the Emperor Franz Joseph I in 1908 and was nominated for the Nobel Prize in Literature six times.

== Early life ==
Born in Aachen to a Lutheran father and a Catholic mother, Pastor was converted to Catholicism at ten, after his father's death. He attended a Frankfurt gymnasium, where his teacher was Johannes Janssen who introduced him to historical studies.

Pastor studied in 1875 at Leuven, in 1875/76 at Bonn, where he became a member of the student corporation Arminia, and in 1877/78 at Vienna. Pastor taught at the University of Innsbruck, first as a lecturer (1881–87), then as professor of modern history (1887). His dissertation was titled "Die kirchlichen Reunionsbestrebungen während der Regierung Karls V" (The Church's Attempts at Reunion During the Reign of Charles V). Pastor edited his mentor Janssen's eight-volume Geschichte des deutschen Volkes (History of the German People) and published it from 1893 to 1926.

== History of the Popes ==
Janssen had made him aware of Leopold von Ranke's History of the Popes. This determined the field he would take for his own, becoming in a sense a Catholic anti-Ranke. His approach was that the apparent shortcomings of the Papacy reflected flaws of their times. Pastor consulted archives throughout Catholic Europe and, during his first trip to Italy in 1881, his seriousness ensured the patronage of Pope Leo XIII, who opened to him the contents of the Vatican Library, which had previously been held unavailable to scholars.

He was granted privileged access to the Secret Vatican Archives, and his history, largely based on hitherto unavailable original documents, superseded all previous histories of the popes in the period he covered, which runs from the Avignon Papacy of 1305 to Napoleon's entrance in Rome, 1799. He also investigated the archives of public and private libraries and archives in Italy and Europe, demonstrating an extraordinary capacity for work and rare sagacity in discovering interesting documents.

Pastor decided to begin his work with the papacy of Pope Clement V (1305–1314) and the onset of the Avignon Papacy, so that he could concentrate his research on surviving documents. His dispassionate and frank papal history concentrated on individual popes rather than on the developments of papal institutions. Pastor's tomes span the pontificates of 56 popes, from Clement V to Pius VI.

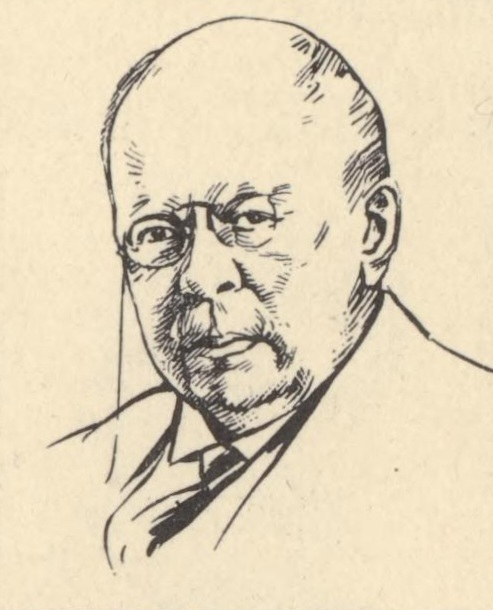
Ludwig von Pastor

He combined painstaking scholarship with erudition. The result of his research was his Geschichte der Päpste seit dem Ausgang des Mittelalters in sixteen volumes. The opus magnum was subsequently translated into English and published as History of the Popes From the Close of the Middle Ages.

Pastor began his work in 1886 and wrote throughout the pontificates of Leo XIII, Pius X, Benedict XV and Pius XI, publishing fifteen volumes. The 16th and final volume was published posthumously in 1930. The English translations were published between 1899 and 1953.

== Academic memberships, honours and offices ==
In 1901, Pastor was appointed director of the Austrian Historical Institute in Rome, which he headed (with an interruption 1914-1919) until his death.

He also was a member of the Emperor Franz-Joseph Academy in Prague, corresponding member of the Società Colombaria in Florence, member of the Papal Academy in Rome, of the Academy of Cracow and the Académie Royale d'Archéologie de Belgique in Antwerp. He achieved an honorary membership of the Academy of St Luke in Rome, an honorary doctorate at the University of Leuven, and membership in the historical section of the Görres Society.

He received the positions of Commander of the Papal Order of St Sylvester Pope and Martyr, of Knight of the Papal Order of Pius IX, of Commander of the Austrian Order of Franz Joseph and of the Royal Italian Order of Saints Maurice and Lazarus.

Emperor Francis Joseph I elevated him to the nobility in 1908 and gave him the title Freiherr von Campersfelden in 1916. In 1921 he was appointed the Republic of Austria's ambassador to the Holy See, and died in Innsbruck in 1928.

== Works ==
All forty volumes of The History of the Popes are available from the Internet Archive. Volumes I to VI are translated and edited by Frederick Ignatius Antrobus, volumes VII to XXIV by Ralph Francis Kerr, volumes XXV to XXXIV by Ernest Graf and volumes XXXV to LX by E. F. Peeler. The publishers vary and include K. Paul, Trench Trübner, & Co., Routledge, and K. Paul.

- Vol. I, 1305–1447, Popes at Avignon, The Schism, Councils of Pisa and Constance, Martin V and Eugenius IV
- Vol. II, 1447–1458, Nicholas V and Calixtus III
- Vol. III, 1447–1464, Pius II
- Vol. IV, 1464–1483, Paul II and Sixtus IV
- Vol. V, 1484–1497, Innocent VIII and Alexander VI
- Vol. VI, 1492–1511, Alexander VI, Pius III and Julius II
- Vol. VII, 1513–1521, Leo X (Book I)
- Vol. VIII, 1513–1521, Leo X (Book II)
- Vol. IX, 1522–1527, Adrian VI and Clement VII
- Vol. X, 1523–1534, Clement VII
- Vol. XI, 1534–1540, Paul III
- Vol. XII, 1534–1549, Paul III
- Vol. XIII, 1550–1555, Julius III
- Vol. XIV, 1555–1559, Marcellus II and Paul IV
- Vol. XV, 1559–1565, Pius IV
- Vol. XVI, 1559–1565, Pius IV
- Vol. XVII, 1566–1572, Pius V
- Vol. XVIII, 1566–1572, Pius V
- Vol. XIX, 1572–1585, Gregory XIII
- Vol. XX, 1572–1585, Gregory XIII
- Vol. XXI, 1585–1590, Sixtus V
- Vol. XXII, 1585–1591, Sixtus V, Urban VII, Gregory XIV and Innocent IX
- Vol. XXIII, 1592–1605, Clement VIII
- Vol. XXIV, 1592–1605, Clement VIII
- Vol. XXV, 1605–1621, Leo XI and Paul V
- Vol. XXVI, 1605–1621, Leo XI and Paul V
- Vol. XXVII, 1621–1644, Gregory XV and Urban VIII
- Vol. XXVIII, 1621–1644, Gregory XV and Urban VIII
- Vol. XXIX, 1621–1644, Gregory XV and Urban VIII
- Vol. XXX, 1644–1655, Innocent X
- Vol. XXXI, 1655–1676, Alexander VII, Clement IX and Clement X
- Vol. XXXII, 1676–1700, Innocent XI, Alexander VIII and Innocent XII
- Vol. XXXIII, 1700–1721, Clement XI
- Vol. XXXIV, 1721–1740, Innocent XIII, Benedict XIII and Clement XII
- Vol. XXXV, 1740–1758, Benedict XIV
- Vol. XXXVI, 1740–1769, Benedict XIV and Clement XIII
- Vol. XXXVII, 1758–1769, Clement XIII
- Vol. XXXVIII, 1769–1774, Clement XIV
- Vol. XXXIX, 1775–1799, Pius VI
- Vol. XL, 1775–1799, Pius VI

== Sources ==
- Thomas Brechenmacher (1993). "Ludwig von Pastor". In Bautz, Traugott (ed.). Biographisch-Bibliographisches Kirchenlexikon (BBKL) (in German). Vol. 6. Herzberg: Bautz. cols. 1588–1594. ISBN 3-88309-044-1.
