= Heinrich Fichtenau =

Austrian historian

Heinrich von Fichtenau (10 December 1912 – 15 June 2000) was an Austrian medievalist best known for his studies of medieval diplomatics, social, and intellectual history. He spent his academic career at the University of Vienna and from 1962 to 1983 served as director of the Institut für österreichische Geschichtsforschung (Institute for Austrian Historical Research). Many of Fichtenau's books were translated into English and he remains one of the few Austrian medievalists of the postwar period whose work has enjoyed a broad and influential reception in Anglophone scholarship.

== Education and early career ==
Born in Linz to a prosperous family, Fichtenau entered the University of Vienna in 1931 and completed the archivists' training course at the Institut für österreichische Geschichtsforschung in 1935. He subsequently continued on for his doctoral degree, awarded in 1940, under the Institute's director Hans Hirsch, and wrote his Habilitation thesis while serving on the Eastern Front in the German Wehrmacht during World War II. Published in 1946 as Mensch und Schrift im Mittelalter (Man and Writing in the Middle Ages), this Habilitation established Fichtenau's reputation as an authority on the social and cultural contexts of literacy and documentary practice in the Middle Ages. In 1949, Fichtenau published a short treatment of the Carolingian Empire which drew sharp criticism from German academics, but found more favorable reception in the U.S. and Great Britain (The Carolingian Empire: The Age of Charlemagne, abridged trans. Peter Munz, 1957). Fichtenau attempted to demythologize Charlemagne's achievements and draw out many of the contradictions and fundamental instabilities within the empire he created. Written in post-war Vienna, the book was a frank, if understandably cynical, take on historical narratives of the early Middle Ages which celebrated power, conquest, and the idealized image of a pan-European polity. Fichtenau was appointed Extraordinary (Associate) Professor of History at Vienna in 1950, and received a promotion to a full professorial chair (Ordinarius) in 1963, at which time he also assumed the director's position at the Institute.

== Scholarship and influence ==
Fichtenau taught primarily in the field of ancillary historical sciences (Historische Hilfswissenschaften), a set of disciplines that encompasses the technical study of medieval historical sources, such as palaeography, diplomatics, epigraphy, sigillography, and heraldry. Much of his published work in German relates to understanding how the forms of documentation and writing in the Middle Ages reflect social and cultural change. Between 1950 and 1955 Fichtenau, along with his colleague Erich Zöllner, published the diplomas of the House of Babenberg. In a series of studies entitled Arenga: Spätantike und Mittelalter im Spiegel von Urkundenformeln (Cologne & Vienna, 1957), Fichtenau traced shifts in the self-representation of medieval rulers in the rhetoric of the introductory clauses of their diplomas. In 1971, he published Das Urkundenwesen in Österreich vom 8. bis zum frühen 13. Jahrhundert (Cologne & Vienna), a still unsurpassed analysis of the various forms, and—more importantly—social and cultural significance, of medieval charters from institutions and collections in southern Germany and Austria.

Fichtenau's landmark monographic study, Lebensordnungen des 10. Jahrhunderts, appeared in 1984 and was later translated into English by the American medievalist Patrick J. Geary as Living in the Tenth Century: Mentalities and Social Orders (Chicago & London, 1991). In it, Fichtenau explored the political, religious and social value systems of a period that many (including historians) still characterize as primitive, violent, and mostly unknown—the so-called "Dark Ages." In focusing on perceptions of order, rather than traditional political narratives, Fichtenau's work resonated more with the interdisciplinary Anglo-French approaches to medieval social history than the traditions of legal and institutional history characteristic of much German-language historiography at the time.

== Retirement and Later Work ==
In 1983, Fichtenau retired and passed the directorship of the Viennese Institute on to his pupil and protégé, Herwig Wolfram. In retirement throughout the 80's and 90's, he remained an active scholar. In 1991, he produced a wide-ranging intellectual/religious study of the concomitant emergence of heretical movements and scholasticism in medieval Europe after the eleventh century, translated into English as Heretics and Scholars in the High Middle Ages, 1000-1200 (Philadelphia, 1998). He fell suddenly ill in the spring of 2000 and died several days later at the age of 88. Fichtenau is buried at his family's crypt in the town of Baden, near Vienna.

== Decorations and awards ==
- 1965: Grand Decoration of Honour in Gold for Services to the Republic of Austria
- 1979: Wilhelm Hartel Prize
- 1986: Cultural Prize of the Province of Upper Austria
- 1989: Austrian Decoration for Science and Art
