= Richard G. Salomon =

American historian

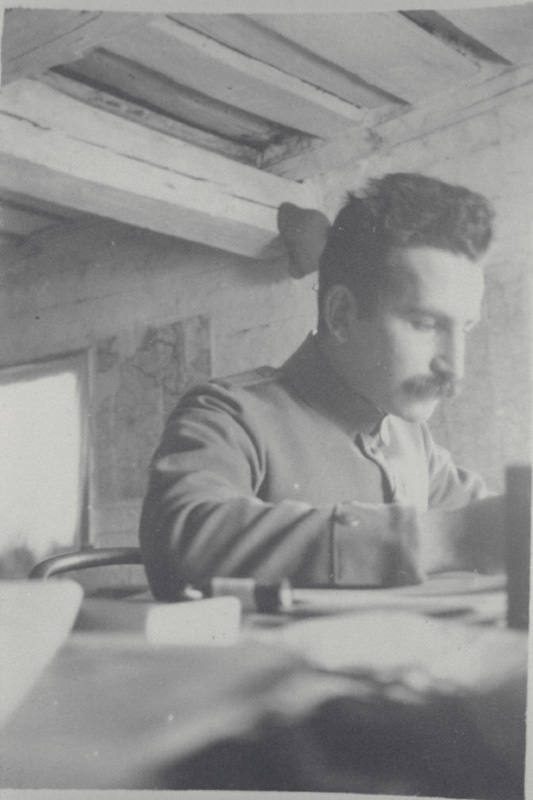
- Richard G. Salomon, 1915
- Born: April 22, 1884; Berlin, Germany
- Died: February 3, 1966 (aged 81); Mount Vernon, Ohio
- Education: University of Berlin
- Occupations: Historian of eastern European medieval history and of the Episcopal Church in the United States
- Organizations: Kenyon College; University of Hamburg; Bexley Hall

Richard Georg Salomon (April 22, 1884 – February 3, 1966) was an historian of eastern European medieval history and historian of the Episcopal Church in the United States, who taught at the University of Hamburg in Germany and at Kenyon College and its Episcopal Church seminary Bexley Hall in Ohio.

== Early life and education ==
The eldest child of Georg Anton Salomon (1849–1916), a medical doctor and lecturer at the University of Berlin, and his wife Anna Salomon née Herfort (1856–1931), Richard Salomon was raised in Berlin, where he attended the Königliche Friedrich-Wilhelms-Gymnasium. Becoming interested in the history of religion, he was baptized at the evangelical Jerusalem Church in Berlin at the age of 18 in 1902. Going on to the University of Berlin, Salomon studied eastern European history under Theodor Schiemann (1847–1921), Byzantine history under Karl Krumbacher (1856–1909), the history of medieval law under Karl Zeurner (1849–1914), and Latin paleography under Michael Tangl (1864–1921), under whom he completed his doctoral dissertation in February 1907: Studien zur normannisch-italischen Diplomatik. Salomon's maternal uncle, Philip A. Herfort, was a noted violinist and violist.

== Academic career ==
In March 1907, Salomon was appointed to the editorial staff of the Monumenta Germaniae Historica and in the following year began to teach courses on Russian and Byzantine history. In the spring of 1914, he was appointed professor of the history and culture of Russia at the Colonial Institute in Hamburg. Before Salomon could take up his duties in 1914, he was drafted into the Imperial German Army. He was assigned duties in the Quartermaster Corps and served in Belgium, Poland, and Lithuania before he was released from military duties two years later in the spring of 1916.

Returning to the Colonial Institute in Hamburg, Salomon took up his position and began teaching the history of the Balkans and taught a course on Russian war literature. In May 1919, the Colonial Institute was created into the University of Hamburg and, with the founding of the university Salomon became University Professor of Eastern European History and Culture as well as Director of the Eastern European Seminar. In 1923–24, he served additionally as Dean of the Faculty of Philosophy.

In 1920, when the wealthy Hamburg art historian Aby Warburg founded the Kulturwissenschaftliche Bibliothek Warburg, the forerunner of the Warburg Institute of London, Salomon was appointed to its board of scholarly advisors. Through this connection, Salomon first encountered the young art historian Erwin Panofsky, who became a close friend.

On 7 April 1933, the new National Socialist government of Germany issued its directive to forcefully retire "undesirable" university academics of Jewish origin. Among the six named at Hamburg were Panofsky and Salomon, who was formally removed from his academic post in March 1934. At this point, Salomon looked for other employment and first began his work to edit the 14th century "Avignon Documents" in the Hamburg archives, detailing the legal process of Hamburg against the Papal Curia in Avignon, a work that continued to the end of his life. At the same time, the Emergency Committee in Aid of Displaced German Scholars in New York and the Academic Assistance Council in London were becoming aware of his situation. Through these connections, possibilities arose for Salomon to go to the United States. Erwin Panofsky, by then at the Institute for Advanced Study in Princeton, was instrumental in helping Salomon obtain a lecture tour in the spring of 1936 and to deliver courses of lectures on Latin Paleography at the Warburg Institute in London in 1936 and 1937. After Salomon's return to Hamburg, Frank Aydelotte, the president of Swarthmore College offered him a rotating position to lecture at the University of Pennsylvania, Bryn Mawr College, and Swarthmore College in the United States for 1937-38 and this was renewed for 1938–39.

In 1939, President Gordon Keith Chalmers of Kenyon College offered him a permanent position to teach medieval history in the undergraduate college and to be Cooke Professor of Church History at the college's Episcopal Church seminary, Bexley Hall. He also served as historian of the Episcopal Diocese of Ohio. Becoming an American citizen, he was placed in charge of preparing at Kenyon College a U.S. Army Specialized Training Unit in Area and Language for service in Germany in 1943–44, and, in 1944–45, he worked in Washington, D.C. in the Middle Europe section of the Office of Strategic Services.

In 1962, Salomon retired at the age of 78 from undergraduate teaching, but retained his professorship in the seminary. At that time, Kenyon College awarded him an honorary Doctor of Humane Letters degree. The citation summarized his career by noting: "Your lively and extensive knowledge, your warm interest in the arts, your love for research, and your obvious devotion to the life of scholarship--all these combined with what you are made you one of the chiefest ornaments of our faculty."

== Published works ==
- Johannis porta de Annoniaco Liber de coronatione Karoli IV. Imperatoris Ed. Ricardus Salomon. Monumenta Germaniae historica Scriptores rerum germanicarum ...: 2; 3. Hannoverae, Lipsiae: Hahn, 1913.
- Das Weltbild eines avignonesischen Klerikers. Leipzig: B.G. Teubner, 1930.
- Opicinus de Canistris; Weltbild und Bekenntnisse eines avignonesischen Klerikers des 14, Jahrhunderts von R. G. Salomon mit beiträgen von A. Heimann und R. Krautheimer. London, The Warburg Institute [Leipzig, Druck von B. G. Teubner] 1936
- Die Avignonesischen Akten des Hamburger Staatsarchivs: Ein Arbeitsbericht u. e. Anleitg zur weiteren Bearbeitg Hamburg : Ackermann & Wulff, 1937.
- Orthodoxy, ecumenical movement, and Anglicanism : the Moscow Conference of 1948 [S.l: s.n.], 1957.
- Highlights of Church History: Early and Medieval. Philadelphia: Church Historical Society, 1948.
- The Episcopate on the Carey Case; New Sources from the Chase Collection at Kenyon College. Austin, Texas: Church Historical Society, 1949.
- Addresses at the Twenty-Seventh Synod of the Fifth Province of the Protestant Episcopal Church in the United States of America: Kenyon College, Gambler, Ohio, September 11–13, 1950. by Richard S. M. Emrich, Gordon Keith Chalmers, and Richard Salomon. Gambier, Ohio: [s.n.], 1950.
- British Legislation and American Episcopacy. [s.n.], 1951.
- Mother church, daughter church, sister church: the relations of the Protestant Episcopal Church and the Church of England in the 19th century Reprinted from the Historical magazine of the Protestant Episcopal Church, December, 1952
- Early days of the Church in Ohio Reprinted from Church life, volume 57, number 5, June 1953.
- A newly discovered manuscript of Opicinus de Canistris; a preliminary report. Reprinted from the Journal of the Warburg and Courtauld Institutes. Volume XVI, numbers 1–2, 1953, pp. 45–57.
- The case of the Episcopal churches in the United States considered by William H. White (1748–1836) edited with an introduction by R.G. Salomon. Publication no. 39. Philadelphia: Church Historical Society, 1954.
- St. John's Parish, Worthington, and the beginnings of the Episcopal Church in Ohio. Offprint reprinted from The Ohio Historical Quarterly, volume 64, number 1, January 1955.
- Philander Chase in Ohio. Builders for Christ. New York: National Council, [195?].
- Chase in Ohio and Illinois. [S.l: s.n,] 1960.
- Die Korrespondenz zwischen dem Hamburger Rat und seinen Vertretern an der päpstlichen Kurie in Avignon 1337 bis 1359. Bearb. von Richard Salomon. Veröffentlichungen aus dem Staatsarchiv der Freien und Hansestadt Hamburg, Bd.9, T.1, ca. 1966.
