= Alfons Huber =

Austrian historian

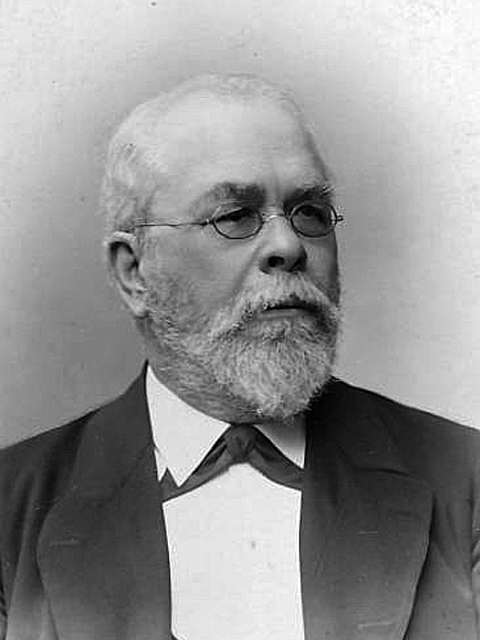
Alfons Huber

Alfons Huber (born 14 October 1834 in Fügen, Zillerthal (Tyrol); died 23 November 1898 in Vienna) was an Austrian historian.

== Life ==
After finishing his gymnasium studies in Hall and Innsbruck, he studied history under Julius von Ficker at the University of Innsbruck (1855–59). While still young, he had become interested in history from Joseph Annegarn's Allgemeine Weltgeschichte. In 1859, he was appointed lecturer of history at Innsbruck, where he became professor in 1863, corresponding member of the Academy of Sciences in 1867, full member in 1872, and in 1887 professor at the University of Vienna, succeeding Ottokar Lorenz.

Under Ficker, he had learned critical accuracy, purity of style, and the importance of strictly impartial investigation. He had also acquired a comprehensive knowledge of diplomatics. In politics, he was a liberal, but deeply religious.

== Works ==
His earliest writings, Ueber die Entstehungszeit der österreichischen Freiheitsbriefe (Vienna, 1860) and Die Waldstädte Uri, Schwyz und Unterwalden bis zur festen Begründung ihrer Eidgenossenschaft (Innsbruck, 1861), deal with territorial history. For the celebration of the five-hundredth anniversary of the union of Austria and the Tyrol, he wrote, in 1864, Geschichte der Vereinigung Tirols mit Oesterreich and, as a sequel, Geschichte Herzogs Rudolf IV. von Oesterreich (Innsbruck, 1865). After the death of Johann Friedrich Böhmer, the first publisher of the German imperial "Regesta", who had provided Huber with the means of making several scientific journeys, Ficker, on whom had fallen the responsibility of completing Böhmer's work, called upon his former pupil to co-operate with him. Huber accepted the task and finished the fourth volume of the Fontes rerum Germanicarum, containing the most important records of the fourteenth century. He then worked on the "Regesta" of Charles IV, which appeared between 1874 and 1877 with an introduction on the imperial diplomacy of the later Middle Ages. This was followed by a supplement published in 1889. His magnum opus is a Geschichte Oesterreichs ("History of Austria") in five volumes (1885–96), brought up to 1648. The last years of Huber's life were devoted to research on the constitutional and administrative history of Austria, the result of which appeared in his Oesterreichische Reichsgeschichte (Vienna, 1895).

== Family ==
He is the great-grandfather of German medical researcher Tobias B. Huber.
