= Philip A. Herfort =

German violinist, violist and orchestra leader

Philip Adolph Herfort
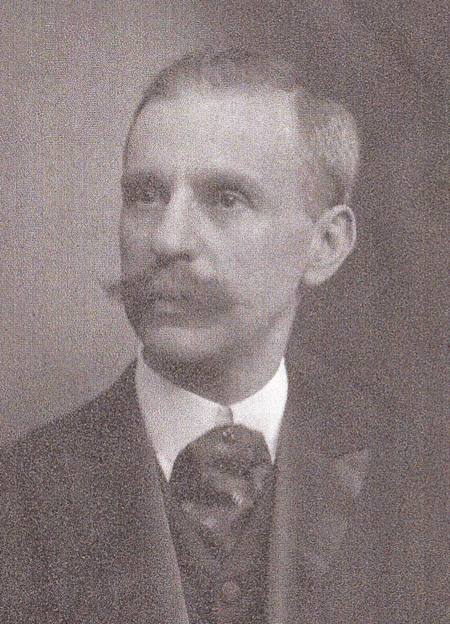
- Philip Adolph Herfort
- Born: November 28, 1851; Berlin, Kingdom of Prussia (now Germany)
- Died: March 24, 1921 (aged 69); Brooklyn, New York
- Education: Royal Academy of Music, Berlin
- Occupations: Classical Violinist & Violist; Orchestra Leader
- Organizations: New York Philharmonic Society; New York Symphony Orchestra; Metropolitan Opera; Venth-Kronold String Quartet

Philip Adolph Herfort (November 28, 1851 – March 24, 1921) was a German violinist, violist and orchestra leader.

== Early life and education ==
He was born in Berlin, Kingdom of Prussia (now Germany), on November 28, 1851, to Jewish parents, Adolph (Aron) Herfort (1818–1900) and Clara Maass (1830–1907). Herfort studied music under the Hungarian violinist and composer Joseph Joachim at the Royal Academy of Music (Königlich Akademischen Hochschule für ausübende Tonkunst) in Berlin—now a part of the Berlin University of the Arts.

== Career ==
At the age of 24, Herfort left his native Germany aboard the SS Donau, arriving at the port of New York City on August 5, 1876. Shortly thereafter, he performed in Theodore Thomas’s orchestra, playing violin solos, at the Centennial Exposition in Philadelphia. By the next year, Herfort settled in New York City, where he married a fellow German immigrant, Antonie Theodore Johanne Lupprian, on December 15, 1877. They went on to have four children: Sophie, Paul, Walter, and Gunther.

Later on, Herfort was first violin and viola of the New York Philharmonic Society (now the New York Philharmonic) and the New York Symphony Orchestra. For many years, he was the orchestra leader of the Metropolitan Opera. He was also the director of the vaudeville theater Koster and Bial's Music Hall and the Long Beach Hotel, at its beginning and at the height of its popularity. He was the former musical director for E. H. Sothern and Sarah Bernhardt Productions, and was a member of the Aschenbrödel Verein, a musical society. In addition, Herfort was a member of the Venth-Kronold String Quartet, founded and led by the musician Carl Venth, in which Herfort played viola.

At the age of 69, Philip Herfort died on March 24, 1921, in Brooklyn, New York, and is buried in Green-Wood Cemetery. His nephew was the noted historian Richard G. Salomon. In addition, Herfort's first cousin once removed Marie Weisbach was the wife of famed Berlin architect Ludwig Hoffmann.
