= Tobias Huber =

German nephrologist and internist (born 1971)

Tobias Huber (25 August 1971 in Waldkirch) is a German nephrologist and internist. He is a university professor and Director and Chairman of the III. Department of Medicine at the University Medical Center Hamburg-Eppendorf.

== Biography ==
Huber studied human medicine in Freiburg, Vienna and Tampa from 1992 until 1999. Following his promotion at the Institute of Physiology in Freiburg, he was medical assistant at the nephrologists unit of the University Hospital Freiburg. From 2003 until 2006 Huber was receiving an Emmy Noether scholarship of the Deutsche Forschungsgemeinschaft and worked as Postdoctoral Fellow at the Department of Immunology and Pathology at Washington University in St. Louis. After his habilitation in 2007, Huber was certified as a specialist in internal medicine and became group leader of an Emmy Noether research group in Freiburg. In 2012 Huber had been elected as Heisenberg Fellow and since 2013 he has been holding a Heisenberg professorship for Medicine and Nephrology at the University Medical Center Freiburg. From 2015- 2017 Huber was Vice Chair of the Department of Medicine IV, Chief of the Division of Chronic Kidney Disease at the University Medical Center Freiburg and furthermore, Co-Director of the Center of Systems Biology (ZBSA). Since April 2017 he is the Director and Chairman of the III. Department of Medicine at the University Medical Center Hamburg-Eppendorf. Huber is a Fellow of the American Society of Nephrology (FASN) and a member of the American Society for Clinical Investigation a member of the Association of American Physicians and a member of the German National Academy of Sciences – Leopoldina.

== Scientific contribution ==
Huber's research focus is to understand the complex signalling networks that regulate the development, maintenance and disease progression of the kidney. His team identified several molecular mechanisms important for renal development, maintenance, ageing and disease of the kidney. More recently, his team made novel discoveries regarding the tropism and organ injury caused by SARS-CoV-2 (Puelles et al. NEJM 2020, Braun et al., LANCET 2020, Gross et al., LANCET, 2020).
