= Heinrich Wilhelm Grauert =

German historian

Heinrich Wilhelm Grauert (25 March 1804, in Amsterdam – 10 January 1852, in Vienna) was a Dutch born, German historian and classical philologist.

From 1821 he studied history and philology at the University of Bonn, where he was a pupil of Karl Friedrich Heinrich and August Ferdinand Naeke. At Bonn, he came under the influence of historian Barthold Georg Niebuhr, of whom he worked as a tutor to his son Marcus. In 1825 he received his doctorate with a dissertation on the fabulist Aesop, titled De Aesopo et fabulis Aesopicis. In 1827 he was appointed associate professor of history and classical studies at the Academy of Münster, where in 1836 he attained a full professorship of history. In 1850 he became a professor of history and director of the newly revised historical seminary at the University of Vienna, but died soon afterwards on 10 January 1852, aged 47.

== Selected works ==
- Historische und philologische Analekten, 1833 – Historical and philological analects.
- Christina Königinn von Schweden und ihr Hof (2 volumes, 1837–42) – Queen Christina of Sweden and her court.
- Ueber die Metrik der Römischen Epiker, 1840 – On the metrics of the Roman epic.
- Die Thronentsagung des Königs Johann Casimir von Polen und die Wahl seines Nachfolgers, 1851 – The abdication of King John Casimir of Poland and the election of his successor.

He was also the author of several articles in the journal Rheinisches Museum für Philologie, Geschichte und griechische Philosophie.
