= Johannes Janssen =

German Catholic priest and historian (1829 – 1891)

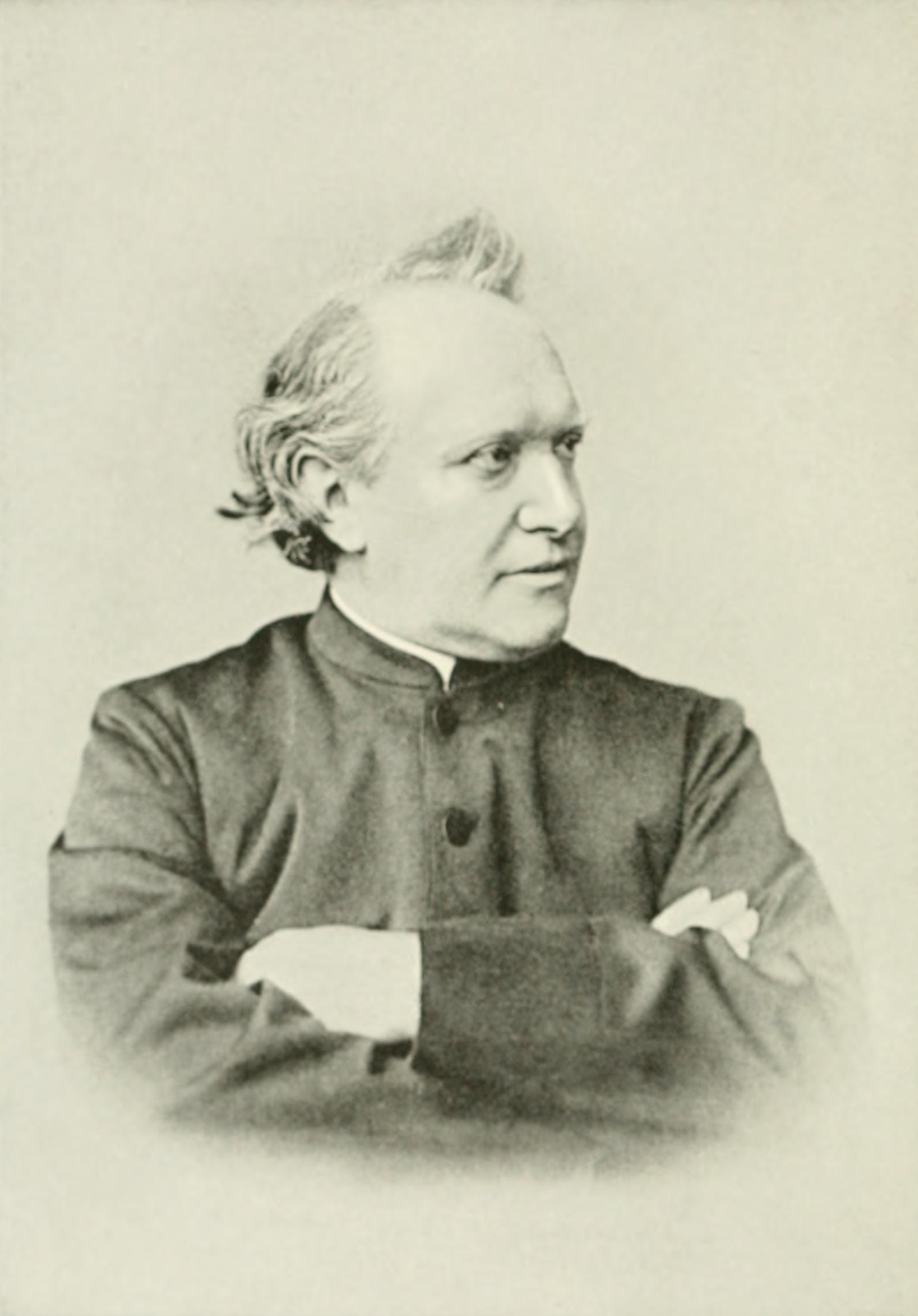
Johannes Janssen.

Johannes Janssen (Xanten, 10 April 1829 – Frankfurt-am-Main, 24 December 1891) was a German Catholic priest and historian. He wrote an eight volume History of the German People, quoting many original sources.

== Life ==
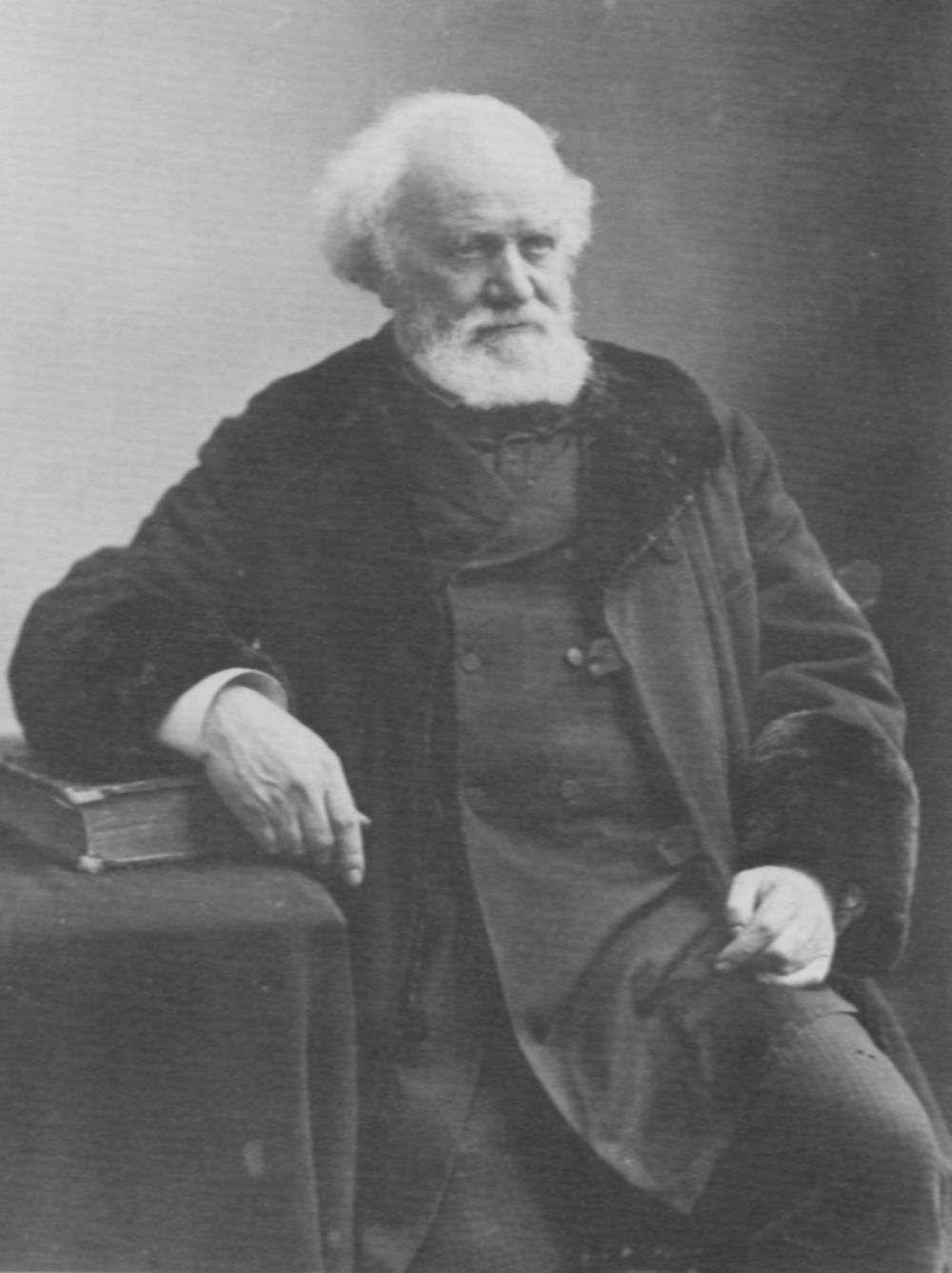
Johannes Janssen (1829-1891)

After graduating from the Rektoratsschule in Xanten (today's Stiftsgymnasium), he was educated at the universities of Münster, Leuven, Bonn and Berlin. It was while he was at the University of Louvain that he resolved to make the study of history his principal work. He became a teacher of history at the Gymnasium in Frankfurt-am-Main, a position he held up to the time of his death. Historian Ludwig von Pastor was one of his students.

Janssen had long been interested in entering the priesthood, but the delicate state of his health postponed that for some time. He was ordained priest at Limburg in March 1860. Not satisfied with attending to the ordinary duties of the classroom, Janssen devoted his spare time to historical research, the results of which were embodied in many learned volumes. In 1864-65 he spent several months in Rome, where he consulted the archives of the Vatican on matters relating to the Thirty Years' War.

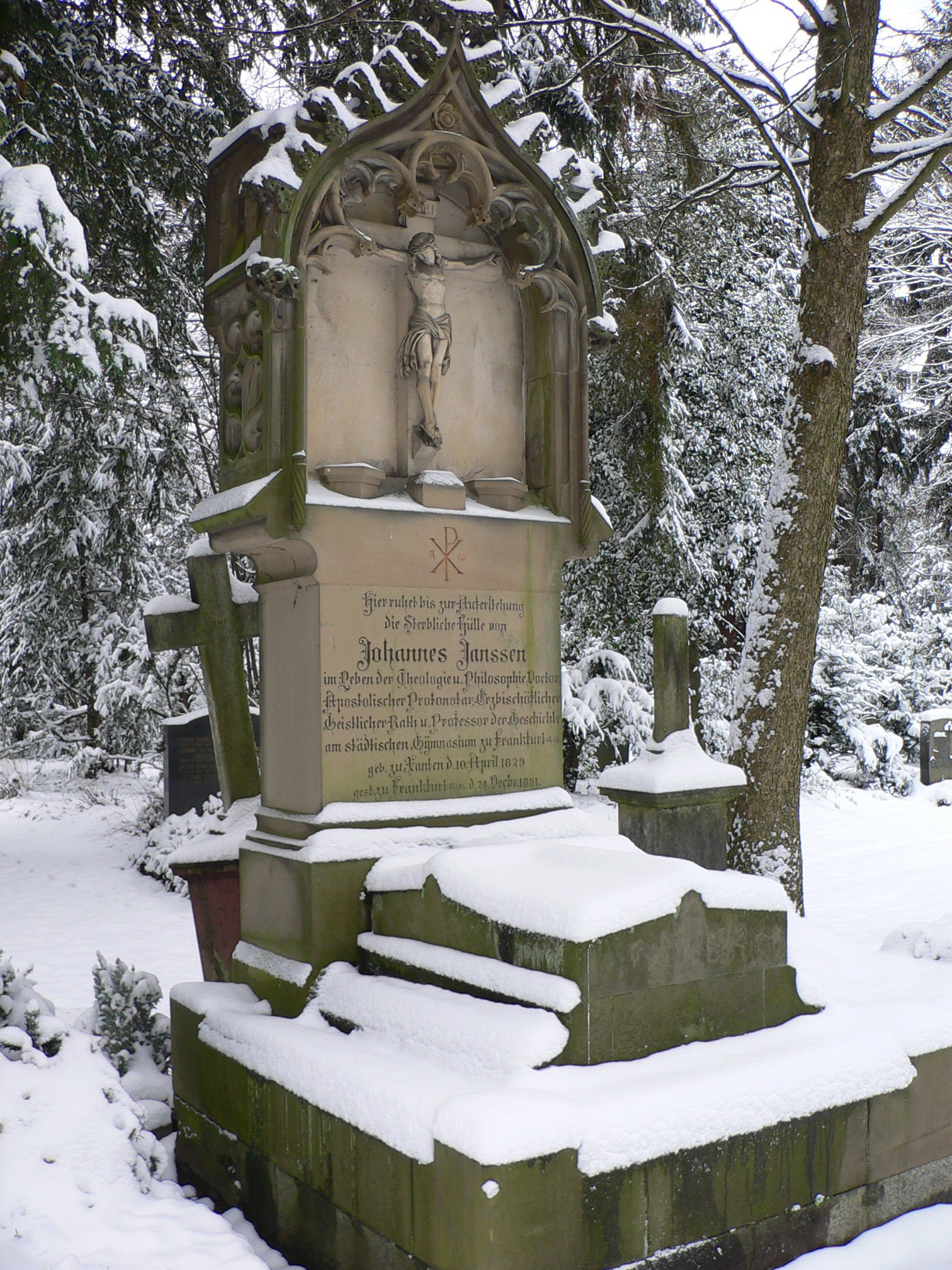
Janssen's grave, Hauptfriedhof

He became a member of the Prussian House of Deputies in 1875, joined the Centre party, and spent much time in Berlin. In 1880 he was made a domestic prelate to the pope and apostolic pronotary. He died at Frankfurt. Janssen was a stout champion of the Ultramontane party in the Roman Catholic Church. Janssen died in Frankfurt on Christmas Eve 1891. Wilhelm II, German Emperor sent a wreath for the coffin. An asylum for the poor and abandoned children of Frankfort, erected in 1894 in the town of Oberursel, owed its existence largely to his efforts.

== Works ==
His first work was a Latin biography of Abbot Wibald, which appeared in a revised form in German (1854). In 1856 he published a volume of historical documents relating to the Diocese of Munster, Die Geschichtsquellen des Bisthums Münster, 3 vols. In the essay "Zur Genesis der ersten Theilung Polens" (1865) he explained the circumstances under which the former Kingdom of Poland was robbed of part of its dominions by neighbouring countries.

He wrote a biography in three volumes in 1868 of Johann Friedrich Böhmer, a man whom he considered as his teacher and guide. In 1876-77 appeared a two volume biography of the writer and poet Count Friedrich Leopold zu Stolberg.

His great work is his Geschichte des deutschen Volkes seit dem Ausgang des Mittelalters (8 vols., Freiburg, 1878–1894), first suggested by Böhmer in 1853. He argues against Luther, Zwingli and the other Protestant reformers, and claimed that Protestantism was responsible for the general unrest in Germany during the 16th and 17th centuries. The author's conclusions led to some controversy, and Janssen wrote An meine Kritiker (Freiburg, 1882) and Ein zweites Wort an meine Kritiker (Freiburg, 1883) in reply to the Janssens Geschichte des deutschen Volkes (Munich, 1883) of Max Lenz, and other criticisms. A French historian quoted in the Revue des Deux Mondes said, "To get impatient with Janssen is easy: to prove that he is wrong, just the reverse."

The Geschichte, which has passed through numerous editions, has been continued and improved by Ludwig Pastor, and the greater part of it has been translated into English by M. A. Mitchell and A. M. Christie (London, 1896, fol.). Of his other works perhaps the most important are: the editing of Frankfurts Reichskorrespondenz, 1376–1519 (Freiburg, 1863–1872); and of the Leben, Briefe und kleinere Schriften of his friend JF Böhmer (Leipzig, 1868); a monograph, Schiller als Historiker (Freiburg, 1863); and Zeit- und Lebensbilder (Freiburg, 1875).

=== Works in English translation ===
- History of the German People at the close of the Middle Ages, Kegan Paul, Trench, Trübner & Co, Ltd. (1896-1910):
  - Vol. I: Popular Education and Science – Art and Popular Literature – Political Economy, 1896.
  - Vol. II. The Holy Roman Empire, 1896.
  - Vol III: The Revolution Party and its Proceedings – The Diet of Worms and the Progress of the Politico-Clerical Revolution, 1900.
  - Vol. IV: The Social Revolution, 1900.
  - Vol. V: Propagation and Systematising of the New Doctrines – Plan of War Against the Emperor – The League of Smalcald – The Zwinglian Religious Disturbance in Suabia – Fresh Overtures of Peace from the Emperor, 1903.
  - Vol. VI: The Smalcaldian War and Internal Disintegration Down to the So-Called Religious Peace of Nuremberg, 1912.
  - Vol. VII: General Conditions of the German People from the So-Called Religious Pacification of Augsburg in 1555 to the Proclamation of the Formula of Concord in 1580, 1905.
  - Vol. VIII: General Conditions of the German People from the So-Called Religious Pacification of Augsburg in 1555 to the Proclamation of the Formula of Concord in 1580 (Cont.), 1905.
  - Vol. IX: The Politico-Religious Revolution from the Proclamation of the Formula of Concord in 1580 up to the Year 1608, 1906.
  - Vol. X: Leading up to the Thirty Years' War, 1906.
  - Vol. XI: Art and Popular Literature to the Beginning of the Thirty Years' War, 1907.
  - Vol. XII: Art and Popular Literature to the Beginning of the Thirty Years' War, (Cont.), 1907.
  - Vol. XIII: Schools and Universities, Science, Learning and Culture Down to the Beginning of the Thirty Years' War, 1909.
  - Vol. XIV: Schools and Universities, Science, Learning and Culture Down to the Beginning of the Thirty Years' War (Cont.), 1909.
  - Vol. XV: Commerce and Capital – Private Life of Different Classes – Mendicancy and Poor Relief, 1910.
  - Vol. XVI: General Moral and Religious Corruption – Imperial Legislation Against Witchcraft – With Persecution from the Time of the Church Schism to the Last Third of the Sixteenth Century, 1910.
- Index Volume, Kegan Paul, Trench, Trübner & Co, Ltd., 1925.

== See also ==
- Karl Gotthard Lamprecht
- Ludwig von Pastor
- Leopold von Ranke

== Sources ==
- Bernhard Duhr (1930). "Johannes Janssem als Katholiseher Historiker," Der Katholische Gedanke, Vol. III, No. 3.
- Jedin, Hubert (1974). "Janssen, Johannes". In: Neue Deutsche Biographie. Berlin: Duncker & Humblot.
- Meister, Franz (1896). Erinnerung an Johannes Janssen. Frankfort: A. Foesser Nachf.
- Mooney, John A. (1887). "Professor Janssen and other Modern German Historians," The American Catholic Quarterly Review, Vol. XII, pp. 424–451.
- Mooney, John A. (1888). "Johannes Janssen, Germany's Great Historian," The American Catholic Quarterly Review, Vol. XIII, pp. 429–462.
- Pastor, Ludwig von (1893). Johannes Janssen. Freiburg: Herder.
- Pastor, Ludwig von (1905). "Janssen, Johannes". In: Allgemeine Deutsche Biographie. Leipzig: Duncker & Humblot, pp. 733–741.
- Schwann, Mathieu (1892). Johannes Janssen und die Geschichte der deutschen Reformation. München: C. Mehrlich.
- Thompson, James Westfall (1942). "Catholic Historians." In: A History of Historical Writing. The Macmillan Company, pp. 535–558.
- Wildermuth, Bernd (1990). "Johannes Janssen". In: Biographisch-Bibliographisches Kirchenlexikon. Hamm: Bautz.
