= Institut für Österreichische Geschichtsforschung =

History institution in Vienna, Austria

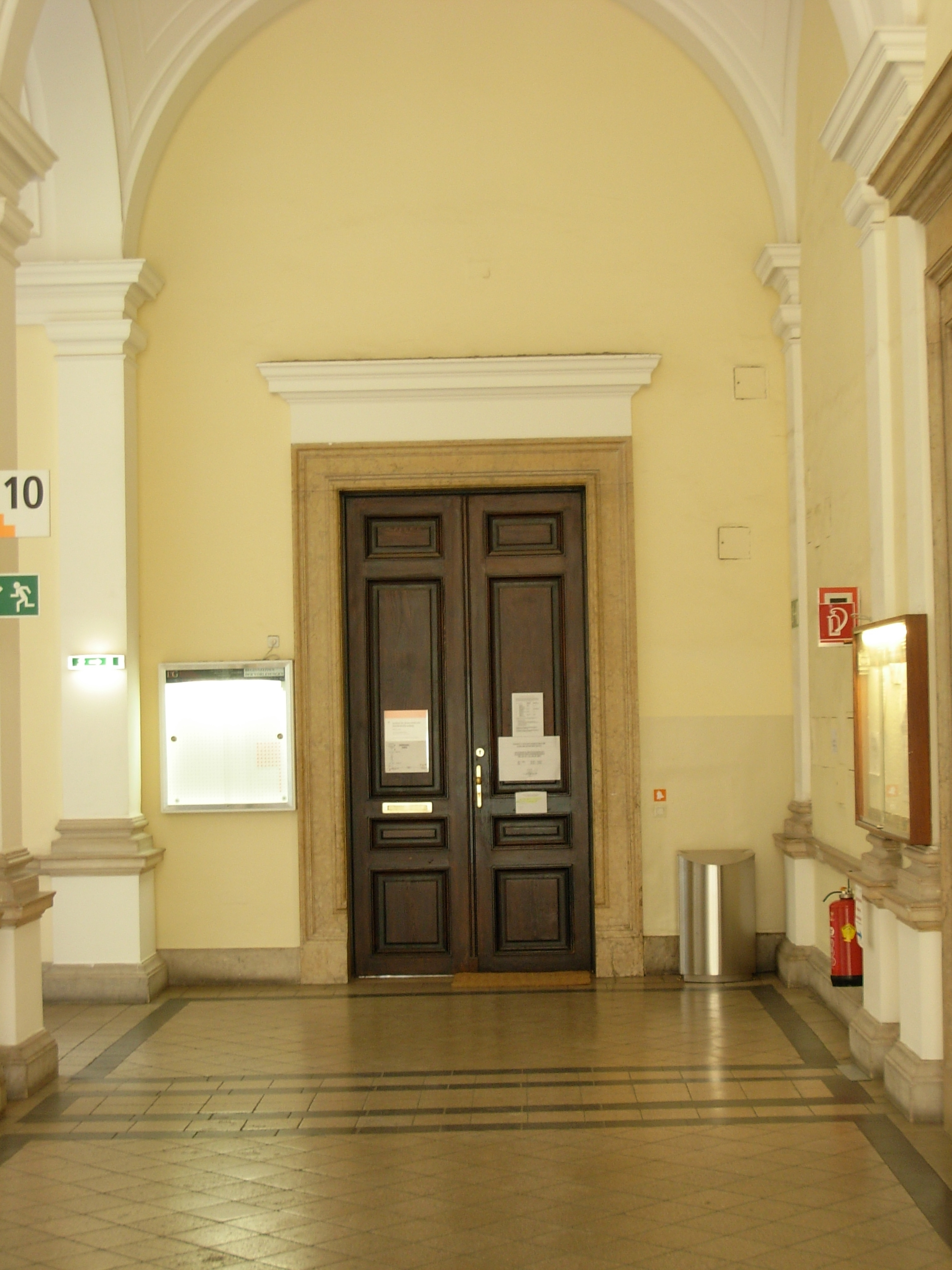
Entrance to the Institute for Austrian Historic Research in 2007.

The Institute for Austrian Historic Research (German: Institut für Österreichische Geschichtsforschung, acronym IÖG) is a history research institution in Vienna, Austria. Established in 1854, since 2016 it is part of the University of Vienna.

== Publications ==
Since 1880, the institute has published the journal Mitteilungen des Instituts für Österreichische Geschichtsforschung (MIÖG).

== Bibliography ==
- Alphons Lhotsky: Geschichte des Instituts für Österreichische Geschichtsforschung 1854–1954 (= Mitteilungen des Instituts für Österreichische Geschichtsforschung. Ergänzungsband 17). Böhlau, Graz / Köln 1954.
- Manfred Stoy: Das Österreichische Institut für Geschichtsforschung 1929–1945 (= Mitteilungen des Instituts für Österreichische Geschichtsforschung. Ergänzungsband 50). Oldenbourg, München 2007, ISBN 978-3-7029-0551-4.
- Karin Winter und Jakob Wührer: Der Kurs ist tot! Es lebe das Masterstudium! Ein Erfahrungsbericht zur archivwissenschaftlichen Ausbildung an der Universität Wien und dem Institut für Österreichischen Geschichtsforschung, in: Scrinium 66 (2012), S. 65–107 (Der Beitrag bringt als Anhang die jüngsten Entwicklungen in der Studienordnung des Masterstudiums).
- Ernst Zehetbauer: Geschichtsforschung und Archivwissenschaft. Das Institut für Österreichische Geschichtsforschung und die wissenschaftliche Ausbildung der Archivare in Österreich. tredition, Hamburg 2014, ISBN 978-3-8495-7660-8.
- Ernst Zehetbauer: Ganz neue Kleider. Achtes Kapitel zum Werk: Geschichtsforschung und Archivwissenschaft. Das Institut für Österreichische Geschichtsforschung und die wissenschaftliche Ausbildung der Archivare in Österreich. tredition, Hamburg 2017, ISBN 978-3-7439-2269-3.
