= Mitteilungen des Instituts für Österreichische Geschichtsforschung =

Austrian academic journal

Mitteilungen des Instituts für Österreichische Geschichtsforschung is an Austrian academic journal established in 1880 by the Institut für Österreichische Geschichtsforschung (Institute for Austrian historic research). Recent editors include Anton Scharer, Georg Scheibelreiter, and Andrea Sommerlechner.
