= Oswald Redlich =

Austrian historian and archivist

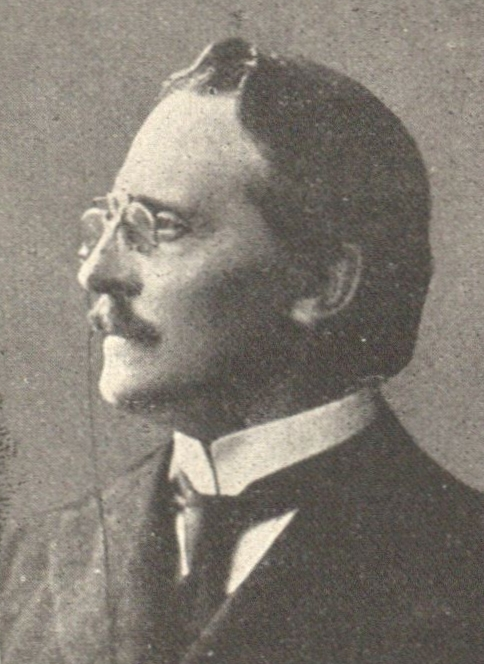
- Born: 17 September 1858; Innsbruck, Austrian Empire
- Died: 20 January 1944 (aged 85); Vienna, Nazi Germany
- Education: University of Innsbruck; Institute for Austrian Historical Research
- Scientific career
- Fields: Auxiliary sciences of history
- Workplaces: University of Vienna; Austrian Academy of Sciences; Monumenta Germaniae Historica; Bavarian Academy of Sciences

Oswald Redlich (17 September 1858, in Innsbruck – 20 January 1944, in Vienna) was an Austrian historian and archivist, known for contributions made in the field of auxiliary sciences of history.

== Biography ==
He studied history under Julius von Ficker at the University of Innsbruck (1876–79), then studied historical auxiliary sciences with Theodor von Sickel at the Institut für Österreichische Geschichtsforschung (Institute for Austrian Historical Research) in Vienna (1879–81). From 1881 to 1892 he worked as an archivist in Innsbruck, and in the meantime, obtained his habilitation for historical auxiliary sciences (1887). From 1888 to 1912, with Emil von Ottenthal, he published the Archiv-Berichte aus Tirol ("Archive Reports of Tyrol"). In 1893 he became an associate professor, and four years later was named a full professor of history and historical auxiliary sciences at the University of Vienna. In 1911/12 he served as university rector.

In 1899 he became a member of the Austrian Academy of Sciences, serving as its president from 1919 to 1938. From 1926 onward, he was head of the Institute for Austrian Historical Research. He was also a member of the central management of Monumenta Germaniae Historica and of the Historical Commission of the Bavarian Academy of Sciences.

On 17 September 1958 a commemorative stamp honoring the 100th anniversary of his birth was issued in Austria.

== Selected works ==
- Archiv-Berichte aus Tirol (with Emil von Ottenthal; 4 volumes, 1888–1912) – Archive reports from Tirol.
- Zur Geschichte der österreichischen Frage unter König Rudolf, 1893 – On the history of the Austrian question under King Rudolf I.
- Die Regesten des Kaiserreichs unter Rudolf, Adolf, Albrecht, Heinrich VII.: 1273–1313 (by Johann Friedrich Böhmer, new edition by Redlich, 1898) – The Regesta of the Empire under Rudolf, Adolf, Albrecht, Henry VII; 1273–1313.
- Rudolf von Habsburg: das Deutsche Reich nach dem Untergange des alten Kaisertums, 1903 – Rudolf von Habsburg; the German empire after the fall of the old empire.
- Schillers historische Schriften, 1906 – Friedrich Schiller's historical writings.
- Urkundenlehre (3 volumes, 1907–11; with Wilhelm Erben, Ludwig Schmitz-Kallenberg).
- Oesterreich-Ungarns Bestimmung, 1916 – Austria-Hungary destination.
- Geschichte Österreichs, 1921 – History of Austria.
- Das Werden einer Großmacht. Österreich von 1700 bis 1740 (7th edition, 1938) – Becoming a great power; Austria in 1700–1740.
