= End of World War II =

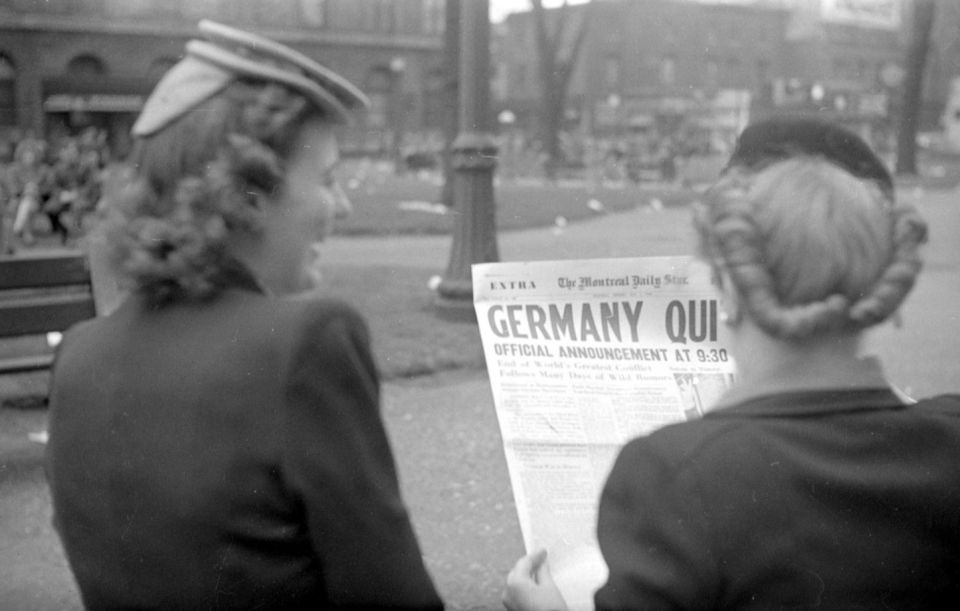
Two women reading a newspaper about Germany's surrender in Montreal on V.E. Day

End of World War II can refer to:

- End of World War II in Europe
- End of World War II in Asia
- Aftermath of World War II
