= Engelbert Mühlbacher =

Austrian historian

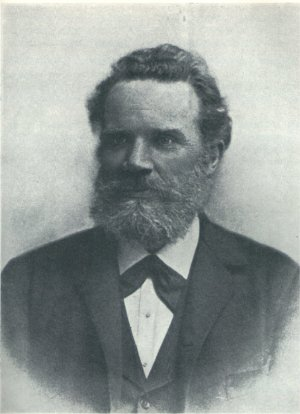
Engelbert Mühlbacher

Engelbert Mühlbacher (4 October 1843 – 17 July 1903) was an Austrian historian.

Born in Gresten, he received his classical education in Linz, Upper Austria being his family's home region. In 1862 he became a novice among the Austin Canons in Sankt Florian. After completing his theological studies there, he was ordained priest in 1867. As Alfred Ritter von Arneth relates in his memoirs, historical studies had been successfully cultivated at St. Florian's since Provost Arneth's time, and Mühlbacher was soon active in this domain. Among his writings are articles on St. Florian's Gerhoh von Reichersberg, and the literary productions of St. Florian's.

In 1872 he was studying history under Julius von Ficker in Innsbruck, where after two years he received the degree of Doctor of Philosophy. He then hastened to Vienna to finish his historical training under Theodor von Sickel's guidance. When Ficker entrusted the youthful scholar with the revision of the Carolingian period of Böhmer's "Regesta", he was directing him to a domain in which he was to do much work. In 1878 he was formally received as academical lecturer into the philosophical faculty of the University of Innsbruck, and between 1880 and 1889 published his edition of the imperial "Regesta" of the Carolingian period. As Oswald Redlich says, "the technique of compiling regesta received exemplary development at Mühlbacher's hands, and his work served as a model for the entire new edition of the imperial Regesta".

In 1892 Mühlbacher was entrusted with the editing of the Carolingian charters for the Monumenta Germaniæ Historica. At the same time it became necessary to bring out a new edition of his Carolingian "Regesta". The two works proved of mutual assistance. He was able to see only the first part of each work through the press, but left considerable material for the use of his successors. No other German scholar was so well qualified to write the Deutsche Geschichte unter den Karolingern, which appeared in 1896. After 1879 Mühlbacher edited the Mitteilungen des Instituts für österreichische Geschichtsforschung (Publications of the Institute for Austrian Historical Research). In 1881 he was appointed extraordinary, and in 1896 ordinary professor at Vienna. In 1895 Ficker turned over to him the management of the Regesta Imperii. He took in hand the arrangement of the Austrian State Archives, and the preparation of the more recent history of Austria. He was chosen an active member of the Imperial Academy of Sciences in Vienna.

When Mühlbacher died in Vienna at age 59 of pneumonia, he left the almost completed manuscript of his edition of the charters of Pepin the Short, Carloman I and Charlemagne. This volume was published posthumously in 1906 (Die Urkunden Pippins, Karlmanns und Karls des Großen, MGH Diplomata Karolinorum I, book in digital form) and is the authoritative edition of the charters of these three kings until today.
