= Johann Friedrich Böhmer =

German historian (1795–1863)

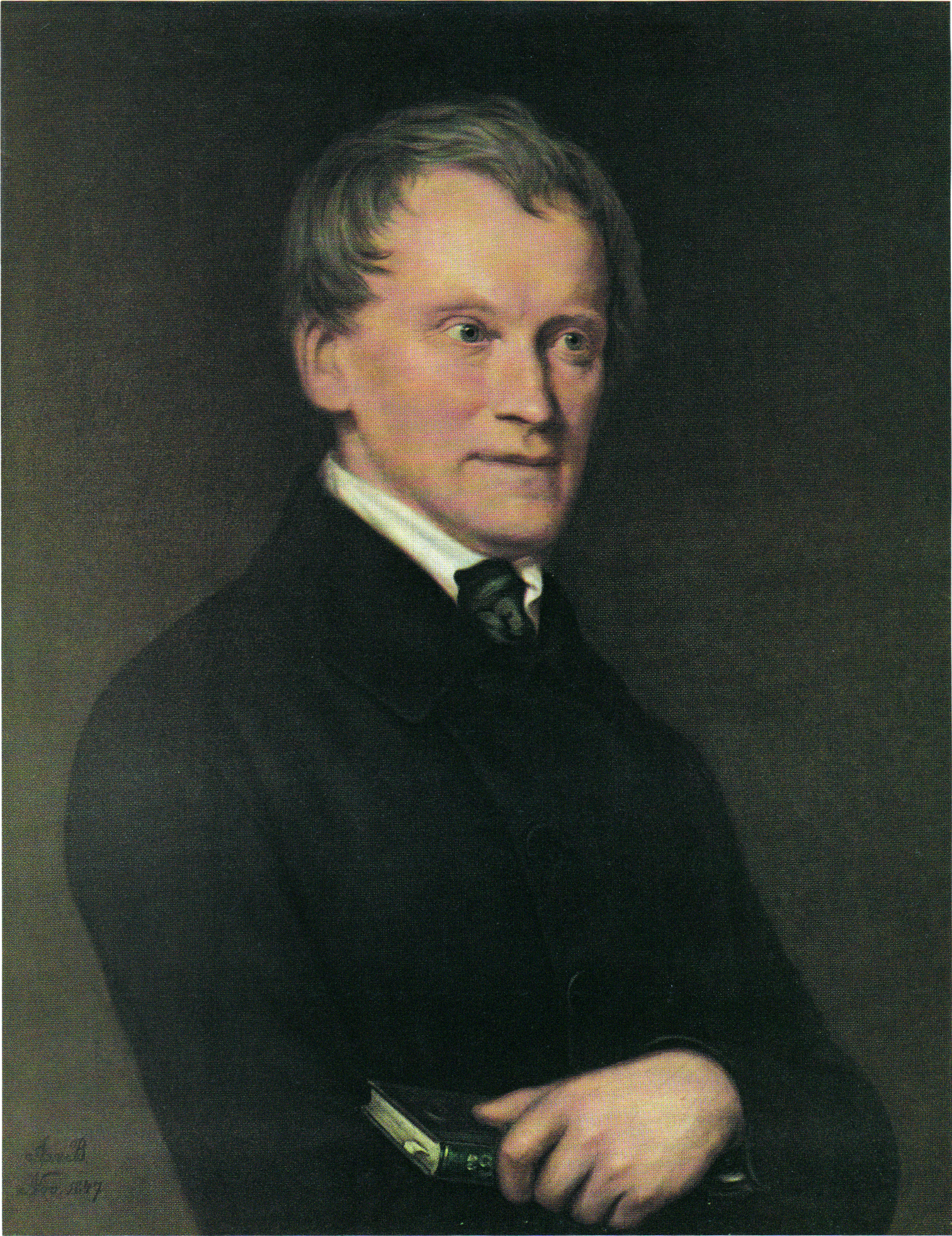
Johann Friedrich Böhmer

Johann Friedrich Böhmer (Frankfurt am Main, 22 April 1795 – 22 October 1863) was a German historian, diplomatic and librarian. He is best known for his Regesta, an annotated collection of charters and imperial documents of medieval Germany.

== Biography ==
Böhmer was born in Frankfurt as the son of the Palatine official Karl Ludwig Böhmer. Educated at the universities of Heidelberg and Göttingen, he showed an interest in art and visited Italy; but returning to Frankfurt he turned his attention to the study of history, and became secretary of the Gesellschaft für ältere deutsche Geschichtskunde. He was also archivist and then librarian of the city of Frankfurt.

Böhmer had a great dislike of Prussia and the Protestant faith, and a corresponding affection for Austria and the Roman Catholic Church, to which, however, he did not belong. His researches are of great value to students. He died unmarried.

Johannes Janssen wrote a biography in three volumes in 1868 of Böhmer, a man whom he considered as his teacher and guide.

== Historical work ==
Böhmer's historical work was chiefly concerned with collecting and tabulating charters and other imperial documents of the Middle Ages. First, an abstract appeared: the Regesta chronologico-diplomatica regum atque imperatorum Romanorum 911-1313 (Frankfurt, 1831), which was followed by the Regesta chronologico-diplomatica Karolorum. Die Urkunden sämtlicher Karolinger in kurzen Auszügen (Frankfurt, 1833), and a series of Regesta imperii. For the period 1314-1347 (Frankfurt, 1839), the Regesta was followed by three volumes, and for the period 1246-1313 (Frankfurt, 1844) by two supplementary volumes. The remaining period of the Regesta, as edited by Böhmer, covers 1198-1254 (Stuttgart, 1849). These collections contain introductions and explanatory passages by the author.

Equally valuable is the Fontes rerum Germanicarum (Stuttgart, 1843–1868), a collection of original sources for German history during the 13th and 14th centuries. The fourth and last volume of this work was edited by A. Huber after the author's death. Other collections edited by Böhmer are: Die Reichsgesetze 900-1400 (Frankfurt, 1832); Wittelsbachische Regesten von der Erwerbung des Herzogtums Bayern 1180 bis zu dessen erster Wiedervereinigung 1340 (Stuttgart, 1854); and Codex diplomaticus Moeno-Francofurtanus. Urkundenbuch der Reichsstadt Frankfurt (Frankfurt, 1836; new edition by F Law, 1901).

Other volumes and editions of the Regesta imperii, edited by Julius von Ficker, Engelbert Mühlbacher, Eduard Winkelmann and others, are largely based on Böhmer's work. Böhmer left a great amount of unpublished material, and after his death two other works were published from his papers: Acta imperii selecta, edited by J. Ficker (Innsbruck, 1870); and Regesta archiepiscoporum Maguntinensium, edited by C Will (Innsbruck, 1877–1886).
