= Theodor von Sickel =

German-Austrian historian (1826–1908)

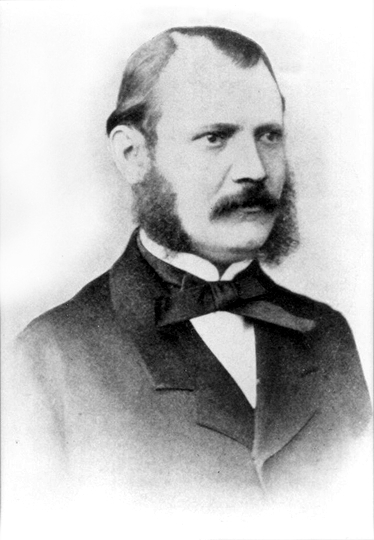
Theodor von Sickel (1826–1908)

Theodor von Sickel (18 December 1826 – 21 April 1908) was a German-Austrian historian born in Aken, Province of Saxony, Kingdom of Prussia. He specialized in early European medieval history, and is considered to be the founder of modern diplomatics (critical document research).

In 1850 he obtained his doctorate from the University of Halle, then furthered his studies at the École Nationale des Chartes in Paris. In 1857 he was appointed professor at the University of Vienna, and from 1869 to 1891, he was director of the Institut für Österreichische Geschichtsforschung (Institute of Austrian Historical Research), specializing in ancillary branches of historical study, that included paleography, chronology and diplomatics.

From 1875 he was a member of the Monumenta Germaniae Historica, of which, he subsequently became head of its diplomata section. In this capacity, he performed meticulous and expert edition of medieval documents, including over 1300 royal documents of the 10th century (Diplomata regum et imperatorum Germaniae).

In 1881 he established the Österreichisches Historisches Institut (Austrian Historical Institute) in Rome, serving as its director until 1901. From 1897 to 1908, he was president of the Bavarian Academy of Sciences.

== Selected works ==
- Beiträge zur Diplomatik (8 volumes, 1861–1882).
- Acta regum et imperatorum Karolinorum digesta et ennarata. Volume 1: Urkundenlehre (1867), Volume 2: Urkundenregesten.
- Monumenta Germaniae Historica. Diplomata regum et imperatorum Germaniae 1 (Conradi I., Heinrici I. et Ottonis I. Diplomata), Hannover 1879-1884 – Conrad I, Henry I, Otto I.
- Monumenta Germaniae Historica, Diplomata regum et imperatorum Germaniae 2,1 (Ottonis II. Diplomata), Hannover 1888 – Otto II.
- Monumenta Germaniae Historica, Diplomata regum et imperatorum Germaniae 2,2 (Ottonis III. Diplomata), Hannover 1893 – Otto III.
- Kaiserurkunden in Abbildungen, 11 parts 1890/91 (with Heinrich von Sybel, 1817-1895)
- Römische Berichte (5 volumes, 1895–1901).
