= Hagen Keller =

German Medieval historian

Ruedi Hagen Keller (born 2 May 1937, in Freiburg im Breisgau, Germany) is a German historian specializing in the history of the early and high Middle Ages. He works mainly on the Ottonian period, the Italian communes, and the culture of writing in the Middle Ages. Keller taught as Professor of Medieval History at the University of Münster from 1982 until his retirement in 2002. His collaboration with his colleague Gerd Althoff was particularly fruitful. With their work, Keller and Althoff made a decisive contribution to Münster's reputation in international medieval studies. Keller's research has had a considerable influence on German and international medieval studies since the 1980s and has led to a reassessment of early and high medieval kingship.

== Life ==
=== Origin and early years ===
Hagen Keller was born in Freiburg im Breisgau, Germany, in May 1937, the son of Rudolf Keller, an independent businessman, and his wife Ruth, who was born in Frankenbach. He has four siblings, including volcanologist Jörg Keller. Italy held a special attraction for the whole family. The family first travelled to Italy in 1952 to Lake Maggiore. Starting in the 1950s, the father established business relations with Italy. He imported Italian woodworking machinery. Keller's younger brothers continued the business. Keller's younger sister worked as an au pair, teaching German to the children of an Italian family. Jörg Keller studied for a time in Catania and later worked as a volcanologist in Italy.

After the bombing of Freiburg in 1944, the family lived in Pfullendorf, north of Lake Constance. They returned to Freiburg in 1950. During his school years, Hagen Keller was intensely interested in astronomy. From childhood on, he was less interested in historical novels or biographies; his historical curiosity was stimulated more by monuments and concrete objects. The starting point for his historical awareness was the direct experience of his childhood, the Second World War and National Socialism.

Keller graduated from the Kepler Gymnasium in Freiburg in 1956. Inspired by his high school math and physics classes, he initially planned to study those subjects. However, he abandoned this plan shortly before the semester began. Keller decided to become a teacher. From the summer semester of 1956 to the summer semester of 1962, he studied history, Latin philology, science policy, German studies, philosophy, and physical education at the universities of Freiburg and Kiel. In his first semester, he completed the Medieval Proseminar with Manfred Hellmann. His interest in the Middle Ages was awakened during his third semester in the summer of 1957 by Hans Blumenberg's Kiel lecture on the philosophy of the 14th and 15th centuries. After his return to Freiburg, Keller concentrated on this period with Gerd Tellenbach.

=== Academic career ===
From the beginning of 1959, Keller belonged to the "Freiburg working group" for medieval personal research, a group of young researchers led by Gerd Tellenbach. There he met Karl Schmid, Joachim Wollasch, Eduard Hlawitschka, Hansmartin Schwarzmaier and Wilhelm Kurze. The professional exchange with Karl Schmid had a particularly lasting influence on him. As a student of Tellenbach, Keller initially dealt with basic questions of the Alemannic-Franconian history of the early Middle Ages. In 1962, he completed his doctorate under Tellenbach on the subject of Einsiedeln Monastery in Ottonian Swabia.

In 1962/63, Keller was a research assistant to Tellenbach at the Institute for Historical Regional Studies at the University of Freiburg, and from 1963 to 1969 he was a research assistant at the German Historical Institute in Rome. It was during his stay in Rome that Keller determined that the social structure of medieval Italy would be one of the focal points of his future work. Keller also spent the first years of his marriage to Hanni Kahlert, whom he married in 1964, in Italy.

From 1969 to 1972, Keller again worked as a research assistant at the History Department of the University of Freiburg. There, in 1972, he earned his habilitation with a dissertation entitled Seniors and Vassals, Capitans and Valvassors. Studies on the ruling class in the Lombard cities of the 9th-12th centuries with special reference to Milan, the teaching qualification for Medieval and Modern History. The habilitation thesis was substantially revised and expanded for printing. In July 1972 he gave his inaugural lecture in Freiburg on Late Antiquity and the Early Middle Ages in the area between Lake Geneva and the High Rhine.

After another stay at the German Historical Institute in Rome from 1972 to 1973, Keller worked as a university lecturer in Freiburg. In 1976 he was appointed associate professor. In 1978 he received a C3 professorship for Medieval History at the University of Freiburg. In 1979/80 he was Dean of the Philosophical Faculty IV and spokesman of the Joint Committee of the Philosophical Faculties of the University of Freiburg. From 1980 to 1982, Keller was head of the Department of Regional History in the Department of History.

In 1982 he succeeded Karl Hauck at the University of Münster, where he was full professor of medieval history and co-director of the Institute for Early Medieval Studies until his retirement in 2002. He gave his inaugural lecture in June 1983 on population growth and social organization in the European High Middle Ages using the example of Upper Italian agrarian society in the 12th and 13th centuries. In Münster, Keller was one of the founders and for many years the spokesman of the special research area "Carriers, Fields, Forms of Pragmatic Writing" and of the graduate program "Written Culture and Society in the Middle Ages. Keller was instrumental in making Münster a centre of international medieval studies.

As an academic teacher, he supervised 25 dissertations and five habilitations. His academic students include Franz-Josef Arlinghaus, Marita Blattmann, Christoph Dartmann, Jenny Rahel Oesterle, Hedwig Röckelein, Thomas Scharff, and Petra Schulte. He was succeeded in Münster by Martin Kintzinger. Keller gave his farewell lecture in Münster in July 2002 on the overcoming and presence of the "Middle Ages" in European modernity. In it, he tried to define the current position of the Middle Ages. Since the 15th century, there has been a widespread social desire to distance oneself from the Middle Ages. Reform, revolution, rationality, and technical inventions, including their economic and military uses, had formed the guiding principles and the framework of life with which people wanted to distinguish themselves from the Middle Ages. In the last three decades, however, historians have increasingly relativized the epochal boundary around 1500. The scholarly discussion of epochal boundaries and epochal designations illustrates a new way of thinking about the relationship between the present and our long past. In the face of an increasingly unclear awareness of the epoch, Keller locates the task and topicality of medieval studies in the self-assurance of man, for which knowledge of the past is necessary.

Keller was co-editor of Propylaea History of Germany from 1982 to 1995 and co-editor of the series Münster Historical Research since 1991. From 1988 to 2011 he was editor of Early Medieval Studies. He has been a member of the Commission for Historical Regional Studies in Baden-Württemberg since 1980, of the Konstanz Working Group for Medieval History since 1989, and of the Historical Commission for Westphalia since 1990. Keller has been a visiting professor at the Istituto Italiano per gli Studi Storici in Naples (1979), at the University of Florence (1997), and at the École des Hautes Études en Sciences Sociales in Paris (2001). In 2002 he was elected to the British Academy and in the same year he became a member of the Royal Historical Society in London.

The 36th volume of Early Medieval Studies was dedicated to him. On the occasion of his 70th birthday in 2007, a conference was held in his honour in Münster, the results of which were published in 2011 in the anthology Between Pragmatics and Performance. Dimensions of Medieval Written Culture. In May 2017, on the occasion of his 80th birthday, a colloquium was held at the Department of History of the University of Münster. The focus was on current perspectives on the history of politics in the Middle Ages.

== Work ==
Keller produced more than 150 publications. His works on the foundations and manifestations of Ottonian kingship, on the nobility and urban society in Italy, on the upheavals of the Salian and Staufer periods, and the early period of the Duchy of Swabia are important. From 1975 he worked closely with Gerd Althoff, a student of Keller's mentor Karl Schmid. Their exchange was particularly fruitful for the study of Ottonian historiography and the complex problems of group behaviour and statehood.

=== The foundations of Ottonian kingship ===
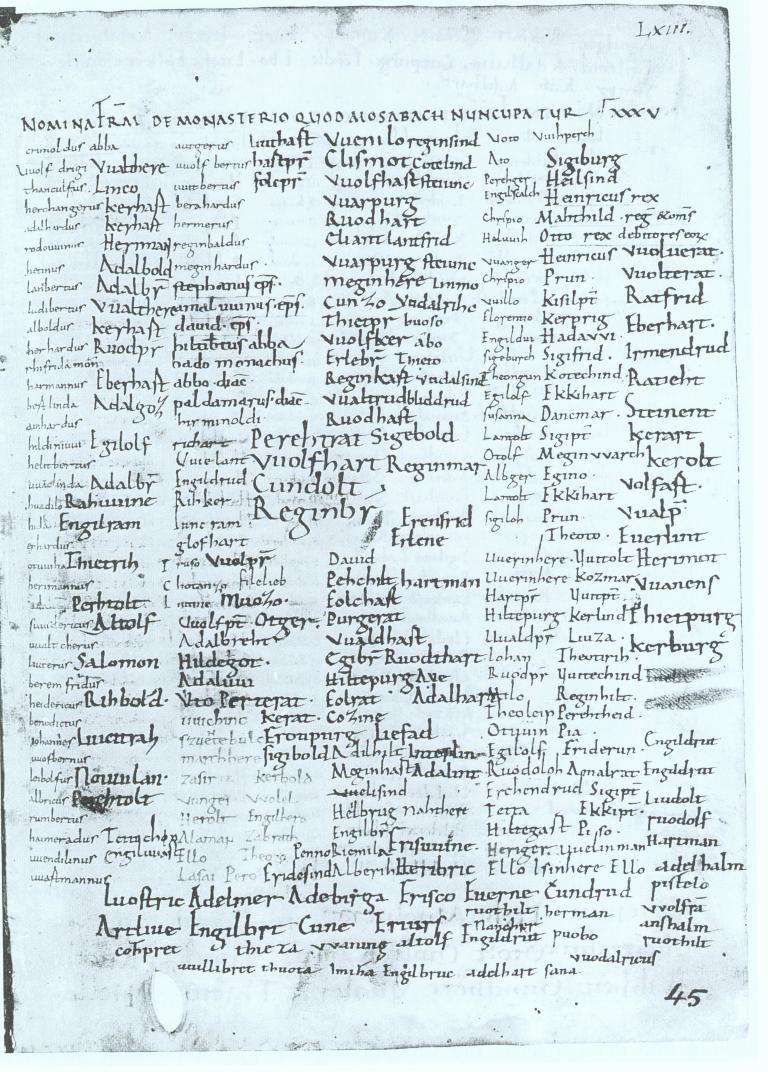
The Reichenau Fraternity Book records the names of the Ottonian royal family and their most important helpers from 929.

The starting point for Keller's work on the functioning of Ottonian kingship was the research of his teacher Gerd Tellenbach. In the 1950s, the "Freiburg Working Group" recognized that entries in the fraternity and commemorative books of the early Middle Ages were made in groups. In times of crisis, members of the ruling classes increasingly had the names of their relatives and friends entered into the monastery registers. This had remained hidden from earlier research, which had focused on constitutional history. The analysis of the commemorative tradition brought a completely new understanding of the ties and contacts that the nobility, the church, and the kings maintained with each other. It also made the accounts in Ottonian historiography easier to understand. The "Freiburg Working Group" produced numerous prosopographic, aristocratic, and social-historical works, especially in the 10th century. According to Gerd Althoff, the scholarly discussion on the "emergence" of the "German" empire was also important for Keller's research. As a result, Keller formulated his new view of the "foundations of Ottonian kingship" on the occasion of Gerd Tellenbach's 80th birthday in 1983. His remarks showed that he viewed this kingship differently from his teacher Tellenbach and some of Tellenbach's older students, such as Josef Fleckenstein. According to Fleckenstein, all the king's activities were aimed at strengthening his power over the nobility and the church in the long run. Keller, on the other hand, based his analysis of the political order of the Ottonian Empire on a polycentric system of rule. In his view, a count of royal courts, royal estates, taxes, customs duties, and other revenues did not adequately describe the state order and the possibilities of political organization in the 10th and 11th centuries. For Keller, it was no longer the acquisition and expansion of power that was the yardstick for measuring the achievements of Ottonian rulers, but rather their integrative function. The kingship had the task of integrating the individual aristocratic dominions "by shaping personal relationships and thus giving them the quality of a ruling and legal order. In light of these findings, the image of a personal associational state based on loyalty and allegiance to a leader, as portrayed by Otto Brunner and Theodor Mayer under the influence of National Socialism, was considered outdated. As a result, Gerd Althoff examined the personal networks of relationships that kings and magnates established, maintained, and, when necessary, were able to change.

Keller's 1982 essay Imperial Structure and Concept of Rule in the Ottonian-Early Salian Period, which Gerd Althoff described as the "initial spark" for further research into the foundations of Ottonian kingship, is considered a methodologically important study for understanding Ottonian kingship. In this work, Keller examined the relationship between the Ottonian-Salian rulers and the southern German dukes in Bavaria and Swabia on the basis of the places where the documents of Otto I, Henry II, and Henry III were issued. This is the first time that the importance of Swabia in the Ottonian and early Salian itinerary has been examined. Keller observed a profound change in Ottonian kingship. Until the time of Otto III, Swabia had been used only as a transit country to Italy; royal stays were kept as short as possible. From the year 1000, however, royal rule was publicly demonstrated by the "periodic presence of the court in all parts of the empire. This essay paved the way for a new understanding of the expansion of Ottonian kingship in the Empire.

In their double biography of the first two Ottonians, Henry I, and Otto I, published in 1985, Hagen Keller and Gerd Althoff made intensive use of the findings on medieval prayer commemoration. In particular, the commemoration of prayers in the Ottonian house monasteries of Lüneburg and Merseburg gave an impression of the kinship and alliance relationships of the noble owners. Amicitiae (alliances of friendship) became the central instrument of Henry I rule in his dealings with the magnate, while convivia (communal ritual feasts) was the starting point for political alliances and conspiracies. For Althoff and Keller, the first two Ottonian rulers were no longer symbols of Germany's early power and greatness, but rather representatives of an archaic society far removed from modern thinking. Keller and Althoff identified a structural change in the reigns of Henry I and Otto I. As king, Henry had achieved a balance with numerous rulers through formal alliances of friendship. For Keller and Althoff, the arrangement with the dukes based on these friendship treaties was one of the "foundations for the rapid success in stabilizing royal rule. Henry's son Otto I, on the other hand, had not continued these mutually binding alliances (pacta mutua) with the magnate of his realm, thereby provoking conflict. Otto had shown no consideration for the claims of his kinsmen and nobility; rather, he was concerned with asserting his royal authority. By adopting Carolingian traditions, Otto emphasized the distance between the king and the nobility. Given Henry's friendly alliances with the southern German dukes, Althoff and Keller argue that, according to the understanding of the time, "the dukes' claims were hardly less well-founded or justified than his claim to kingship. Accordingly, it was only logical that Henry renounced an additional legitimation of his kingship by renouncing the anointing when he became king. The realization of the meaning and significance of the amicitia alliances also relativized the image of an anticlerical king painted by older scholars. Henry entered into prayer alliances with both ecclesiastical and secular magnates. According to Althoff and Keller, the friendship pacts with the dukes also created a new scope for the king. The magnates themselves had ties and obligations that extended beyond the borders of the realm. The arrangement with the dukes and the resulting increase in power and prestige gave the king new opportunities to work to his advantage in neighbouring areas of the empire.

At the 1988 German Historians Conference in Bamberg, Keller chaired the section on "Group ties, organization of rule, and written culture under the Ottonians. There he addressed the fundamental problem of "statehood" in the early Middle Ages, presenting a paper entitled "On the character of 'statehood' between Carolingian imperial reform and the expansion of rule in the High Middle Ages". According to Keller, the political culture of the Ottonians in the 10th century cannot be captured by the categories of modern statehood. Ottonian rule was largely without written form, without institutions, without regulated responsibilities and lines of authority, and above all without a monopoly on the use of force. The political order of the Ottonian period was characterized by orality, rituals, and personal ties, whereas the Carolingian empire was characterized by writing, institutions, a highly centralized form of rule, and the royal distribution of offices. The possibilities and limits of royal rule in the tenth century under these conditions were examined in Bamberg by Gerd Althoff about the institutional mechanisms of conflict resolution between king and magnate, and by Rudolf Schieffer about the relationship between the episcopate and the king. The Bamberg lectures were published in Early Medieval Studies in 1989 and are considered an important starting point for a reassessment of Ottonian kingship.

The knowledge of the commemorative tradition also created new conditions for reading the works of Ottonian historiography. In the course of cataloguing the monastic commemorative books of the Carolingian and Ottonian periods, Karl Schmid came across an entry in the Reichenau commemorative book that referred to Otto as rex as early as 929. His research in 1960 and 1964 on the succession to the throne of Otto I brought new facts into the scholarly discussion. Until then, research had been based solely on the information provided by Widukind of Corvey, whose Saxon History seemed to indicate that King Henry I had appointed his eldest son Otto as his successor in 936, shortly before his death. In an essay on Widukind's account of Otto the Great's accession to the throne in Aachen, written in 1995 in the context of the discussion on the critique of memory and tradition, Keller emphasized the importance of the results that Karl Schmid had obtained based on the memory tradition: they "enable and force a different kind of access: namely, to examine the intention of representation and its 'deforming' effect on the 'report' at a central point by confronting it with deviating information. At the same time, Johannes Fried pointed out that historical events are subject to a powerful process of deformation. Historical memory "changes incessantly and imperceptibly, even during the lifetimes of those involved. According to Fried, the resulting view of the past was "never identical with actual history. For Fried, the Widukind of Corvey History of the Saxons, the main source for the early Othonian kingship, is "a construct saturated with errors. Based on Schmid's work on a possible succession to Henry I as early as 928/29, Keller again turned to Widukind's criticism. In contrast to the approach to the unreliability of Ottonian historiography developed by the historians Fedor Schneider, Martin Lintzel, and Carlrichard Brühl and continued by Johannes Fried, Keller concentrated on the effects of a deliberately shaped and deformed representation that aims to show something specific about events. Keller fundamentally doubted whether it was legitimate to apply ethnological methods to a literate medieval historian like Widukind to study completely unwritten cultures. Rather, Widukind's point of view was "based on the entire arsenal of literary design possibilities of a writing culture rich in tradition. Against Fried's criticism of tradition, Keller argued that in 967/68 there were still contemporary witnesses who had directly experienced the events of the royal revolts and successions of 919, 929/30, and 936. Their memories could not be ignored. It is known from Italian interrogations of witnesses in the 12th and 13th centuries that the memories of the oldest witnesses went back up to 70 years, according to their own statements. According to Keller, a royal elevation with simultaneous anointing took place for the first time in the Ottonian period in 961, not in 936. Keller understood Widukind's account of the election and coronation of Otto I in Aachen in 936 as a backward projection by the historian based on the model of the coronation and anointing of Otto II in Aachen in 961, at which he was present as a witness. Keller had already put forward this thesis in lectures in 1969 and 1972. Otto's spiritual consecration had already taken place in Mainz in 930. Keller refers to a note in the 13th-century Lausanne Annals, which is given new significance by Schmid's work on Henry's succession to the throne. The Aachen Act of 936 thus only appears to be a demonstration of power. According to Keller, this reconstruction also clarifies the previously "rather confusing history of coronation law and the coronation site in the Roman-German Empire". However, it does not expose Widukind as a fabulist. Rather, Keller evaluates Widukind's depiction of "self-experienced" history as a statement on current issues. Widukind's description of the coronation should be understood as a critique of the growing influence of the church on the legitimation of rule and the increasing sacralization of kingship. The historian contrasts this development with the "divine plan of salvation," i.e., the rise of the Saxons to kingship as an expression of divine activity and warrior kingship. Keller comes to completely different conclusions than Hartmut Hoffmann, who rejects Schmid's thesis of a decision on the succession in 929/30 and an early anointing of Otto.

In another study, Keller attempts to show that Widukind's historical view of the Ottonian kingship was shaped by biblical ideas. The exhortations that Judas Maccabeus or his brothers are said to have given to their troops before the start of a battle are comparable to the speeches of the Saxon kings Heinrich and Otto before the Hungarian battles of 933 and 955. The Maccabean leaders would have exhorted their followers to put all their trust in God and the victories God had granted their forefathers, and to stand with their lives for the validity of the divine law. The enemies, on the other hand, could only trust in their superior strength and their weapons. Widukind was convinced that the military successes of King Henry and his son Otto repeated the victories God had granted the Maccabees against the superiority of their godless enemies.

In examining the portrayal of rulers in Ottonian historiography of the 960s (Widukind, Liudprand of Cremona, and Hrotsvit), Keller rejects "interpreting the authors' statements simply as testimony to a free-floating history of ideas about kingship. Rather, Keller argues, the statements of Ottonian historiography are "directly related to life" and their formulations are to be understood as "statements on questions that moved the innermost circle of the court, the rulers of the time.

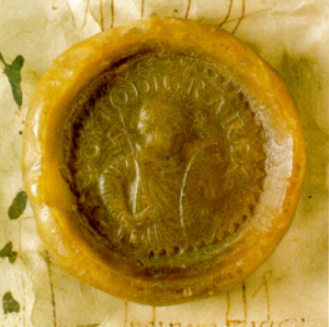
The royal seal of Otto I shows the king with lance and shield. It was in use from 936 to 961.

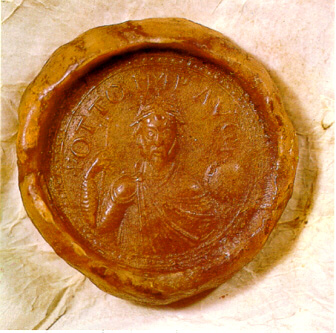
The so-called Third Imperial Seal (c. 965) of Otto I shows the imperial insignia (crown, sceptre and Globus cruciger) and no longer depicts the ruler with lance and shield. The previous profile or side view of the seal is replaced by a frontal view.

By examining various source genres (historiography, symbols of rule, images of rulers), Keller was able to identify a fundamental link between Ottonian kingship and the Christian ethics of rulers. In his studies of the change in the image of the ruler on Carolingian and Ottonian royal and imperial seals, he no longer understood them as mere propaganda of power but took greater account of the liturgical context of the tradition. He observed a fundamental change in the representation of power under Otto the Great. After the imperial coronation in 962, the depiction of the ruler on the seals changed from Frankish-Carolingian models to a Byzantine model: the half-figure of the king in side view became the emperor in frontal view. Keller studied the portrait of the sovereign in the codex Ottobonianus latinus 74 of the Vatican Library, which is kept in Montecassino. He dates the manuscript to the time of Henry III ("around 1045/47"). The image of the sovereign on folio 193v is not Henry II, but Henry III. He bases his thesis on Wipo's Tetralogus and points to similarities in the understanding of rulership between the miniature and the literary work. Until Keller's interpretation, the portrait had always referred to Henry II.

Symbolic communication also became important for a reassessment of early and high medieval kingship. Hagen Keller, in close collaboration with Gerd Althoff, has thought about demonstrative-ritual and symbolic behaviour in the Ottonian period. The study of rituals and forms of symbolic communication led to the realization that Ottonian historians' representational intentions were primarily focused on the ruler's ties and obligations to God and his loyal followers. Given the importance of personal ties and symbolic forms of communication, Gerd Althoff developed the trenchant thesis of the Ottonian "kingship without state.

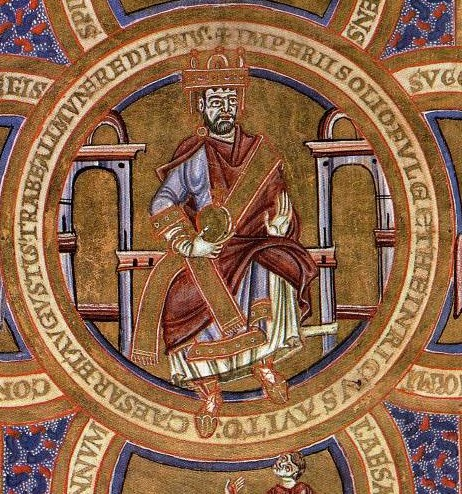
Detail with the enthroned Emperor Henry II (or Henry III?) in the Gospels of Montecassino (Rome, Biblioteca Apostolica Vaticana, Codex Ottob. lat. 74, fol. 193v)

In addition to the lack of institutional penetration of the Ottonian kingdom, the exercise of consensual rule is a central criterion in Keller's analysis of the foundations of Ottonian kingship. According to Keller, the king derived his dignity and authority from the consensus of his loyal followers and from the divinely legitimized order of which he was the administrator. In a study of the king's role in the appointment of bishops in the Ottonian and Salian kingdoms, Keller showed that promotions were usually the consensual result of negotiations between the ruler and the cathedral chapter.

In 2001, Keller published a concise presentation of Ottonian history for a wider audience. This overview appeared in its fourth edition in 2008 and was translated into Czech in 2004 and into Italian in 2012. In 2002, on the occasion of Keller's 65th birthday, seven essays written between 1982 and 1997 were published in the anthology Ottonian Kingship. Organization and Legitimation of Royal Power. Together with Gerd Althoff, Keller wrote volume 3 of the new "Gebhardt" (Handbook of German History) on the late Carolingian and Ottonian period, which was published in 2008. Keller wrote the section on the period from the end of the Carolingian Empire to the end of the reign of Otto II. The chapter on "Lebensordnungen und Lebensformen" was written jointly by the two authors. Their declared aim was a "fundamental revision of the traditional view of history", i.e. the "denationalization of the image of the Ottonian Empire".

=== Italian urban communities and written culture in the Middle Ages ===
Since about 1965, the relationships between individuals and families in the Middle Ages have been studied with the help of private documents. This new approach was implemented by Gerd Tellenbach and his students using examples from Tuscany and Lombardy. Of particular importance for the history of the city was the in-depth study of the ruling structures based on private documents. In 1969, Keller published his first study on Italy. In it, he examined the place of jurisdiction within the larger cities of Tuscany and northern Italy from the 9th to the 11th centuries and concluded the balance of power between king, bishop, count, and urban patrician. The study shows how the rising powers in the cities, the capitani (high nobility) and the vavasour, slipped away from the influence of the sovereign. Keller also notes the collapse of the material foundations of Lombard Italian kingship: imperial property and imperial rights were lost to the feudal nobility. In his habilitation thesis published in 1979, Aristocratic Rule and Urban Society in Northern Italy, he no longer focuses solely on the high aristocracy of counts and margraves, but also on the middle nobility, the capitani and valvassors known as episcopal (sub-)vassals. Keller first analyzes the development of the terms plebs, populus, civis, capitaneus, and vavasour in the 11th and 12th centuries. He then examines the wealth situation of capitani, peasants, and vavasour. He sees the cause of the Upper Italian vassal uprisings at the end of the 10th and beginning of the 11th century in the "revindication of church property and imperial rights that had been left to the churches". It was therefore a matter of resisting measures that threatened the position of the nobility. In terms of social development, Keller notes "a constancy of the aristocratic upper class from the late 9th to the 12th century and a social dynamic below this aristocratic leadership group that was shaped by changes in ruling structures and reinforced by economic development. Because the study analyzed mainly Milanese sources, it was perceived in Italy primarily as a study of Milan and its sphere of influence. Keller, however, wanted to use a regional example to show "how far and in what ways the social history of northern Italy was involved in the general developments of the société féodale during the 10th-12th centuries". Keller's work, which was translated into Italian in 1995, is considered one of the most important case studies of Italian communes.

In 1986, the new medieval special research field 231 was established at the University of Münster on the subject of "Carriers, Fields and Forms of Pragmatic Writing in the Middle Ages". The international debate on the conditions of communication in oral societies in the 1960s and 1970s provided the impetus for an interdisciplinary research project on the development of European written culture in the Middle Ages. The work of the Collaborative Research Center built on this research situation. Numerous studies on the pragmatics of writing itself or on the function of administrative writing in northern Italian communities were initiated and directed by Keller. The Collaborative Research Center dealt with the development of writing in Europe from the 11th to the early 16th century. According to the initial 1985 proposal, this was the period in which writing "assumed a life-giving function for society and the individual. The 11th and 12th centuries are considered a crucial transitional period for northern Italy. During this period, writing spread to all areas of human interaction. The research program of the Collaborative Research Center was carried out in seven subprojects starting in 1986. The results, presented and discussed at four international colloquia, have been published in four comprehensive volumes. Pragmatic writing is understood as action-oriented writing. In the sense of the research program, "pragmatic" means all "forms of writing that directly serve purposeful action or that aim to guide human action and behavior by imparting knowledge," i.e., "written material for whose creation and use the requirements of life practice were constitutive. Keller studied pragmatic writing primarily about Italian urban communities and the communal societies of the High Middle Ages.

From 1986 to 1999, Keller directed subproject A, "The Writing Process and its Carriers in Upper Italy," as part of the Collaborative Research Center 231. From the 12th century onwards, the source base in communal Italy expanded. Written documentation for government and administration increased to an extent that has no parallel in Europe, despite the general increase in writing. According to Keller, three factors favored the process of writing in the administration of Italian communes. The first was the temporal limitation of the exercise of municipal authority; this required the written record of administrative actions and procedural steps in the administration of justice to ensure continuity. Second, the fear of abuse of office led to a detailed definition of official powers and rules of conduct for officials to control the correctness of official conduct and administrative actions. Sanctions had to be established for violations of the rules. The third factor was the increasing measures taken by the municipality to provide for the livelihood, security, and prosperity of the community. The expansion of the use of writing in communal Italy gave rise to a new source genre in the form of statute codices, the comprehensive collections of applicable statute law whose origins, early history, structure, and social significance Keller explored in his research project. The establishment of norms through statutes is seen as an expression of a profound cultural change in Italian municipalities. The sharp increase in the use of written law was therefore accompanied by a large number of new legal provisions, a systematic organization of the statute books and periodic revisions. Within a few decades, the forms of legal protection and legal procedure were fundamentally changed.

The research project on the pragmatic use of writing in communal Italy initially focused on the modernization of government and administration. However, further research also revealed the disadvantages of the use of writing. Writing had brought with it an increased regimentation of rural economic management and village life. For example, rural communities were told how much grain they had to deliver to the city, broken down by variety. In the increasing number of leases, the duties of each crop were specified in detail. The peasants' livestock was reduced. The town councils forbade the mountain population to keep pack animals. Only millers and carters were allowed to keep a certain number of these animals, and they had to carry registration papers for police control.

Keller and his research group in Münster were able to show numerous examples of how administrative and governmental actions in Italian municipalities were continuously and completely written down. This was accompanied by a new way of dealing with records. Thanks to systematic archiving, files could be found and used again generations later. Written documentation helped, for example, to ensure that the local population was provided for in times of need, and it also made it easier to track down heretics. According to Thomas Scharff, a colleague of Keller's, the medieval inquisition was "inconceivable without the growth of pragmatic writing.

On the basis of his research on the administrative records of the Italian communes, which grew enormously from the end of the 12th century, Keller examined the social side effects and anthropological consequences of this process of writing. He asked about the significance of writing for people's worldviews and strategies of action. His thesis is "that the forms of cognitive orientation associated with writing are of direct importance for the process of individualization that can be traced in European society since the High Middle Ages". These considerations are related to the general discussion of the emergence of individuality from the 12th century onwards. Keller used tax collection and grain and supply policies to show that the living conditions of each individual citizen in the community were integrated into controllable procedures through administrative writing. The process of writing around 1200 also led to a profound change in the legal life of Italian cities. Writing down the law meant that individuals could free themselves from group ties and locate themselves in the political and social order.

=== Symbolic communication ===
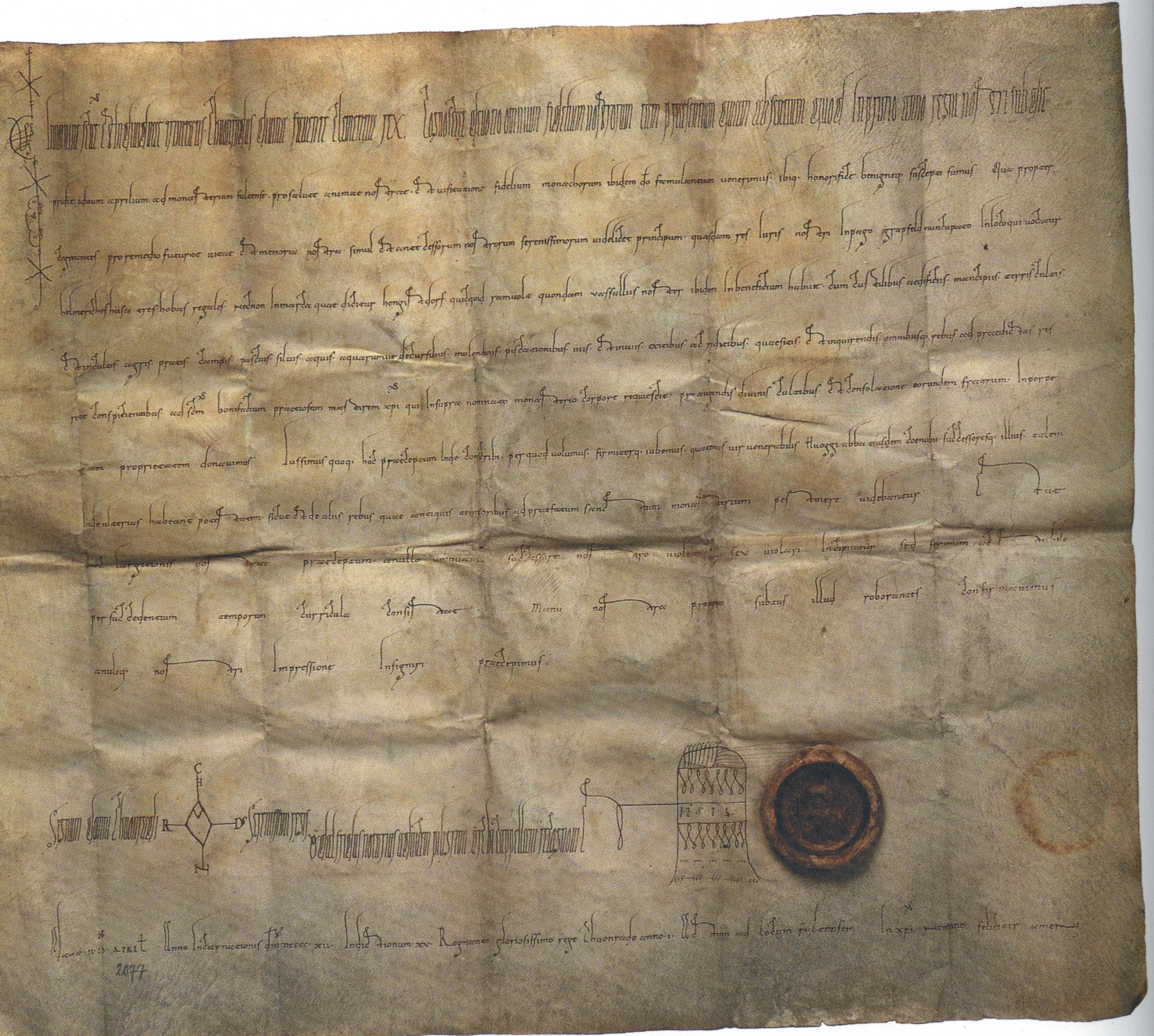
Royal charter of Conrad I. Donation to the Fulda monastery on 12 April 912.

The subproject directed by Keller, Document and Book in the Symbolic Communication of Medieval Legal Communities and Ruling Associations (2000–2008), was part of the Collaborative Research Center 496: Symbolic Communication and Social Value Systems from the Middle Ages to the French Revolution. One of the key questions of the Collaborative Research Center was: "When and why did people change acts of symbolic communication, introduce new ones, or abandon old ones?" This subproject also focused on communal Italy. The project dealt with the possible interpretations of the use of writing in its communicative context. The aim was to gain new insights into the creation and use of sovereign documents in the early and high Middle Ages.

The inclusion of symbolic communication contributed to a reevaluation of written form. According to Keller, deeds were "the most important and at the same time the most solemn medium of written communication" in early medieval governing and legal communities. In the case of rulers' charters, Keller argued that more attention should be paid to the hitherto under-studied act of privilege and the circumstances that led to the creation of the charters. A comprehensive and adequate assessment of the historical significance of a document is only possible by taking symbolic communication into account. Keller argues that the text of a document and its symbolic public interaction are inextricably intertwined. Only when the overall structure and message of a charter and its historical situation are taken into account are the prerequisites for a better understanding of privilege and the act of privileging given. Keller thus sees charters not only as textual or legal documents but also as a means of representation and self-representation of the ruler and as a "sign of sovereignty" in the king's communication with his followers. According to Keller, the act of granting the charter was less an expression of the ruler's free will than the result of a process of communication and consensus-building between the ruler and various interest groups. Privileging should be understood as a ritualized communication process that went far beyond the mere act of issuing the charter. The immediate context of the creation and use of a deed can be better understood by classifying it as a ceremonial act. Parts of the charter should be interpreted as deliberate communicative signals. In this way, a charter, which puts a legal fact into writing, becomes a source for a specific situation in the medieval ruling community. According to Keller's research, the "written cultural elements of authenticity assurance" in early and high Carolingian charters were replaced around 860 by greater publicity and representativeness in the act of authentication. The king's monogram and seal were enlarged and clearly separated from the text. The "visual presentation of the document" seems to be "embedded in a change in the ruler's public communication with his followers. This type of sealing took into account the poor literacy of the secular officials. The document thus became a medium of symbolic communication in the 10th century. According to Keller, the meaning of the deed and the document changed during the 11th and 12th centuries as perceptions of the social foundations of law and the guarantee of law by rule and community changed. From the middle of the 12th century, the use of writing and the differentiation of business documents in the socio-cultural context can be observed.

=== Upheavals in the Salian and Staufer periods ===
In an essay published in 1983 on the behaviour of the Swabian dukes of the 11th and 12th centuries as pretenders to the throne, Keller initiated a paradigm shift in German-language medieval studies with the idea of "princely responsibility for the empire". His new research approach was based on the motives of the magnates and the fundamental relationship between king, princes, and empire as a whole. Keller identified a change in the understanding of elections in the 11th and 12th centuries and was able to show that the behaviour of the Swabian dukes had motives other than the previously assumed motive of "princely self-interest. From 1002, and increasingly from 1077, the princes claimed to be able to "act as a group for the realm [...] and to assert themselves as the general public against special interests". As a result, the empire became "an association capable of acting even without the king. With this view, Keller opposed the older scholarly opinion that the princes were the "gravediggers of the realm" whose behaviour in the Middle Ages had contributed to the decline of royal central authority.

Keller's account of the High Middle Ages in the second volume of the Propylaea History of Germany (1986) was highly acclaimed in medieval research. The book is divided into three main parts: The Salian Empire in the Upheaval of the Early Medieval World (1024-1152) (pp. 57–216), The Reorganization of Living Conditions in the Development of Human Thought and Action (pp. 219–371) and The German Empire between World Empire, Papal Authority and Princely Power (1152-1250) (pp. 375–500). In his account, Keller no longer interpreted the conflicts in the Salian and Hohenstaufen period as disputes between royalty and nobility but described the "royal rule in and above the rank dispute between the magnates". Fighting rebellions was an essential part of Salian governance. According to Keller, conflicts arose whenever there was a threat of changes in the hierarchy and power structure. When offices or fiefs had to be redistributed after the death of their holders, disputes arose. But it was also a central task of the king to settle local conflicts. In contrast to historians such as Egon Boshof or Stefan Weinfurter, Keller did not regard the increasing criticism of Henry III's reign in the last decade of his reign as a sign of a fundamental crisis, since otherwise, the entire Ottonian and Salian period would have to be described as an epoch of crisis.

In a lecture given in September 2000 and published in 2006, Keller notes a change in social values in the 12th century. He observes a clearer emergence of the individual personality in society. At the same time, there was a change in the political order, which integrated the personal existence of people more strongly than before into universally valid norms. According to Keller, these two developments belong together as complementary phenomena. He cites numerous political and social changes to support his thesis of an interweaving of communal order and individual responsibility. Since the twelfth century, the oath had not only taken on greater significance, but by swearing it, the individual now bound himself to the whole of the political community. From the twelfth century onwards, an innovation in the oath was a self-binding commitment to the principles of community life. In addition, not only the legal system changed in the 12th century, but above all the concept of law. In criminal law, the understanding of punishment and guilt had changed: Acts committed under personal responsibility were no longer to be compensated with a compositio, but rather punished with a just penalty graded according to the severity of the offence. Keller devoted further publications to the changes and upheavals of the 12th century.

== Scientific repercussions ==
Keller's analysis of Ottonian kingship, his constitutional and regional historical observations on how kingship penetrated a territory, his research on rituals and conflicts, and his comments on charters and seals as vehicles of communication between rulers and recipients of charters have played a significant role in the reassessment of high medieval kingship that began in the 1980s. Hans-Werner Goetz (2003), for example, sees early medieval kingship as primarily characterized by ritual and the representation of power.

Keller's 1982 findings on the exercise of royal rule, which encompassed all parts of the empire around 1000, have been widely accepted by scholars. In 2012, however, Steffen Patzold, in contrast to Keller's view of the integration of the southern German duchies, considered Swabia to be a peripheral zone of the empire even under Henry II, since not a single synod that met in the presence of Henry II took place in Swabia. The celebration of a high feast (Christmas, Easter, and Pentecost), which was regarded as an act of royal representation and exercise of power, took place only once in Swabia. Patzold also referred to the documentary material: only five percent of all the charters of Henry II were issued in Swabia.

The interpretation of charters as visual media advocated by Keller and his research group has become generally accepted in historical scholarship. More recent works hardly perceive charters as mere texts. The work that emerged from the project "The writing process and its carriers in northern Italy" between 1986 and 1999 has so far only been selectively received in Italian medieval research - probably mainly for linguistic reasons.

In 2001, August Nitschke argued against overemphasizing the contrast between "Carolingian statehood" and Ottonian "royal rule without a state". He concludes: "The transition from Carolingian statehood to the personal rule of the Ottonians, to a 'personal association state', does not need to be explained; for this 'statehood' did not exist under the Carolingians. In other studies, such as those by Roman Deutinger and Steffen Patzold, the contrast between the forms of rule in the Carolingian and Ottonian periods emphasized by Keller is seen as far less profound.

Keller's and Althoff's research on amicitia alliances and oaths, polycentric rule, written culture, rituals, and symbols has added considerably to our knowledge. Their views have been widely accepted in contemporary medieval studies of the Ottonians. Her dual biography of Henry I and Otto the Great, published in 1985, was supplemented in 2008 by Wolfgang Giese's biography to reflect the current state of research. In a work published in 2001, Jutta Schlick examined the royal elections and court days from 1056 to 1159, primarily on the basis of Keller's research. In her post-doctoral thesis, published in Passau in 2003, Elke Goez dealt with pragmatic writing by examining "the administrative and archival practice of the Cistercians, their handling of their own documentary and administrative records".

Most of Keller's students were also members of the Münster Collaborative Research Center; their positions were funded by the German Research Foundation as part of the Collaborative Research Center. The investigations therefore remained strongly focused on the topic of the research project headed by Keller, "The writing process and its carriers in Upper Italy". This allowed a "school" to develop in Münster in the sense of a circle of students with a common field of research: Roland Rölker examined the role of different families in the Contado (the area claimed as a dominion and economic area) and in the municipality of Modena, Nikolai Wandruszka analyzed the social development of Bologna in the High Middle Ages, Thomas Behrmann traced the writing process from the 11th to the 13th century on the basis of the two document collections in Novara, the cathedral chapter of S. Maria and the chapter of the Basilica of S. Gaudenzio, which was separated from it.

Jörg W. Busch worked on the historiography of Milan from the late 11th to the early 14th century, Petra Koch on the Vercellese municipal statutes of 1241 and 1341, and Peter Lütke Westhues on the Veronese municipal statutes of 1228 and 1276. Patrizia Carmassi analyzed the use and application of liturgical books in the ecclesiastical institutions of the city of Milan from the Carolingian period to the 14th century, Thomas Scharff traced the use of writing in the context of the Inquisition in several contributions, Christoph Dartmann researched the beginnings of the Milanese commune (1050–1140), the consular commune of Genoa in the 12th century and the municipal commune of Florence around 1300, and Petra Schulte dealt with the trust in Upper Italian notarial deeds of the 12th and 13th centuries. Petra Schulte dealt with the trust in the Upper Italian notarial deeds of the 12th and 13th centuries.

== Writings ==
A list of his writings appeared in: Thomas Scharff, Thomas Behrmann (eds.): Bene vivere in communitate. Contributions to the Italian and German Middle Ages. Hagen Keller's 60th birthday presented by his students. Waxmann, Münster 1997, ISBN 3-89325-470-6, p. 311-319.

Monographs

- Die Ottonen. 6., aktualisierte Auflage. Beck, Munich 2021, ISBN 978-3-406-77413-3.
- with Gerd Althoff: Die Zeit der späten Karolinger und der Ottonen. Krisen und Konsolidierungen 888–1024. 10., completely revised edition. Klett-Cotta, Stuttgart 2008, ISBN 978-3-608-60003-2.
- Ottonische Königsherrschaft. Organisation und Legitimation königlicher Macht. Scientific Book Society, Darmstadt 2002, ISBN 3-534-15998-5.
- Zwischen regionaler Begrenzung und universalem Horizont. Deutschland im Imperium der Salier und Staufer 1024 bis 1250 (= Propyläen-Geschichte Deutschlands. Volume 2). Propylaea Publishing House, Berlin 1986, ISBN 3-549-05812-8.
- with Gerd Althoff: Heinrich I. und Otto der Große. Neubeginn auf karolingischem Erbe. Muster-Schmidt, Göttingen et al. 1985, ISBN 3-7881-0122-9.
- Adelsherrschaft und städtische Gesellschaft in Oberitalien. 9. bis 12. Jahrhundert (= Bibliothek des Deutschen Historischen Instituts in Rom. Bd. 52). Niemeyer, Tübingen 1979, ISBN 3-484-80088-7 (Partly simultaneously: Freiburg (Breisgau), Postdoctoral thesis, 1971, with the title: Senioren und Vasallen, Capitane und Valvassoren. T. 1).
- Kloster Einsiedeln im ottonischen Schwaben (= Forschungen zur oberrheinischen Landesgeschichte. Volume 13). Alber, Freiburg i. Br. 1964.

Editorships

- with Marita Blattmann: Träger der Verschriftlichung und Strukturen der Überlieferung in oberitalienischen Kommunen des 12. und 13. Jahrhunderts (= Wissenschaftliche Schriften der WWU Münster. Volume 25). Westphalian Wilhelms University, Münster 2016, ISBN 3-8405-0142-3.
- with Christel Meier, Volker Honemann, Rudolf Suntrup: Pragmatische Dimensionen mittelalterlicher Schriftkultur. Akten des Internationalen Kolloquiums Münster 26.–29. Mai 1999 (= Münstersche Mittelalter-Schriften. Volume 79). Fink, München 2002, ISBN 3-7705-3778-5 (Digitized version).
- with Christel Meier, Thomas Scharff: Schriftlichkeit und Lebenspraxis im Mittelalter. Erfassen, Bewahren, Verändern (Akten des internationalen Kolloquiums 8.–10. Juni 1995) (= Münstersche Mittelalter-Schriften. Volume 76). Fink, München 1999, ISBN 3-7705-3365-8 (Digitized version).
- with Franz Neiske: Vom Kloster zum Klosterverband. Das Werkzeug der Schriftlichkeit. Akten des Internationalen Kolloquiums des Projekts L 2 im SFB 231, 22.–23. Februar 1996 (= Münstersche Mittelalter-Schriften. Volume 74). Fink, Munich 1997, ISBN 3-7705-3222-8 (Digitized version).
- with Thomas Behrmann: Kommunales Schriftgut in Oberitalien. Formen, Funktionen, Überlieferung (= Münstersche Mittelalter-Schriften. Volume 68). Fink, Munich 1995, ISBN 3-7705-2944-8.
- with Klaus Grubmüller, Nikolaus Staubach: Pragmatische Schriftlichkeit im Mittelalter. Erscheinungsformen und Entwicklungsstufen (Akten des internationalen Kolloquiums, 17.–19. Mai 1989) (= Münstersche Mittelalter-Schriften. Volume 65). Fink, Munich 1992, ISBN 3-7705-2710-0 (Digitized version).

== Bibliography ==
- Gerd Althoff: Der Schrift-Gelehrte. Zum sechzigsten Geburtstag des Historikers Hagen Keller. In: Frankfurter Allgemeine Zeitung, May 2, 1997, No. 101, p. 40.
- Christoph Dartmann, Thomas Scharff, Christoph Friedrich Weber (Ed.): Zwischen Pragmatik und Performanz. Dimensionen mittelalterlicher Schriftkultur (= Utrecht studies in medieval literacy. Volume 18). Brepols, Turnhout 2011, ISBN 978-2-503-54137-2.
- Thomas Scharff, Thomas Behrmann (Ed.): Bene vivere in communitate: Beiträge zum italienischen und deutschen Mittelalter. Hagen Keller zum 60. Geburtstag überreicht von seinen Schülerinnen und Schülern. Waxmann, Münster 1997, ISBN 3-89325-470-6.
- Keller, Hagen. In: Kürschners Deutscher Gelehrtenkalender. Bio-bibliographisches Verzeichnis deutschsprachiger Wissenschaftler der Gegenwart. Volume 2: H – L. 26th edition. de Gruyter, Berlin et al. 2014, ISBN 978-3-11-030257-8, p. 1730 f.
- Hagen Keller. In: Jürgen Petersohn (Ed.): Der Konstanzer Arbeitskreis für mittelalterliche Geschichte. Die Mitglieder und ihr Werk. Eine bio-bibliographische Dokumentation (= Veröffentlichungen des Konstanzer Arbeitskreises für Mittelalterliche Geschichte aus Anlass seines fünfzigjährigen Bestehens 1951–2001. Volume 2). Thorbecke, Stuttgart 2001, ISBN 3-7995-6906-5, p. 217–224 (online).
- Wer ist wer? Das deutsche Who’s Who. LI. 2013/2014 edition, p. 547.
