= Stefan Weinfurter =

German historian

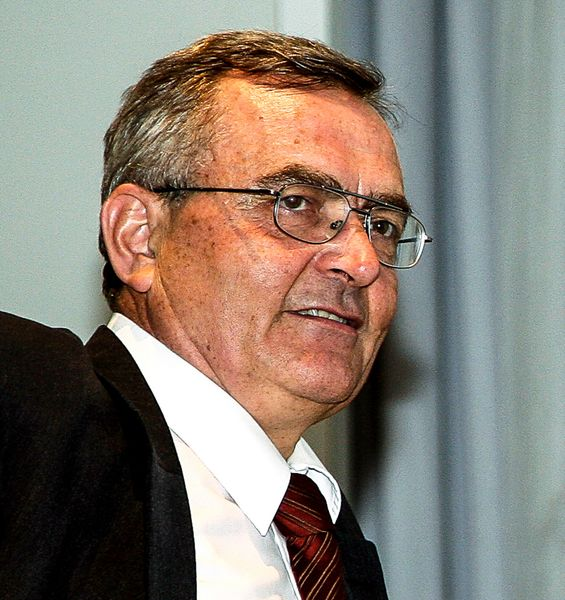
Stefan Weinfurter, photographed by Ernst-Dieter Hehl in 2006

Stefan Weinfurter (June 24, 1945 – August 27, 2018) was a German historian who researched the history of the Early and High Middle Ages.

Weinfurter held chairs in medieval history at the Catholic University of Eichstätt-Ingolstadt (1982–1987), the University of Mainz (1987–1994), LMU Munich (1994–1999) and Heidelberg University (1999–2013). His books, for example on the two holy emperors of the Middle Ages, Charlemagne and Henry II, on the empire in the Middle Ages or on Emperor Henry IV's road to Canossa, have been widely read. He introduced the concept of "configurations of order", which describes the coexistence and opposition of medieval orders, into the medievalist discussion. From the 1990s on, he and Bernd Schneidmüller played a leading role in almost all major medieval exhibitions in Germany. As editor of the scholarly volumes accompanying the Rhineland-Palatinate state exhibition "Das Reich der Salier 1024-1125" in Speyer in 1992 and through numerous other publications, Weinfurter proved himself to be one of the best experts on the era of the Salian emperors.

== Life ==
=== Early years ===
Stefan Weinfurter was born in 1945 in Prachatitz, South Bohemia, to Julius Weinfurter, a teacher, and his wife Renata, née Lumbe Edle von Mallonitz (1922–2008), who came from a family of lawyers. His maternal ancestor Josef Thaddeus Lumbe von Mallonitz was ennobled in 1867. Weinfurter's father was drafted into military service during World War II and became an American prisoner. He died on May 8, 1945, the day of the German Instrument of Surrender, in the Prisoner of War camp Büderich. After being expelled from Czechoslovakia in February 1946, Weinfurter grew up with his mother in Hechendorf am Pilsensee, then in Munich and Geretsried from 1958. His Bohemian origins and family reintegration left a lasting impression on Weinfurter.

He graduated from the high school Karlsgymnasium in Munich in July 1966. Stefan Weinfurter then studied physics at the Technical University of Munich for one semester in 1966/67. He then began studying history, German language and literature, and education at LMU Munich in the summer semester of 1967, graduating in the summer semester of 1971. He took the proseminar in medieval history with Johannes Spörl, with whom he became a student assistant following the proseminar paper on Charles IV. In 1970 Weinfurter passed the state examination in Munich. From the winter semester of 1971/72 to the winter semester of 1972/73, he studied history and German at the University of Cologne. In 1971/72 he became an assistant to Odilo Engels. Weinfurter received his doctorate from the latter in the summer semester of 1973 with a thesis on the Salzburg bishopric reform and episcopal politics in the 12th century. From 1973 to 1974 he worked as a research assistant at the University of Cologne, and from 1974 to 1981 as an academic councilor or senior councilor. Weinfurter abandoned the originally planned habilitation project on the history of the Duchy of Bavaria in the early and high Middle Ages. In 1980 he habilitated instead in Cologne with an annotated edition of the order of life of a Limburg monastery of the regulated Canons Regular of St. Augustine from the 12th century. In 1981/82 he represented the chair of medieval history at the University of Heidelberg, which had become vacant due to the death of Peter Classen.

=== Chairs in Eichstätt, Mainz, Munich and Heidelberg ===
In 1982, at the age of 36, he was appointed to the newly founded Catholic University of Eichstätt-Ingolstadt. There he taught as a professor of regional history with special emphasis on Bavaria until 1987. In Gaimersheim, the family found their new home. His inaugural lecture in Eichstätt in November 1983 was on the history of Eichstätt in Ottonian-Salian times. During this time he deepened approaches to regional history and expanded his medieval teaching profile into Bavarian contemporary and economic history. Almost every year during this period he published an essay on the episcopal history of Eichstätt from its beginnings, the work of St. Willibald of Eichstätt in the 8th century, to the 14th century. In several years, an edition of bishops' chronicles (Gesta episcoporum) was produced in collaboration with students. In the 1980s, intensive construction activity began in Eichstätt. The deep interventions in the historic city center exposed unique archaeological material. The find sites and the evaluation possibilities of the excavating neighboring discipline aroused his interest. Weinfurter's close collaboration with representatives of architectural history and urban archaeology developed. From 1985 to 1987 he was Dean of the Faculty of History and Social Sciences in Eichstätt. As dean, he organized the relocation of the campuses scattered throughout the city to the buildings in Universitätsallee, which were gradually ready for occupancy from 1986. He was a member of the Eichstätt University Council between 2007 and 2011.

In 1987, Weinfurter accepted an appointment at the University of Mainz. As successor to Alfons Becker, he taught medieval history and auxiliary sciences of history there until 1994. During this time, his work focused on the Salian ruling dynasty of the 11th century and thus on the kingship of the German High Middle Ages. Since he was significantly involved in the organization of the large Salian exhibition in Speyer, the mediation of history also became one of his most important fields of activity. In 1993, he turned down a call to Cologne to succeed his academic teacher Engels as professor of medieval history. From 1994 to 1999, he succeeded Eduard Hlawitschka as professor of medieval history at LMU Munich. In 1996, he organized the German Historians' Conference "History as Argument" in Munich. During his time in Munich, people became the focus of his research. Weinfurter drew increasingly on pictorial sources in his research. In 1999, he published a biography of Henry II, followed by books and numerous essays on the Salian period, the Hohenstaufen dynasty, the road to Canossa and medieval imperial history.

In the fall of 1999, he was appointed to succeed Hermann Jakobs as Professor of Medieval History and Ancillary Historical Sciences at Heidelberg University. An important reason for accepting the call was the proximity to his family in Mainz. He gave his inaugural lecture in Heidelberg in June 2000 on configurations of order using the example of Henry III. At Heidelberg University, Weinfurter's main areas of work were added to by rituals as well as cultural encounters during the Crusades. Weinfurter's move to Heidelberg University came at a time when collaborative research was becoming increasingly important as a funding instrument of the German Research Foundation. Together with Schneidmüller, Weinfurter was able to successfully exploit the new funding opportunities for Heidelberg University. This created a variety of opportunities for young scholars. As a result, Heidelberg University developed into an important center of medieval research during these years. At Heidelberg University, Weinfurter was a member and subproject leader in the Collaborative Research Centres 619 "Ritual Dynamics" (until 2013) and "Material Text Cultures" (2009–2013). He also led a sub-project in the DFG Priority Program 1173 "Integration and Disintegration of Cultures in the European Middle Ages" (2005–2011). Together with Gert Melville and Bernd Schneidmüller, he directed the Heidelberg Academy project "Monasteries in the High Middle Ages. Innovation Laboratories of European Life Designs and Models of Order". From 2004 to 2006, Weinfurter served as Dean of the Faculty of Philosophy at Heidelberg University. From 1999 to 2013, he was director of the Institute for Franconian-Palatinate History and Regional Studies at Heidelberg University. On the occasion of his 65th birthday, a conference was held in Heidelberg from June 23 to 25, 2010, the contributions of which were published in 2013. Most of the individual studies deal with the development of political order and its conceptualization in the 13th century. He became emeritus professor at Heidelberg University in 2013. Under Weinfurter's supervision as an academic teacher, 16 dissertations were completed. His most important academic students included Stefan Burkhardt, Jürgen Dendorfer, Jan Keupp and Thomas Wetzstein. From January 2013, Weinfurter was head of the Research Center for History and Cultural Heritage (FGKE) at the Villa Poensgen in Heidelberg, and from September 1, 2013, he was a senior professor at Heidelberg University.

Weinfurter was married from 1970. He remained a resident of Mainz even while teaching at LMU Munich and Heidelberg University. He had been particularly fascinated by the cities and imperial cathedrals in Speyer, Worms and Mainz. He died of heart failure at home in Mainz on August 27, 2018, at the age of 73. He left behind a wife, three daughters, and seven grandchildren.

== Research focus ==
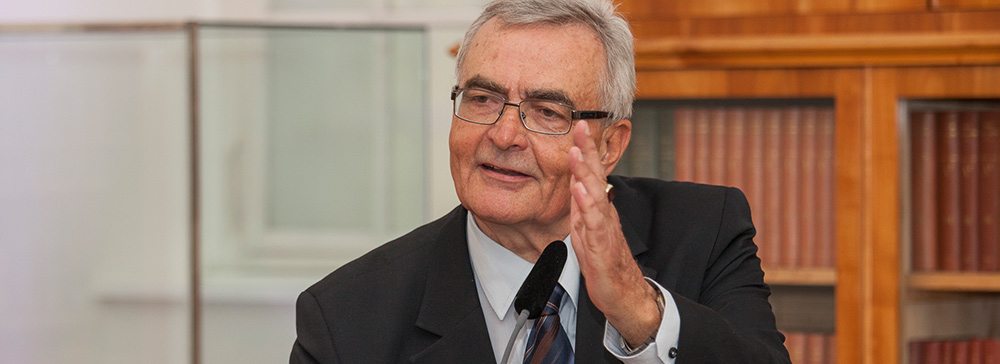
Stefan Weinfurter at an event of the Austrian Academy of Sciences

Weinfurter produced over 200 publications in the period from 1974 until his death in 2018. His research covered imperial and rulership history in the Ottonian, Salian, and Hohenstaufen periods, configurations of order in the European framework, rituals and communication in politics and society, regional and ecclesiastical history in the Middle Ages and early modern period, the history of religious orders in the High Middle Ages, and images as historical sources. A close collaboration in Weinfurter's research occurred in the mid-1990s with Bernd Schneidmüller. With his academic teacher Odilo Engels, he edited four volumes of the Series episcoporum ecclesiae catholicae occidentalis (1982, 1984, 1991, 1992), a prosopography of the early and high medieval bishops. In 1982, Weinfurter gave a programmatic overview of the problems and possibilities of a prosopography of the early and high medieval episcopate at the first interdisciplinary conference on medieval prosopography in Bielefeld. Among other things, the wide-ranging spatial and temporal objectives proved to be particularly difficult.

22 of Weinfurter's essays, published between 1976 and 2002, were bundled in an anthology in 2005 on the occasion of his 60th birthday. The editors had chosen these essays because they present Weinfurter's "explanatory model of order reality and order conception in condensed form [...]."

=== Church and canon reform in the 11th and 12th centuries ===
His first work was devoted to the regular canons. His dissertation, published in 1975, dealt with the spiritual new beginning in Salzburg. In doing so, he wanted to work out "the characteristic development, shaping and significance of individual reform groups" using the example of the Salzburg ecclesiastical province. In research, the main initiator of the reform movement has long been considered to be Salzburg's Archbishop Conrad I. According to Weinfurter, Konrad's first reform measures can already be dated before his return from exile in Saxony (1121), namely in Reichersberg and in Maria Saal. Conrad intended not only a clergy reform, "but a complete reorganization of the diocese, characterized by a new system of relations, which was to determine the ecclesiastical constitution in this diocese."

Weinfurter illuminated the self-image of the reform canons by means of a prologue to the rule of St. Augustine written in the Salzburg area in the 12th century. Weinfurter intensively researched the Premonstratensians, with special attention to Norbert of Xanten.

=== Biographies of Henry II and Charlemagne ===
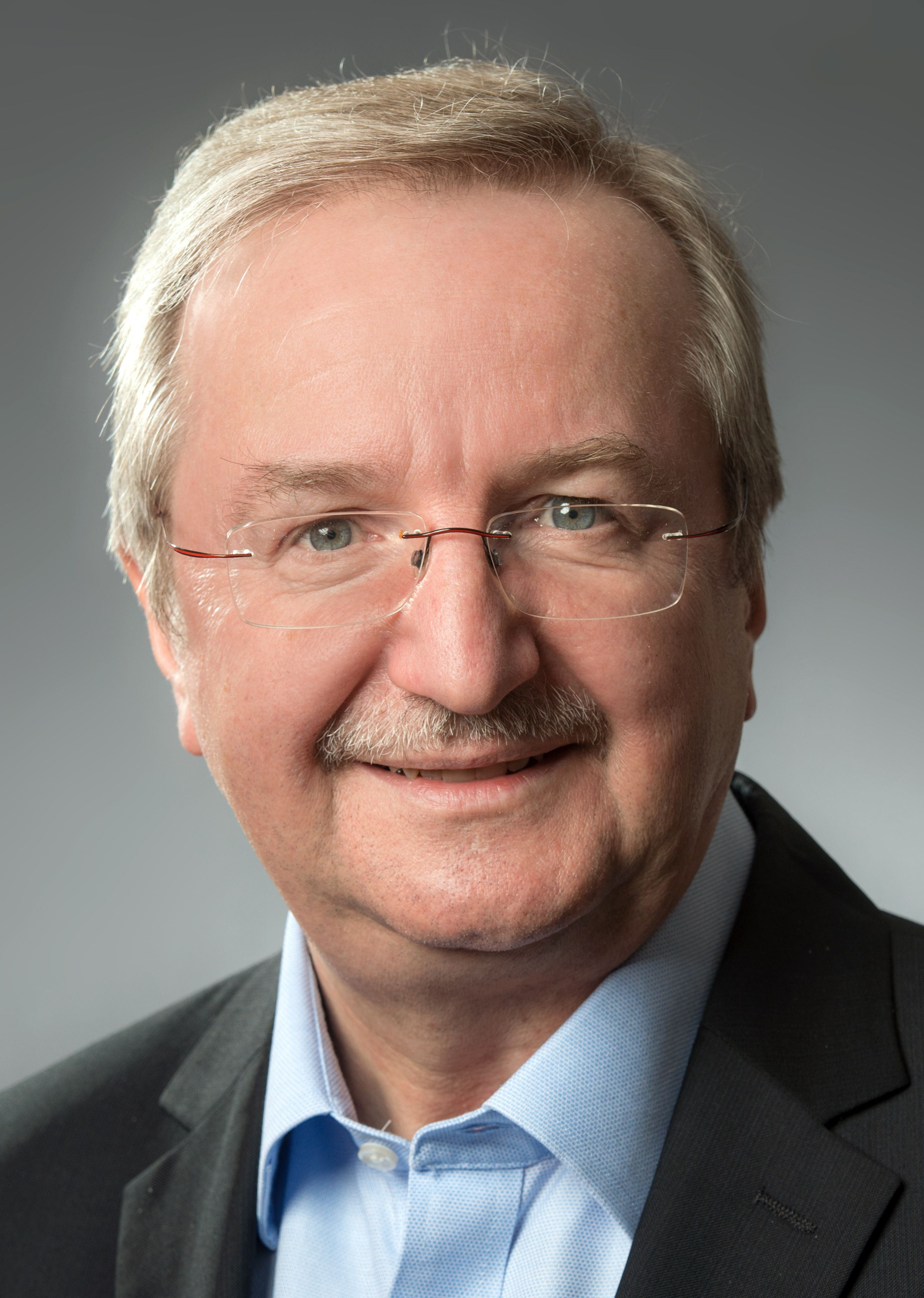
Bernd Schneidmüller in 2017. A close collaboration developed between Weinfurter and Schneidmüller in Heidelberg.

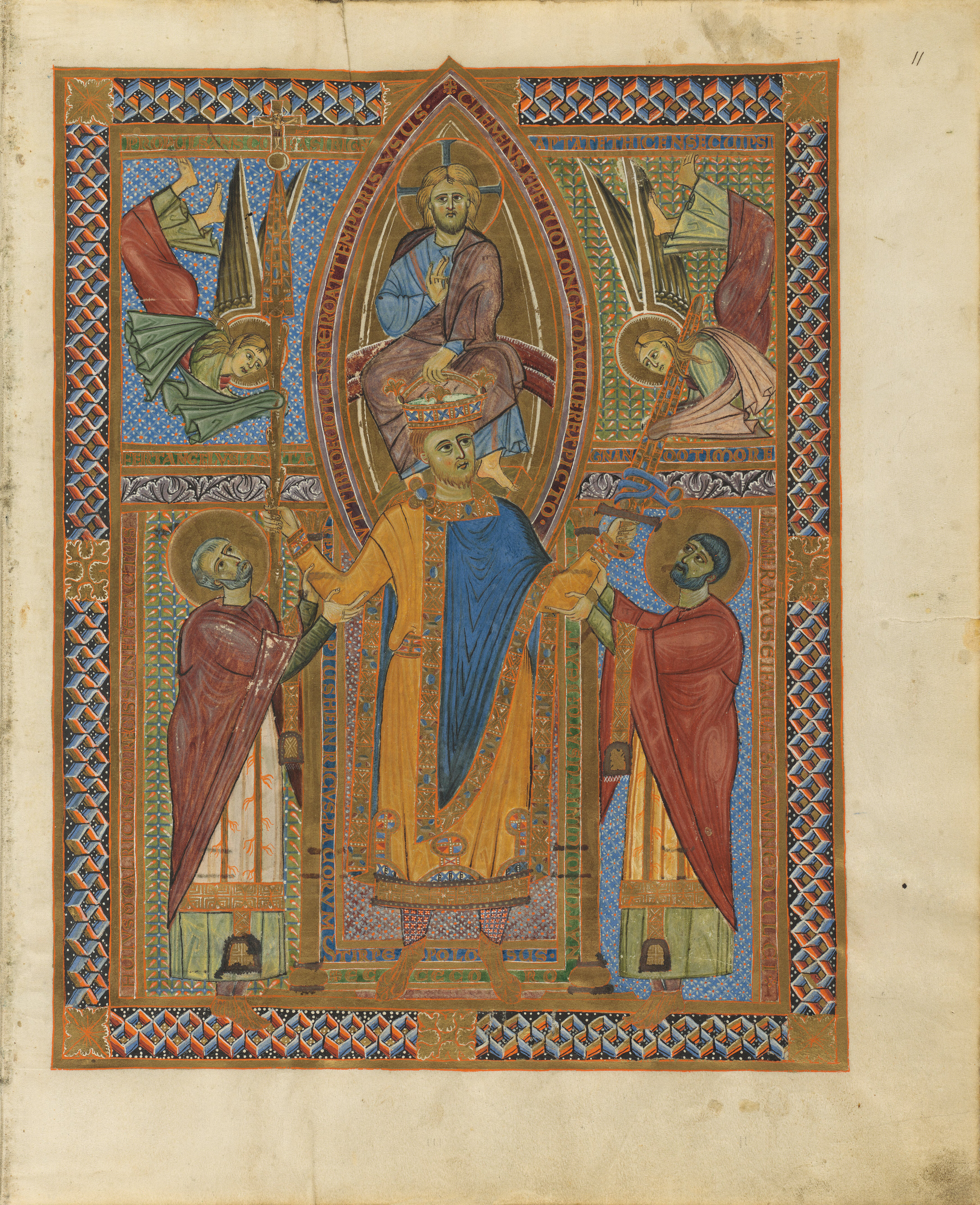
Coronation picture from the Regensburg Sacramentary. Henry II donated the Regensburg Sacramentary to Bamberg Cathedral. Miniature from the Sacramentary of Henry II, today in the Bavarian State Library in Munich (Clm 4456, fol. 11r).

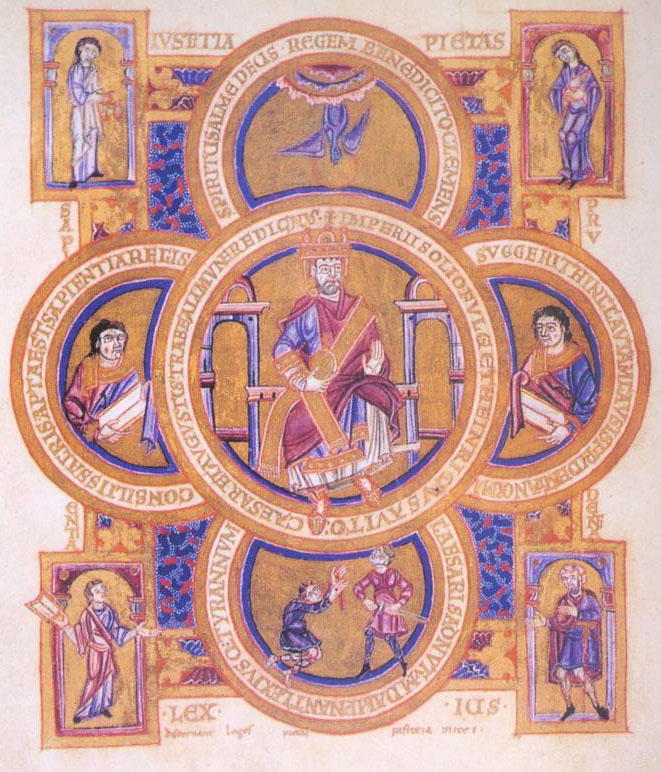
Henry II (or Henry III?) in the Evangeliary of Montecassino (Rome, Biblioteca Apostolica Vaticana, Codex Ottob. lat. 74, fol. 193v)

The starting point for the years-long study of Henry II was the study Die Zentralisierung der Herrschaftsgewalt im Reich durch Kaiser Heinrich II, published in 1986. The contribution was Weinfurter's colloquium lecture in the context of his habilitation in Cologne. Previous research had often examined Henry II in comparison with his predecessor Otto III. Weinfurter, on the other hand, saw in Henry's conception of rule "to a great extent a continuation and enhancement on the royal level of the elements developed in ducal rule." The nearly sixty-page study was methodologically innovative not only because it linked national and imperial history, but also because it was at the beginning of the observable return in the 1980s of a preoccupation in medieval studies with the acting individuals. The Bamberg conference in June 1996 on the continuities and discontinuities in the reigns of Otto III and Henry II, organized with Bernd Schneidmüller, proved particularly fruitful for his biography. Weinfurter published the contributions together with Schneidmüller in 1997. The account was at the same time the first volume of a new series of publications (medieval research) edited by Schneidmüller and Weinfurter, which aims to "take up innovative questions of modern mediaevistics in their entire breadth and, if possible, to interest a wider audience in them." His account of Henry II, published in 1999, was the first comprehensive biography since the "Jahrbüchern der Deutschen Geschichte" by Siegfried Hirsch and Harry Bresslau (1862/75). The work is not chronological but deals with the following aspects in individual chapters: Imperial structure, the idea of kingship, marriage/childlessness, court and advisors, relationship to the imperial church, monastic policy, conflicts with the Greats, foreign relations to the east and west, Italy and the imperial state, and Bamberg. In his biography, Stefan Weinfurter particularly emphasized the increased expectation of the end times and the biblical guiding figure Moses for Henry's reign. He explained the long-standing conflicts with the Polish king Bolesław Chrobry with similar views of rule, since both saw themselves chosen by God to convey the divine commandments to their people and they wanted to align their entire rule with these commandments. In this context, he also conceded great importance to images as historical sources. Thus, according to his research, the Regensburg Sacramentary played a special role. Weinfurter understood the image as an expression of an increased sacral claim to legitimacy by the king beyond the political power structure. It was primarily from this image that Weinfurter derived a special "idea of kingship" linked to Moses. According to Ludger Körntgen, this claim appears problematic, since Moses is not drawn as a royal figure in the Old Testament. In Henry II's pericope book, according to Weinfurter, "the legitimacy of Henry's claim to kingship" is visualized. In the pericopes of Henry II, Moses is depicted as a king. Unlike Hagen Keller, Weinfurter tends to see Henry II and not Henry III on the image of the ruler shown in the Montecassino Gospels. Weinfurter justified this, among other things, with the fact that according to the tradition of Montecassino, Emperor Henry II donated a precious Gospels book to the abbey. No information has survived about Henry III in this regard.

Weinfurter disagreed with Ludger Körntgen regarding the conflict behavior and individuality of the ruler Henry II. Körntgen assumed an "interplay of 'rule and conflict' that is said to have determined the Ottonian-early Salian epoch beyond the individual possibilities of different ruler personalities." According to Weinfurter, Henry's behavior, on the other hand, "can only be explained from his very individual conception of the legitimacy, task, and function of his kingship, which is rooted in his ruler personality." Weinfurter's view is that the ruler's behavior was not a matter of the ruler's personality. For the jubilee year 2002 Weinfurter dealt in an essay with the origin and the personal environment of Cunigunde, the wife of Heinrich. Weinfurter attributed an important meaning to her coronation on August 10, 1002, in Paderborn on the one hand as a "signal for the Saxons" by choosing Paderborn as the place of coronation, and on the other hand as the first independent queenly coronation. Kunigunde had acted "in an almost complete, harmonious unison with the goals and ideas of her husband."

On the occasion of Charlemagne's anniversary in 2014, Weinfurter published a biography on Charlemagne. Until then, Weinfurter had hardly stood out with his own works on the Carolingian period. The biography was translated into Italian in 2015. After an overview of the source material and the early Carolingians, Weinfurter treated Charlemagne's reign not chronologically, but systematically according to levels of action (wars, domestic politics, family, educational reform, church policy, and emperorship). As guiding ideas for Charlemagne's actions, Weinfurter identifies a "grand project of unification" and a "Christianization of the state". With his thesis of "unification", which runs through all twelve chapters of the account, Weinfurter means "the interpretive sovereignty in religious and moral behavior", "the unambiguity of language, argumentation and temporal order" as well as that of "political, military and ecclesiastical organization." Charlemagne's constant striving for unambiguity stands in contrast to the indeterminacy or ambiguity in our contemporary society.

=== National and church history ===
==== Eichstätt diocesan history ====
In the late 1980s and early 1990s, Weinfurter published several articles on the medieval history of the bishopric of Eichstätt, thus giving new impetus to the long-fallen research field of Eichstätt's episcopal history. In 1987 he presented an edition of the Geschichte der Eichstätter Bischöfe by Anonymus Haserensis based on the only surviving medieval manuscript (Diözesanarchiv Eichstätt, MS 18) of the late 15th century. Until then, the most important work on the Eichstätt diocesan history of the early and high Middle Ages was only available in the MGH edition (MGH SS 7, pp. 254-266) by Ludwig Konrad Bethmann (1784–1867) from 1846. Weinfurter's new edition facilitates access to a much-used work. Together with Harald Dickerhof, he organized a conference in Eichstätt in the summer of 1987 on the 1200th anniversary of the death of St. Willibald, the contributions to which were published in 1990. Weinfurter himself discussed the three approaches to the origin of the diocese. He rejected the early approach of 741 and, together with Dickerhoff, argued for the years 751/52 as the founding date for the diocese. In 2010, a volume on the medieval history of the diocese of Eichstätt was published, bundling six contributions by Weinfurter from the years 1987-1992.

==== Mainz, Speyer and Lorsch ====
In close connection with his research on the Salians, Weinfurter also published several studies dealing with Speyer and the cathedral there. In addition, Weinfurter devoted himself to Mainz and Lorsch. Thus, he investigated the dissolution of the Benedictine Lorsch Abbey in late Hohenstaufen times. The demise of the monastery was justified by Pope Innocent IV and the Archbishop of Mainz Siegfried II with the moral decline of the monks. According to Weinfurter's source analysis, the power struggle between the archbishop of Mainz and the count palatine was decisive. Politically, the archbishop of Mainz had driven the demise of the monastery in the winter of 1226/27 through the rebellion of the Lorsch ministerials on Starkenburg against their abbot. In recent years, he devoted himself primarily to Carolingian Lorsch and its monastic library. With Bernd Schneidmüller, Weinfurter had institutionalized the cooperation between the Institute for Franconian-Palatinate History and Regional Studies and the World Heritage Site of Lorsch in 2005. As part of the Collaborative Research Center 933 "Materiale Textkulturen" and in cooperation with Heidelberg University Library, a conference was held in Lorsch Monastery in 2012. The handling of knowledge in Carolingian Lorsch was examined. Weinfurter co-edited the results of this anthology, which was published in 2015.

In the field of Mainz history, for example, Weinfurter dealt with the background of the murder of Archbishop Arnold of Mainz. He identified Gernold, Arnold's chaplain and notary, as the author of the archbishop's vita. In another paper he concluded, based on linguistic parallels, that the Vita Arnoldi, a letter of Archbishop Arnold to Wibald of Stablo from spring 1155, and the mandate of Emperor Frederick I (DFI 289) have the same author - that is, Gernot. The conflict between the citizens of Mainz and their archbishop was understood by Weinfurter as a consequence of Arnold's understanding of the law. The archbishop had been guided strictly by standardized law and had rejected compromise. Weinfurter's student Stefan Burkhardt presented the Vita Arnoldi archiepiscopi Moguntinensis (The biography of Archbishop Arnold of Selenhofen of Mainz) in an annotated new edition with translation in 2014. Thus, one of the most important sources on the history of the high medieval Middle Rhine region has been made accessible to the public. Burkhardt comes to the same conclusion as Weinfurter, that the chaplain Gernot must have written the text and did so immediately after the murder of the archbishop. Also in 2014, Weinfurter published an article on the Vita and Memoria of Arnold von Selenhofen.

=== Salian period ===
Weinfurter is also considered a special expert on the Salian period, which he honored in his research as a special period of upheaval and threshold. From 1988 to 1991, he was commissioned to prepare and edit the historical publications for the large exhibition "The Salians and their Empire" in Speyer, organized by the state of Rhineland-Palatinate. Under Weinfurter's direction, 48 authors could be won for cooperation. Their results were published by Weinfurter in 1991 in three scientific accompanying volumes. In 1991, he published Herrschaft und Reich der Salier. Grundlinien einer Umbruchzeit, which was translated into English by Barbara Bowlus in America in 1999. In September 1991 he organized a conference in Trier on reform ideas and reform politics in late Salian and early Baptist times. The contributions appeared a year later. There he presented a fundamental reassessment of the Salian emperor Henry V. According to his argumentation, reform-religious motives of the conspirators and less power-political interests were the motives of Henry V for the deprivation of power of his father Henry IV. Only by an alliance with these reform forces, Henry had been able to secure the succession to the rule.

900 years after the death of Emperor Henry IV, a symposium was held in May 2006 at the site of his Burial ground in Speyer by the Salisches Kaisertum und neues Europa. The proceedings, edited by Weinfurter and Bernd Schneidmüller in 2007, bring together 18 contributions. By adopting an emphatically European perspective, the aim is to overcome the empire-centered interpretation of "an old German theme" and to achieve a new understanding based on European levels of comparison. In his summary of the results, Weinfurter emphasized the "increase in efficiency in all areas." In 2004, Weinfurter published Das Jahrhundert der Salier. (1024–1125), an account aimed at a broader audience.

=== Order configurations in the Middle Ages ===
Weinfurter coined the term "configurations of order" for the 11th century, which describes the coexistence and opposition of medieval orders. In 1998 he organized a conference in Cologne on the topic Stauferreich im Wandel. Ordnungsvorstellungen und Politik vor und nach Venedig (1177). The starting point was the question of whether a relevant change in the political and conceptual order configurations of the empire took place in Frederick I's time and what role the events at the Peace of Venice played in this. In this context, Weinfurter also used the phrase "power and conceptions of order in the High Middle Ages" for the first time. In 2001, he dealt with the time of Henry III in the treatise "Order Configurations in Conflict." In the time of the emperor, "the configurations of order entered into such fierce competition with each other that the integrating power of the sacral ruler broke - and broke forever." Thus, his "reign simultaneously ushered in the demise of a configuration of order in which the religious commandment of order was centered entirely on the king and formed the basis of kingship." Together with Bernd Schneidmüller, he organized a Reichenau conference of the Constance Working Group for Medieval History on "Order Configurations" in the fall of 2003. With this conference, a "research design" was tested in the academic discussion. This was intended to release the traditional concept of constitution in medieval studies from its static nature. "Configurations of order" comprise "not only concepts, but also ways, models, and forms of the real implementation of certain concepts of values and order and [...] their repercussions." It is about the "interrelation of imagined and established order." Weinfurter recognized a "significant caesura" in the conflict between Henry IV and Henry V, as an altered social order structure became visible.

For Weinfurter, in an article published in 2002, the failure of negotiations between Henry V and Pope Paschal II in 1111 and the Peace of Venice in 1177 were turning points in history. Under Henry V, "the reform-religious community of responsibility between king and princes broke down." With the Peace of Venice, imperial authority suffered a severe setback. Weinfurter concluded that both times the configurations of order converging on the ruler's authority were weakened to such an extent that the connection to the development of monarchies in Europe finally broke off. In the future, Germany had taken the path toward the federal system.

=== Imperial history ===
Weinfurter published several essays repeatedly devoted to the evaluation of individual persons important for the empire. In 1993, together with Hanna Vollrath, he published 23 contributions to a Festschrift for Odilo Engels on the occasion of his 65th birthday about the city and diocese of Cologne in the empire of the Middle Ages. For Weinfurter, the Cologne archbishop Philip was the driving force in the feudal proceedings against Henry the Lion. This also changed the perception in further research on Frederick Barbarossa at the fall of Henry the Lion. The fall of the lion is no longer judged as the result of a plan single-mindedly pursued by Barbarossa, but rather the emperor appears as a "driven" of the princes in the deprivation of Henry's power. In the 1000th year of Adelheid of Burgundy's death, Weinfurter published a study on Otto the Great's wife in 1999 and attributed great importance to her. For him, Adelheid "took a unique key role for the Ottonian emperorship and appears virtually as the decisive figure in the mediation of the Italic-imperial traditions to the Saxon court."

With Schneidmüller, Weinfurter published an anthology on the German rulers of the Middle Ages in 2003. The work contains 28 short biographical accounts from Henry I to Maximilian I and thus provides an overview of medieval imperial history. Weinfurter also wrote the contributions on Otto III and Henry II. He published a book in 2006 on the causes and consequences of the penitential road to Canossa. In eleven chapters, he described the development that ended with the reign of Henry III and with the Concordat of Worms. Weinfurter interpreted the Investiture controversy as the beginning of a process of secularization, in which "the unity of religious and state order dissolved. In 2008, an account of medieval imperial history was published. Weinfurter focused on the political development from the founding of the empire by the Franks to Emperor Maximilian I. However, he also took into account social, economic, legal, and constitutional history.

The contributions of a conference in honor of Odilo Engels from April 30 to May 2, 1998, were published by Weinfurter in 2002. They deal with the time of Frederick Barbarossa and the political conceptions of that time. In his introduction he asked whether the Peace of Venice had meant a turning point in Barbarossa's time. Weinfurter concluded that the peace treaty not only changed the imperial system, but also opened up the empire in favor of smaller territorial units. In April 2008, on the occasion of Odilo Engels' 80th birthday, a conference was held at the University of Düsseldorf, whose contributions Weinfurter edited in 2012. The individual studies deal with papal history in the period from the 8th to the 13th century, with a clear focus on the 11th and 12th centuries.

In a paper published in 2005, Weinfurter addressed the question of how the Roman-German empire came to be regarded as "sacred." Starting with the formulation sacro imperio et divae rei publicae consulere from a document of Barbarossa from 1157, he traced the development of the idea of empire under Emperor Frederick I. He recognized only rather vague transpersonal concepts of state in his time. On the linguistic level, regnum was not clearly grasped as an institution until the 12th century. Weinfurter saw the explanation for the expression in the fact "that one began to think of the empire as an institution in correspondence to the sancta ecclesia, to the holy church". He identified the learned Abbot Wibald of Stablo as the mediator of this conception of the "holy" emperor and empire. The reason for the effort could be the equivalence of the "holy" empire with Byzantium and even more with the papal church in Rome. For the 200th anniversary of the end of the Old Empire Weinfurter and Schneidmüller published an anthology in 2006. This brings together contributions from leading experts in medieval studies on the Holy Roman Empire and its position within Europe. To the anthology Weinfurter contributed a paper on Vorstellungen und Wirklichkeiten vom Reich des Mittelalters.

=== Rituals and communication in politics and society ===
Weinfurter's other research interests included rituals and communication in politics and society, the formation of political will and forms of its symbolism and presentation. In Speyer in May 2008, together with Bernd Schneidmüller and Wojciech Falkowski, he organized a scientific conference on ritualization of political will formation in the high and late Middle Ages in comparison between Poland and Germany. The contributions of Polish and German medievalists focused on processes of decision-making and strategies of their enforcement in political communication. The anthology of 16 essays was published in 2010.

The Collaborative Research Centres "Ritual Dynamics" (SFB 619) at University of Heidelberg, funded by the German Research Foundation, investigated rituals and their change and dynamics from 2002 to 2013. Together with Schneidmüller, Weinfurter led the subproject B8 "Ritualization of Political Will Formation in the Middle Ages." In 2005, together with Marion Steinicke, he edited the contributions to a conference on the establishment of rulers and their rituals held in October 2003 within the framework of the SFB Ritual Dynamics. Chronologically, the contributions range from the Greek polis to the end of the 20th century. For Weinfurter, the devestiture of Henry the Lion in 1181 was the starting point for his reflections on the changeability of the investiture ritual. For the first time, a ruler could no longer exercise his right of grace, which would have allowed him to invest Henry the Lion again with imperial fiefs. Weinfurter found that the "God-related system of order of grace" effective from Ottonian-Salian times was increasingly displaced by law as a new standard of order in the investiture ritual in the course of the 12th century. As a further result of the SFB, Weinfurter was co-editor of an anthology published in 2005 with 40 short articles on rituals from antiquity to the present day. Weinfurter dealt with the ritual of humility of King Henry II at the Frankfurt Synod on the basis of the description in the chronicle of Thietmar of Merseburg. By repeated prostratio before the 28 assembled bishops, Henry achieved the foundation of the bishopric of Bamberg. In the same volume, he treated the submission (deditio) of Duke Henry of Carinthia with his army in 1122 under the power of Salzburg Archbishop Conrad. In addition, Weinfurter examined the punishment of dog carrier based on the works of Otto of Freising, Widukind of Corvey, Wipo, and the vita of Archbishop Arnold of Mainz. Weinfurter's study Der Papst weint, published in 2010, illustrated how Pope Innocent IV repeatedly wept loudly and publicly at the Council of Lyon in 1245 when deposing Emperor Frederick II, thereby emphasizing the inevitability of his actions.

=== Implementation of historical research in major exhibitions and television ===
Furthermore, Weinfurter was also active in science organization. For many years, the mediation of history in exhibitions and media formed a focal point of Weinfurter's activities. Together with Bernd Schneidmüller and in close cooperation with Alfried Wieczorek and the Reiss-Engelhorn-Museum in Mannheim, but also with the Kulturhistorisches Museum Magdeburg and the Historical Museum of the Palatinate in Speyer, he was significantly involved in the conception and realization of scientific conferences and major medieval exhibitions. These included "Otto the Great" (2001 in Magdeburg), "Emperor Henry II" (2002 in Bamberg), "Holy Roman Empire of the German Nation. From Otto the Great to the End of the Middle Ages" (2006 in Magdeburg), "Die Staufer und Italien" (2010/11 in Mannheim), "Die Wittelsbacher am Rhein. Die Kurpfalz und Europa" (2013/2014 in Mannheim) or "The Popes and the Unity of the Latin World" (2017 in Mannheim).

In preparation for a major exhibition, a scientific conference was held, the results of which were documented in an accompanying publication. For the scientific preparation of the 27th exhibition of the Council of Europe and the state of Saxony-Anhalt ("Otto the Great, Magdeburg and Europe") a colloquium was held in Magdeburg in May 1999 under the central theme "Ottonian New Beginnings". The contributions were published by Weinfurter and Schneidmüller in 2001. According to the preface of the editors, the transformation process of the 10th century between change and continuity from (East) Frankish to German history was the subject of debate. The focus was on Otto the Great. Weinfurter introduced the conference volume with his contribution. He emphasized the indivisibility of rule, the sacralization of kingship, and the recourse to the imperial idea as formative moments of Otto's rule. In 2001, together with Bernd Schneidmüller and Matthias Puhle, he published two weighty volumes on the Magdeburg exhibition "Otto the Great, Magdeburg and Europe," which together comprise more than 1200 pages. The first volume contains 37 essays in six chapters. In the second volume, well over 50 scholars present and evaluate the exhibits. To mark the thousand years of Henry II's reign, the Bavarian State Exhibition was held in Bamberg from July 9 to October 20, 2002. Weinfurter, along with Josef Kirmeier and Bernd Schneidmüller, was one of the editors of the volume accompanying the exhibition.

Weinfurter edited an anthology on Saladin and the Crusaders with Heinz Gaube and again Schneidmüller in 2005. The volume bundles the results of a Mannheim conference on the preparation of the Saladin exhibition, organized by the Reiss-Engelhorn-Museen in Mannheim in partnership with the State Museum for Nature and Man in Oldenburg and the Halle State Museum of Prehistory. At the Kulturhistorisches Museum Magdeburg, an international conference in 2004 dealt with the 29th exhibition of the Council of Europe and State Exhibition Saxony-Anhalt "Heiliges Römisches Reich Deutscher Nation 962 bis 1806. Von Otto dem Großen bis zum Ausgang des Mittelalters" planned for autumn 2006. Schneidmüller and Weinfurter published the contributions in 2006. In doing so, the editors wanted to turn away from a traditional chronological structure according to dynasties by attempting to combine classical political history with approaches based on the history of mentalities and perceptions. Weinfurter, along with Bernd Schneidmüller and Alfried Wieczorek, edited the proceedings of an international conference held at the Reiss-Engelhorn Museums in Mannheim in the fall of 2008. The conference was "concerned with the interaction between imperial ruler authority of the Hohenstaufen on the one hand and the 'configurations of order' and the formative power of certain regions in the Hohenstaufen empire on the other." Weinfurter's work is also a part of the book.

In May 2010, in the run-up to the Magdeburg exhibition Otto der Große und das Römische Reich. Kaisertum von der Antike zum Mittelalter. Weinfurter published the contributions with Hartmut Leppin and Bernd Schneidmüller in 2012. Roman emperorship in the first millennium is the focus of the volume. Two comprehensive volumes edited by Weinfurter, Bernd Schneidmüller, and Alfried Wieczorek were published to accompany the exhibition "The Hohenstaufen and Italy" at the Reiss-Engelhorn Museums in Mannheim, which ran from September 19, 2010, to February 20, 2011. The first volume bundles 43 scholarly "essays" and the second volume contains the exhibits. With the Upper Rhine region, Upper Italy with its urban communities, and the Kingdom of Sicily, three regions of innovation were the focus of interest. In particular, transfer processes and cultural developments are given special attention. Weinfurter dealt in summary with "Competing concepts of rule and ideas of order in the Hohenstaufen empires north and south of the Alps."

In preparation for the exhibition of the Reiss-Engelhorn Museums in Mannheim on the theme "The Wittelsbachers on the Rhine. The Electoral Palatinate and Europe" (2013/2014), a scientific conference was held in January 2012. The occasion was the 800th anniversary of the award of the Palatinate County on the Rhine by the Staufer Frederick II to Duke Ludwig I of Bavaria. The contributions deal with the scope of action of the Wittelsbach dynasty and their rule in the Palatinate and cover the period from 1200 to the end of the War of the Succession of Landshut in 1504/05. Together with Schneidmüller, Jörg Peltzer and Alfried Wieczorek, Weinfurter published the twenty contributions of the Mannheim conference in the anthology Die Wittelsbacher und die Kurpfalz im Mittelalter. Eine Erfolgsgeschichte? 2013. Weinfurter himself wrote a contribution on the Hohenstaufen foundations of the Palatinate County of the Rhine. In doing so, he addressed the continuities from Lorraine to Palatine rule and traced the successful expansion under Conrad von Staufen since 1156. According to Weinfurter, Heidelberg was already a central place of Palatine rule in the middle of the 12th century and not only after the death of Konrad von Staufen (1195). On the occasion of the upcoming exhibition "The Popes and the Unity of the Latin World," a conference was held in April 2016 at the Reiss-Engelhorn Museums in Mannheim. Weinfurter edited the anthology together with Volker Leppin, Christoph Strohm, Hubert Wolf, and Alfried Wieczorek in 2017. Weinfurter had spent five years preparing the exhibition "The Popes and the Unity of the Latin World." It presented valuable objects from 1500 years of papal history.

For the European Foundation Imperial Cathedral of Speyer, Weinfurter co-chaired the fourth scientific symposium on "King Rudolf I and the Rise of the House of Habsburg in the Middle Ages" with Schneidmüller in April 2018. Weinfurter's last project before his death was the work on the large state exhibition of the Rhineland-Palatinate General Directorate for Cultural Heritage "The Emperors and the Pillars of their Power. From Charlemagne to Frederick Barbarossa," which opened in September 2020.

In television or radio broadcasts, he tried to bring the Middle Ages closer to a wider audience. For ZDF, Weinfurter worked on the historical documentary series "Die Deutschen" (The Germans) as an expert scientific advisor and also appeared as an expert in the documentary for the three medieval episodes (Otto the Great; Henry IV, Barbarossa and Henry the Lion). The documentary series became one of ZDF's most successful productions in this segment, with a twenty percent market share and six million viewers during its initial broadcast. He read his book Canossa – Die Entzauberung der Welt himself as an audiobook.

== Memberships ==
Weinfurter became a member of the Constance Study Group for Medieval History in April 1998 and was its chairman from 2001 to 2007. When he took over as chairman, the financial support from state funds and thus the existence of the working group was acutely endangered. Weinfurter succeeded with his professional expertise and his power of persuasion to get the support of the ministry again and thus to secure the continuity of the working group. With the exception of Traute Endemann, the working group consisted only of men. As chairman, he ensured a significant rejuvenation of the membership and opened the working group to female scholars as well. Ten new members with an average age of 45, including three female professors for the first time, were admitted to the working group. In 2001, as chairman, he published an anthology on the occasion of the fiftieth anniversary of the Constance Working Group. He also examined the Constance Working Group in the mirror of its meetings in an essay in 2005. In doing so, he relied not on his own recollections, but primarily on the minutes of the Arbeitskreis. In his remarks, he paid particular tribute to František Graus, who had developed important insights and new approaches in the Constance Working Group in the last third of the 20th century but was regarded as a scholarly outsider in the Working Group itself.

Weinfurter became a member of the Society for Rhenish Historical Studies (1982), the Society for Franconian History (1986), the Historical Commission for Nassau (1991), the Sudeten German Academy of Sciences and Arts (1992), a member of the Commission for Historical Regional Studies in Baden-Württemberg (2000, on the board since 2006), a full member of the Heidelberg Academy of Sciences (2003), and a corresponding member of the philosophical-historical class abroad of the Austrian Academy of Sciences (2015). From 1999 to 2008 he was a reviewer for medieval history at the German Research Foundation, and from 2000 to 2004 he was vice-chairman of the Association of Historians of Germany. In addition, Weinfurter was a member of the Scientific Advisory Board of the German Historical Institute in Rome (2003–2011) and its chairman from 2008 to 2011.

== Scientific aftermath ==
According to Jörg Peltzer, the assertion of the papal claim to represent Christ alone on earth, the resulting changes in the sacral character of the emperorship, and the strengthening of princely self-understanding as bearers of the empire are three developments of long-term significance shaped by Weinfurter.

The term "configurations of order", which describes the interplay of lived and imagined order, was deliberately kept open and subsequently filled differently by researchers. Probably for this reason, the term has not yet gained acceptance in the field.

Today's image in historiography of the East Frankish-German ruler Henry II is determined by Weinfurter's biography published in 1999 and his accompanying studies.

== Selected publications ==
Fundamental essays by Stefan Weinfurter are summarized in the anthology: Gelebte Ordnung - gedachte Ordnung. Selected Contributions on King, Church and Empire. On the occasion of his 60th birthday. Edited by Helmuth Kluger, Hubertus Seibert and Werner Bomm. Thorbecke, Ostfildern 2005, ISBN 3-7995-7082-9

Monographs

- Salzburger Bistumsreform und Bischofspolitik im 12. Jahrhundert. Der Erzbischof Konrad I. von Salzburg (1106–1147) und die Regularkanoniker (= Kölner Historische Abhandlungen. Bd. 24). Böhlau, Köln u. a. 1975, ISBN 3-412-00275-5 (Zugleich: Köln, Universität, Dissertation, 1973).
- Herrschaft und Reich der Salier. Grundlinien einer Umbruchzeit. Thorbecke, Sigmaringen 1991, ISBN 978-3-7995-4131-2 (3. Auflage. ebenda 1992; in englischer Sprache: The Salian century. Main currents in an age of transition. Translated by Barbara M. Bowlus. Foreword by Charles R. Bowlus. University of Pennsylvania Press, Philadelphia PA 1999, ISBN 0-8122-3508-8).
- Heinrich II. (1002–1024). Herrscher am Ende der Zeiten. Pustet, Regensburg 1999, ISBN 3-7917-1654-9 (3., verbesserte Auflage. ebenda 2002).
- Das Jahrhundert der Salier (1024–1125). Thorbecke, Ostfildern 2004, ISBN 3-7995-0140-1 (Unveränderter Nachdruck. ebenda 2008, ISBN 978-3-7995-4105-3).
- Canossa. Die Entzauberung der Welt. Beck, München 2006, ISBN 3-406-53590-9
- Das Reich im Mittelalter. Kleine deutsche Geschichte von 500 bis 1500. Beck, München 2008, ISBN 978-3-406-56900-5 (4., aktualisierte Auflage. ebenda 2021).
- Karl der Große. Der heilige Barbar. Piper, München 2013, ISBN 3-492-05582-6

Editions

- Consuetudines canonicorum regularium Springirsbacenses-Rodenses (= Corpus Christianorum. Continuatio Mediaevalis. Bd. 48). Brepols, Turnhout 1978 (Text lateinisch, Vorwort und Einleitung deutsch).
- Die Geschichte der Eichstätter Bischöfe des Anonymus Haserensis. Edition – Übersetzung – Kommentar (= Eichstätter Studien. NF Bd. 24). Pustet, Regensburg 1987, ISBN 3-7917-1134-2

Editorial

- with Hanna Vollrath: Köln – Stadt und Bistum in Kirche und Reich des Mittelalters. Festschrift für Odilo Engels zum 65. Geburtstag (= Kölner historische Abhandlungen. Bd. 39). Böhlau, Köln u. a. 1993, ISBN 3-412-12492-3
- with Bernd Schneidmüller: Otto III. – Heinrich II. Eine Wende? (= Mittelalter-Forschungen. Bd. 1). Thorbecke, Sigmaringen 1997, ISBN 3-7995-4251-5 (Digitalisat).
- with Bernd Schneidmüller: Ottonische Neuanfänge. Symposion zur Ausstellung „Otto der Große, Magdeburg und Europa". von Zabern, Mainz 2001, ISBN 3-8053-2701-3
- with Bernd Schneidmüller: Die deutschen Herrscher des Mittelalters. Historische Portraits von Heinrich I. bis Maximilian I. (919–1519). Beck, München 2003, ISBN 3-406-50958-4
- with Marion Steinicke: Investitur- und Krönungsrituale. Herrschaftseinsetzungen im kulturellen Vergleich. Böhlau, Köln u. a. 2005, ISBN 978-3-412-09604-5
- with Bernd Schneidmüller: Heilig – römisch – deutsch. Das Reich im mittelalterlichen Europa. Sandstein, Dresden 2006, ISBN 3-937602-56-9
- with Bernd Schneidmüller: Ordnungskonfigurationen im hohen Mittelalter (= Vorträge und Forschungen. Bd. 64). Thorbecke, Ostfildern 2006, ISBN 978-3-7995-6864-7 (online).
- with Bernd Schneidmüller: Salisches Kaisertum und neues Europa. Die Zeit Heinrichs IV. und Heinrichs V. Wissenschaftliche Buchgesellschaft, Darmstadt 2007, ISBN 978-3-534-20871-5
- Päpstliche Herrschaft im Mittelalter. Funktionsweisen, Strategien, Darstellungsformen (= Mittelalter-Forschungen. Bd. 38). Thorbecke, Ostfildern 2012, ISBN 978-3-7995-4289-0 (Digitalisat).
- with Jörg Peltzer, Bernd Schneidmüller, Alfried Wieczorek (Hrsg.): Die Wittelsbacher und die Kurpfalz im Mittelalter. Eine Erfolgsgeschichte? Schnell + Steiner, Regensburg 2013, ISBN 978-3-7954-2645-3
- with Julia Becker, Tino Licht: Karolingische Klöster. Wissenstransfer und kulturelle Innovation (= Materiale Textkulturen. Bd. 4). De Gruyter, Berlin u. a. 2015, ISBN 978-3-11-037123-9

== Bibliography ==
- Antrittsrede von Herrn Stefan Weinfurter an der Heidelberger Akademie der Wissenschaften vom 31. Januar 2004. In: Jahrbuch der Heidelberger Akademie der Wissenschaften für 2004, Heidelberg 2005, pp. 119–121.
- Michael Bonewitz: Die Funde in der Johanniskirche halte ich für eine Sensation. Interview mit Stefan Weinfurter. In: Mainz. Vierteljahreshefte für Kultur, Politik, Wirtschaft. 34, 2014, Heft 4, pp. 10–23.
- Jürgen Dendorfer: Stefan Weinfürter (1945–2018). In: Zeitschrift für die Geschichte des Oberrheins. 167, 2019, pp. 425–432.
- Johannes Fried: Der Historiker Stefan Weinfurter ist tot. In: Süddeutsche Zeitung, 3. September 2018, p. 10.
- Klaus-Frédéric Johannes: Zum Tode Stefan Weinfurters (24.6.1945 – 27.8.2018). In: Archiv für Mittelrheinische Kirchengeschichte 70, 2018, pp. 471–473.
- Oliver Jungen: Der Heinrich. Zum Sechzigsten des Mediävisten Stefan Weinfurter. In: Frankfurter Allgemeine Zeitung, 24. Juni 2005, Nr. 144, p. 39.
- Gert Melville: Prolog. In: Hubertus Seibert, Werner Bomm, Verena Türck (Hrsg.): Autorität und Akzeptanz. Das Reich im Europa des 13. Jahrhunderts. Thorbecke, Ostfildern 2013, ISBN 978-3-7995-0516-1, pp. 11–15.
- Jörg Peltzer: Stefan Weinfurter (1945–2018). In: Historische Zeitschrift. 308, 2019, pp. 711–720.
- Lieselotte E. Saurma: Antrittsvorlesung Prof. Dr. Stefan Weinfurter. 21. Juni 2000. In: Stefan Weinfurter (Hrsg.): Neue Wege der Forschung. Antrittsvorlesungen am Historischen Seminar Heidelberg 2000–2006. (= Heidelberger Historische Beiträge. Bd. 3). Winter, Heidelberg 2009, ISBN 978-3-8253-5634-7, pp. 11–14.
- Viola Skiba: In Memoriam Prof. Dr. Stefan Weinfurter: 24. Juni 1945 – 27. August 2018. In: Mannheimer Geschichtsblätter 36, 2018, pp. 58–59.
- Bernd Schneidmüller: Bindende Wirkung. Zum Tod des Mittelalterhistorikers Stefan Weinfurter. In: Frankfurter Allgemeine Zeitung, 30. August 2018, Nr. 201, p. 11 (online).
- Bernd Schneidmüller: Stefan Weinfurter (24.6.1945 – 27.8.2018). In: Jahrbuch der Heidelberger Akademie der Wissenschaften für 2018. Heidelberg 2019, pp. 199–202 (online).
- Stefan Weinfurter. In: Jörg Schwarz: Der Konstanzer Arbeitskreis für mittelalterliche Geschichte 1951–2001. Die Mitglieder und ihr Werk. Eine bio-bibliographische Dokumentation (= Veröffentlichungen des Konstanzer Arbeitskreises für Mittelalterliche Geschichte aus Anlass seines fünfzigjährigen Bestehens 1951–2001. Bd. 2). Herausgegeben von Jürgen Petersohn. Thorbecke, Stuttgart 2001, ISBN 3-7995-6906-5, pp. 425–431 (online).
- Herwig Wolfram: Stefan Weinfurter. In: Österreichische Akademie der Wissenschaften. Almanach 2015, 165. Jahrgang, Wien 2016, p. 192.
- Herwig Wolfram: Stefan Weinfurter. In: Österreichische Akademie der Wissenschaften. Almanach 2018, 168. Jahrgang, Wien 2019, p. 396–399.
- Wer ist wer? Das deutsche Who's Who. L. Ausgabe 2011/2012, p. 1247.
