= August Nitschke =

German historian (1926–2019)

August Nitschke (September 18, 1926 – September 2, 2019) was a German historian and co-founder of the Historical anthropology movement.

== Life ==
August Nitschke was the eldest son of the pediatrician Halle Alfred Nitschke (1898–1960) and the physician Maria Nitschke (1897–1991).

He grew up in Hamburg, Berlin, and Halle an der Saale. After his military service, he studied in Göttingen. There, he was awarded a doctorate in 1951. From 1950 to 1952 he worked as a tutor and assistant at the Leibniz College. Soon after, he received a grant from the German Research Foundation which enabled him to work for three years in Rome, where he edited the medieval chronicle at Saba Malaspina.

He was the first historian to go to the then TH Stuttgart after the war. There he published the "Propyläen Weltgeschichte"[de], an anthropological treatise, with Golo Mann.

He taught at the Historical Institute of the University of Stuttgart, which he co-founded in 1960. The establishment of the “History” and “History of Science and Technology” courses can be traced back to his work. In 1968/69 he was Dean of the then "Faculty for natural sciences and humanities", in 1970/71 and 1978/79 he served as vice-rector and temporarily took over the office of rector. In these functions and as a long-term member of the Senate, he strongly advocated the expansion of the Technical University of Stuttgart into a full university. For the SDR he designed the series Funkkolleg Geschichte (1979) and Funkkolleg Jahrhundertwende (1988). In 1987 he worked as a visiting scholar at the Wissenschaftskolleg zu Berlin, 1991/92 at the Center for Interdisciplinary Research at Bielefeld University and followed invitations to the US, Japan and China.

August Nitschke was awarded the Federal Cross of Merit on October 17, 1986, for his services to historical research at home and abroad, especially for the organization of the International Congress of Historians in Stuttgart together with Eberhard Jäckel in 1980. Nitschke's students and employees included Dieter R. Bauer, Johannes Burkhardt, Henning Eichberg, Ekkehard Eickhoff, Andreas Kalckhoff, Sönke Lorenz, Harald Kleinschmidt, Tilman Struve, Wolfgang Stürner and Johannes Zahlten. After his retirement on September 30, 1994, he continued to work in various academic and journalistic fields, including the Northeastern University in Shenyang.

== Research ==
=== Dialogue with the natural sciences ===
Nitschke's early works were from the era of the investiture controversy, Staufer Sicily, and source studies of the 13th century. Together with Golo Mann, he published the "Propylaea World History" from 1960 to 1964. Working at a university with a focus on engineering led him to ask about the historical conditions of scientific knowledge and technical action. For decades he has successfully sought dialogue with the natural and engineering sciences. This resulted in cooperation in the form of joint courses, conferences and publications. With two radio colleges on the methodology of historical research and on the culture of the turn of the century (1900) Nitschke reached a broad public.

=== Historical behavior research ===
His efforts to achieve methodical communication with the natural sciences led him to "historical behavior research", which later led to "historical anthropology". In doing so, he focused on the historical change in physical and space-oriented behavior as a mirror of social and political change. The observation and description of human behavior beyond intentions, justifications and so-called worldviews should make historical processes measurable in a certain way. As fields of observation he mainly used art, dance, sports, games, descriptions of nature and fairy tales. Pioneering works in this direction are:

- “Knowledge of nature and political action in the Middle Ages. Body, Movement, Space ”(1967)
- “ Art and Behavior. Analogue configurations ”(1975)
- “ Historical behavior research. Analyzes of social behavior ”(1981)
- “ Questions in historical anthropology ”(1984)
- “ Bodies in motion. Gestures, dances and spaces in the course of history ”(1989).

=== History of mentality with an interdisciplinary approach ===
Part of this approach to natural science was that on the one hand he made the methods of biological behavior research fruitful for the science of history and, on the other hand, wanted it to benefit from the insights of ethnology. In the ways of life and ways of thinking of indigenous peoples, he recognized an approach particularly to the older epochs of European history. In it he met with similar efforts of the French mentality research (mentality history) for the magazine "Annales". Like his colleagues, the study of non-European history and intercultural comparison has always been a strong research concern for him.
