= Mayke de Jong =

Dutch historian (born 1950)

Mayke de Jong (13 October 1950, Amsterdam) is a Dutch historian and Professor Emerita of Medieval History at Utrecht University. Her research focuses on the political and religious history of the early Middle Ages.

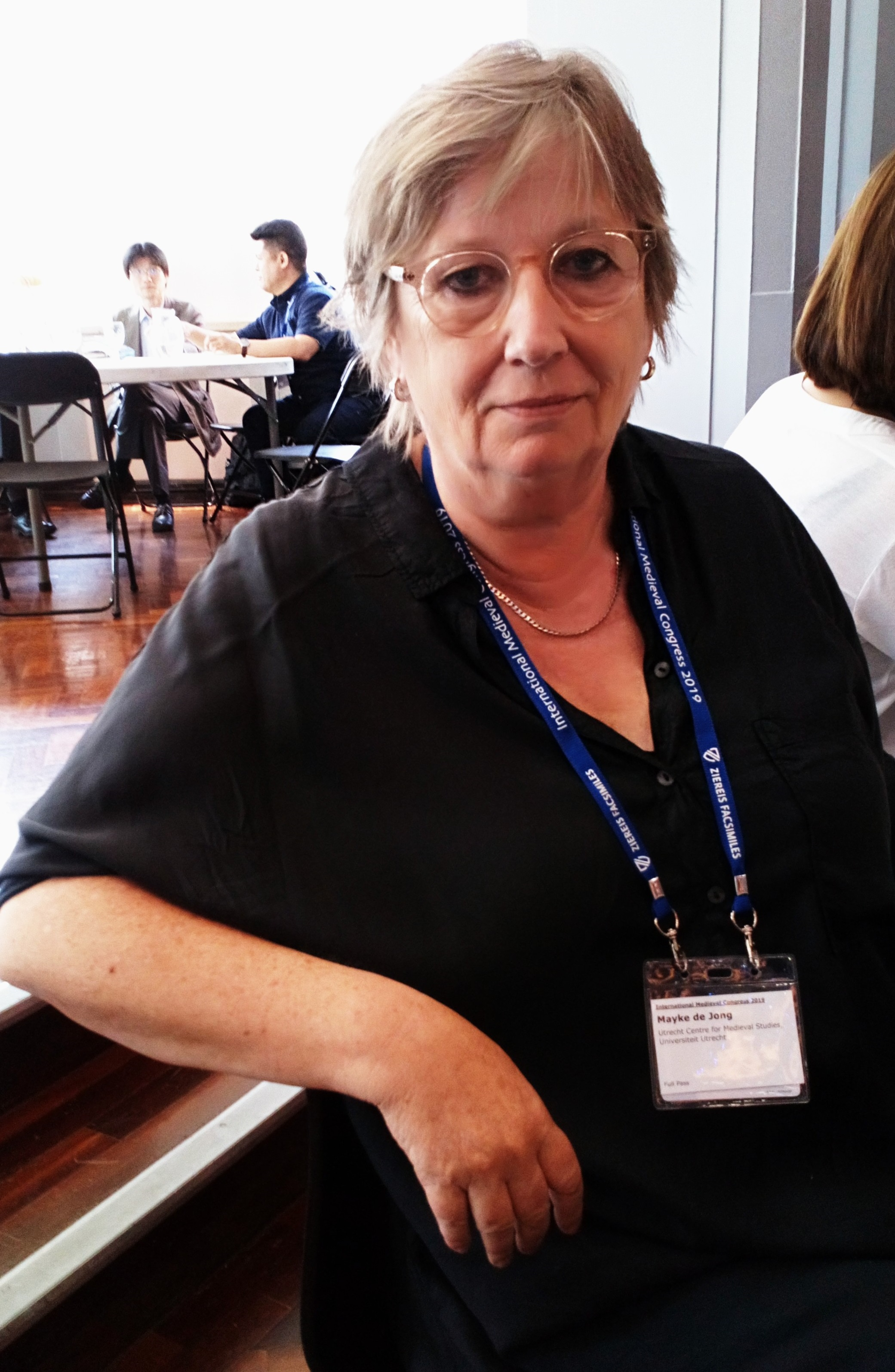
Professor Mayke de Jong

== Career ==
De Jong received her MA degree from the University of Amsterdam in 1977. She achieved her PhD with honours (cum laude) at the same university in 1986 with a thesis entitled Kind en klooster in de vroege middeleeuwen (Child and monastery in the early Middle Ages.)

During this time, she worked as a lecturer in Medieval History at the Catholic University of Nijmegen and as a lecturer in Medieval History and Cultural Anthropology at the School for Arts and Literature in The Hague.

She was appointed Professor in Medieval History at Utrecht University in 1987, one year after receiving her doctorate. She continued in this role until her retirement in 2016. In this time she was also a visiting fellow at Trinity College, Cambridge, and at the Princeton Institute for Advanced Study.

She has served as Principal investigator for national and international research projects including Texts and Identities in the Early Middle Ages, Cultural Memory, and the Resources of the Past, 400-1000 and Charlemagne’s Backyard? Rural society in the Netherlands in the Carolingian Age. An archaeological perspective.

Upon her retirement, De Jong became Professor Emerita of Medieval History at Utrecht University.

== Honours and awards ==
In 1985, 1993 and 2005 De Jong was a fellow at the Netherlands Institute for Advanced Study.

In 1999 she became a Corresponding member of the Royal Historical Society.

In 2015 she was invited to give the third annual Early Medieval Europe lecture at the International Medieval Congress in Leeds.

In 2015 she received the Humboldt Prize and spent a corresponding semester at the Friedrich Meinecke Institut of the Free University of Berlin.

In 2016 a Festschrift was published in honour of de Jong: Religious Franks: Religion and Power in the Frankish Kingdoms: Studies in Honour of Mayke de Jong.

In 2022 De Jong became a Corresponding Fellow of the British Academy.

== Selected publications ==
- Confronting Crisis in the Carolingian Empire. Paschasius Radbertus' Funeral Oration for Wala of Corbie. Translated and annotated by Mayke de Jong and Justin Lake (Manchester: Manchester University Press, 2020). ISBN 978-1-5261-3484-4.
- Epitaph for an Era: Politics and Rhetoric in the Carolingian World (Cambridge: Cambridge University Press, 2019; paperback edition, 2020). ISBN 978-1-108-81388-4.
- The Penitential State. Authority and Atonement in the Age of Louis the Pious, 814–840. Cambridge University Press, Cambridge 2009, ISBN 978-0-521-88152-4.
- Het vreemde verleden: over vroege middeleeuwen, religie, en hedendaagse vragen (Utrecht : Universiteit Utrecht, Faculteit Geesteswetenschappen, Letteren, 2006)
- Topographies of Power in the Early Middle Ages, edited by Mayke de Jong, Frans Theuws and Carine van Rhijn, Transformation of the Roman World, 6 (Leiden: Brill, 2001)
- Medieval Transformations: Texts, Power and Gifts in Context, edited by Mayke de Jong and Esther Cohen (Leiden: Brill, 2001)
- Rondom Gregorius van Tours, edited by Mayke de Jong, Els Rose, Festschrift for Giselle de Nie (Utrecht: Vakgroep Geschiedenis der Universiteit Utrecht, 2001)
- In Samuel's image. Child oblation in the early medieval West (= Brill's studies in intellectual history. Bd. 12). Brill, Leiden u. a. 1996, ISBN 90-04-10483-6.
- "Sacrum palatium et ecclesia. L'autorité religieuse royale sous les Carolingiens (790-840)" in Annales. Histoires, sciences sociales, no. 6, 2003, pp. 1243-1269.
