= Hedwig Röckelein =

German professor of medieval history

Hedwig Röckelein (born 13 July 1956) is professor of medieval history at the University of Göttingen, Germany.

== Early life ==
Hedwig Röckelein was born in Burgebrach on 13 July 1956. From 1975 to 1981, she studied German, history, politics and prehistoric and early historical archeology at the Universities of Würzburg and Freiburg. In 1985, she received her PhD at the University of Freiburg with a dissertation on high medieval Latin texts.

== Career ==
From 1985 to 1989 she created as part of the DFG program Erfassung der Handschriftenbestände in der Bundesrepublik Deutschland "capture the manuscript holdings in the Federal Republic of Germany" a catalog of Latin manuscripts at the library of the University of Tübingen. From 1990 to 1998 she was assistant lecturer at the University of Hamburg. Since 1999 she is a professor of Medieval history at the University of Göttingen. In January 2008 she became a full member of the Academy of Sciences in Göttingen.

Her research interests include women's and gender history of the Middle Ages, the media and communication in the Middle Ages and the Medieval vision literature.

== Selected publications ==
Monographs

- Reliquientranslationen nach Sachsen im 9. Jahrhundert. Über Kommunikation, Mobilität und Öffentlichkeit im Frühmittelalter (= Francia. Beihefte der Francia. vol. 48). Thorbecke, Stuttgart 2002, ISBN 3-7995-7442-5 (also: University of Hambug, habilitation thesis, 1997/1998), Digitalisat (PDF; 19,28 MB).
- Otloh, Gottschalk, Tnugdal. Individuelle und kollektive Visionsmuster des Hochmittelalters (= Europäische Hochschulschriften. Series 3: Geschichte und ihre Hilfswissenschaften. vol. 319). Lang, Frankfurt am Main et al. 1987, ISBN 3-8204-9512-6 (also: University of Freiburg, dissertation, 1985: Otloh, Mönch von S. Emmeram, Gottschalk, der Bauer aus Holstein, und Tnugdal, der irische Ritter.).

Books

- with Hans-Werner Goetz: Frauen-Beziehungsgeflechte im Mittelalter (= Das Mittelalter. vol. 1, issue 2, ISSN 0949-0345). Akademie-Verlag, Berlin 1996.
- with Charlotte Schoell-Glass und Maria E. Müller: Jeanne d'Arc oder wie Geschichte eine Figur konstruiert (= Frauen – Kultur – Geschichte. vol. 4). Herder, Freiburg (Breisgau) et al. 1996, ISBN 3-451-23953-1.
- Biographie als Geschichte (= Forum Psychohistorie. vol. 1). Diskord, Tübingen 1993, ISBN 3-89295-571-9.
- with Claudia Opitz und Dieter R. Bauer: Maria, Abbild oder Vorbild? Zur Sozialgeschichte mittelalterlicher Marienverehrung. Diskord, Tübingen 1990, ISBN 3-89295-539-5.
