= Transformation of the Roman World =

Transformation of the Roman World was a 5-year scientific programme, during the years 1992 to 1997, founded via the European Science Foundation. The research project was to investigate the societal transformation taking place in Europe in the period between Late Antiquity up to the time of the Carolingian dynasty. The results were presented in museum exhibitions and also published in a book series with the same title as the project. Contributors to the series include Walter Pohl, Richard Hodges, Bryan Ward-Perkins, Ian Wood, Mayke de Jong, Janet Nelson, Chris Wickham, Miquel Barceló, Hans-Werner Goetz, and Jörg Jarnut.

A paper with this title has since the 1970s been one of the options offered by the Faculty of History as part of the BA degree course at the University of Cambridge.

== The Brill's series "Transformation of the Roman World" ==
1. Walter Pohl, ed. (1997). Kingdoms of the Empire. The Integration of Barbarians in Late Antiquity. Brill. ISBN 9789004108455.
2. Walter Pohl; Helmut Reimitz, eds. (1998). Strategies of Distinction. The Construction of Ethnic Communities, 300-800. Brill. ISBN 9789004108462.
3. Richard Hodges; William Bowden, eds. (2003). The Sixth Century. Production, Distribution and Demand. Brill. ISBN 9789004109803.
4. G.P. Brogiolo; Bryan Ward-Perkins, eds. (2003). The Idea and Ideal of the Town between Late Antiquity and the Early Middle Ages. Brill. ISBN 9789004109018.
5. Evangelos Chrysos; Ian Wood, eds. (1999). East and West : modes of communication : proceedings of the first plenary conference at Merida. Brill. ISBN 9789004109292.
6. Mayke de Jong; Frans Theuws; Carine van Rhijn, eds. (2001). Topographies of Power in the Early Middle Ages. Brill. ISBN 9789004117341.
7. Missing
8. Frans Theuws; Janet Nelson, eds. (2003). Rituals of Power. Brill. ISBN 978-90-04-10902-5.
9. G.P. Brogiolo; N. Gauthier; N. Christie, eds. (2003). Towns and their Territories Between Late Antiquity and the Early Middle Ages. Brill. ISBN 9789004118690.
10. Walter Pohl; Ian Wood; Helmut Reimitz, eds. (2000). The Transformation of Frontiers. From Late Antiquity to the Carolingians. Brill. ISBN 9789004111158.
11. Inge Lyse Hansen; Chris Wickham, eds. (2000). The Long Eighth Century. Production, Distribution and Demand. Brill. ISBN 9789004117235.
12. Richard Corradini; Max Diesenberger; Helmut Reimitz, eds. (2002). The Construction of Communities in the Early Middle Ages. Texts, Resources and Artefacts. Brill. ISBN 9789004118621.
13. Hans-Werner Goetz; Jörg Jarnut; Walter Pohl; Sören Kaschke, eds. (2002). Regna and Gentes. The Relationship between Late Antique and Early Medieval Peoples and Kingdoms in the Transformation of the Roman World. Brill. ISBN 9789004125247.
14. Miquel Barceló; François Sigaut, eds. (2004). The Making of Feudal Agricultures?. Brill. ISBN 9789004117228.

== See also ==
- Ancient history
- Classical antiquity
- Late antiquity
- Early Middle Ages

== Literature ==
- Ian N. Wood (1997). "Report: The European Science Foundation's Programme on the Transformation of the Roman World and Emergence of Early Medieval Europe". Early Medieval Europe. 6 (2): 217–227. doi:10.1111/1468-0254.00013.
- Ian N. Wood (2016). "The Transformation of Late Antiquity 1971 - 2015". Networks and Neighbours – via academia.edu.
