= Kulturhistorisches Museum Magdeburg =

German museum

Coordinates: 52°07′32″N 11°37′48″E

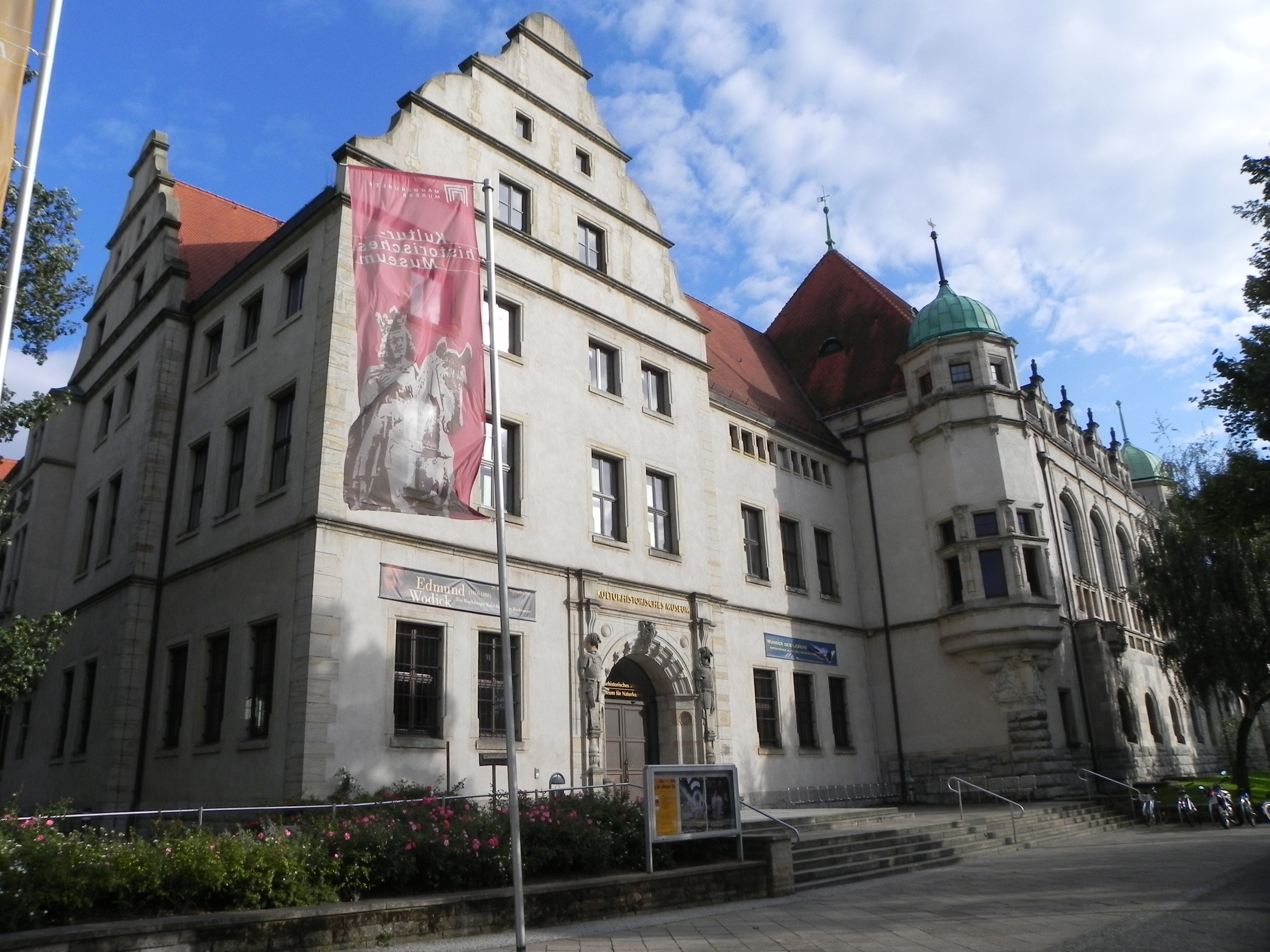
The Kulturhistorisches Museum in 2011

The Kulturhistorische Museum Magdeburg (KHM) is a museum in Magdeburg for cultural history. It was originally founded in 1906 as an art-historically oriented Kaiser-Friedrich Museum. The museum focuses on the history of the city in permanent and special exhibitions. Art-historical pieces are also presented. The Museum für Naturkunde Magdeburg is also located in the same building.

== History ==
After various predecessor institutions, the Magdeburg Museum of Cultural History was opened on 17 December 1906 as the Kaiser-Friedrich-Museum. The first director of the museum was the art historian Theodor Volbehr. After numerous private gifts and acquisitions from Europe, the National Socialists endeavoured to remove unwelcome objects from 1933 onwards. During the Second World War, the museum building was severely destroyed. In addition, an extensive part of the outsourced collections, including the famous painting by Vincent van Gogh The Painter on the Way to Tarascon, was lost. Subsequently, the building was largely rebuilt, extensively restored and the collections expanded. In addition, the Museum für Naturkunde Magdeburg moved into the building of the former Kaiser-Friedrich-Museum.

From the 1990s onwards, the highlights of the exhibitions in the Museum of Cultural History included the Council of Europe exhibitions Otto the Great – Magdeburg and Europe (2001) and Holy Roman Empire of the German Nation (2006). Other important recent exhibitions were Magdeburg 1200 – Medieval Metropolis, Prussian Fortress, State Capital (2005), Dawn of the Gothic (2009), Otto the Great and the Roman Empire. Kaisertum von der Antike zum Mittelalter (2012), Against Emperor and Pope – Magdeburg and the Reformation (2018), Reformstadt der Moderne – Magdeburg in den Zwanzigern (2019), Faszination Stadt – Die Urbanisierung Europas im Mittelalter und das Magdeburger Recht (2019).

== Buildings ==
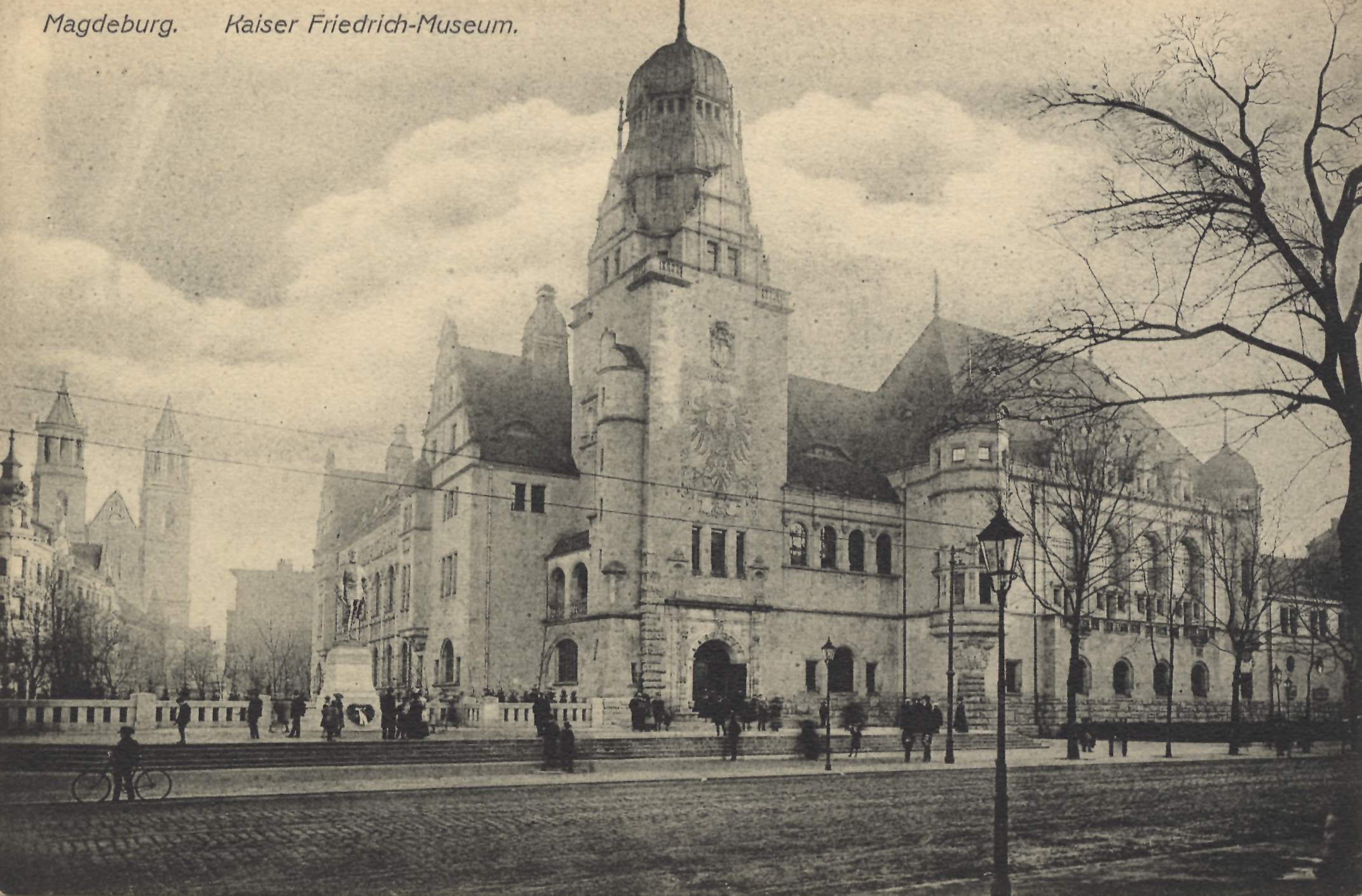
Building in its original state

The museum building is located at Otto-von-Guericke-Straße 68–73, only a few metres from Magdeburg Cathedral. It was built from 1901 to 1906 as a municipal museum for art and arts and crafts and was given the name Kaiser-Friedrich-Museum. The executed design had emerged indirectly from an architectural competition held in 1897 and came from the Viennese architects Friedrich Ohmann and August Kirstein. It was built in the agglomerated building type.

== Emperor Otto Hall ==
In addition to the period rooms, the building includes the Great Hall. This was created in the style of the buildings of the Germanisches Nationalmuseum in Nuremberg in the form of a church room with a crypt and was originally titled the Hall of Magdeburg Antiquities. After the destruction in the Second World War and the subsequent renovations, the character of the room was considerably changed by, among other things, inserting a false ceiling. It was only after the Peaceful Revolution and in the context of the first Otto der Grosse exhibition that extensive renovations could take place from 1997. In 2001, the room was reopened and renamed the Kaiser-Otto-Saal. Nowadays it is mainly used as a lecture, meeting and exhibition room.

Since the end of the 2010s, the original statue of the Magdeburger Reiter and a baroque Nativity scene have been on display in the Emperor Otto Hall. The three-part mural Scenes from the Life of Otto the Great by Arthur Kampf in 1905/06 illustrates the hall.

== Operation ==
The Museum of Cultural History employs 27 people. It is managed by Gabriele Köster. A special feature of the offer is the Magdeburger Reiter by Playmobil, with which the toy manufacturer recreated a work of art for the first time and thus also advertises a city.

Since 1995, the Megedeborch has been staged in the museum's inner courtyard from spring to autumn. The project is a historical play in which schoolchildren can experience medieval Magdeburg for themselves in a reconstructed setting. For this, they slip into the role of various professions, practise the trades and thus populate the city.

== Collections ==
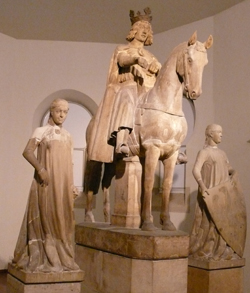
Original of the Magdeburger Reiter

- Archaeology: 400,000 finds from the Magdeburg region and northern Saxony-Anhalt as well as France, the Rhine-Moselle region, Hungary, Moravia and Italy from 200,000 years of human history, among others hand axe from Hundisburg (age: 200,000 years).
- Middle Ages: Objects from the Magdeburg region, among others pilgrimage signs with the Magdeburg Magi, Magdeburg juror's sayings, lion aquamanile.
- City history: 10,000 objects from Magdeburg that do not fit into one of the other exhibitions, among others. Rag doll, certificate of descent, Jewish star (Star of David), cup (German Theatre Exhibition 1927).
- Coins, medals: 11,000 coins, 2,400 medals, among others Otto-von-Guericke plaque, one and a quarter Schautaler (1692), bronze medal of the World Columbian Exposition in Chicago 1893, Moritzpfennig (2nd half 12th century), gold (numismatics) abschlag on the foundation of the city of Magdeburg (1599).
- Militaria: 1,400 objects, including halberd (2nd half of 16th century), hand grenade (17th century), heavy wall rifle (around 1600), fortress cannon (mid-17th century), balaclava (late 16th century).
- Furniture: 800 objects
- Paintings: 1,100 objects, including The Kyffhäuser, Withering, Magdeburg Cathedral with Ruins.
- Graphic arts: 4,500 hand drawings, 30,000 prints, 10,000 bookplates.
- Arts and crafts: 5,000 objects
- Textiles: 1,250 objects
- School history: mostly objects from the GDR schools, including Giant kaleidoscope (c. 1900), showcase Synthetic fuels, scroll painting (1930s).
- Library: 58,000 objects for scientific work and temporary exhibition. Otherwise only accessible with special permission; among others Der Stadt Magdeburg Gerichtsordnung (1625), pamphlet against the reintroduction of the Holy Mass by the Interim and against the Protestant theologian Agricola (1549), the second defence of the Magdeburg Council against the deposition and expulsion of Tilemann Heßhusen (1563).

== Exhibitions ==
=== Permanent exhibitions ===
- Magdeburg – Die Geschichte einer Stadt.
- Kunstverführung – Die historischen Kunstsammlungen.
- Der Magdeburger Reiter.
- Dauerausstellung Schulgeschichte.
- Fayence- und Steingutmanufaktur Guischard.
- Barockkrippe.

=== Special exhibitions ===
- 1992/1993: Wichmann von Seeburg (1152–1192)
- 1995: Dann färbte sich der Himmel blutrot… – Exhibition about the Destruction of Magdeburg on 16 January 1945
- 1996: Hanse – Städte – Bünde – Die sächsischen Städte zwischen Elbe und Weser um 1500
- 1998/1999: …gantz verheeret! – Magdeburg und der Dreißigjährige Krieg
- 2001: Otto der Große – Magdeburg und Europa (27. Ausstellung des Europarates and Landesausstellung Sachsen-Anhalt)
- 2002/2003: Otto von Guericke – Die Welt im leeren Raum
- 2003: Andreas Kuhnlein: Macht und Vergänglichkeit: Otto der Große und seine Zeit – Holzskulpturen
- 2003: Picasso Lebensfreude – Lithograph and Keramik
- 2003: Carl Hasenpflug (1802–1858) – Wahrheit und Vision
- 2003/2004: Friedensreich Hundertwasser-Architekturausstellung Gehasst – Gebaut – Geliebt
- 2004: Das germanische Fürstengrab von Gommern; Gold für die Ewigkeit
- 2005: Magdeburg 1200 – Mittelalterliche Metropole, Preußische Festung, Landeshauptstadt. Die Geschichte der Stadt von 805 bis 2005
- 2006: Ausstellung Heiliges Römisches Reich Deutscher Nation (29. Ausstellung des Europarates und Landesausstellung Sachsen-Anhalt zusammen mit dem Deutsches Historisches Museum Berlin)
- 2007: 30 Jahre Playmobil – Entdecke die Welt (travelling exhibition of the Historical Museum of the Palatinate)
- 2008: Unerwünscht. Verfolgt. Ermordet. Ausgrenzung und Terror während der nationalsozialistischen Diktatur in Magdeburg 1933–1945.
- 2009: Landesausstellung Sachsen-Anhalt: Aufbruch in die Gotik. The Magdeburg Cathedral and the late Hohenstaufen period.
- 2012: Otto der Große und das Römische Reich. Landesausstellung Sachsen-Anhalt
- 2015: Cracovia 3DKrakau – eine Stadt des Magdeburger Rechts
- 2018: Gegen Kaiser und Papst – Magdeburg und die Reformation
- 2019: Reformstadt der Moderne – Magdeburg in den Zwanzigern
- 2019: Faszination Stadt – Die Urbanisierung Europas im Mittelalter und das Magdeburger Recht.

== Publications ==
- Puhle, Matthias; Ausstellung Unerwünscht verfolgt – ermordet (2008). Unerwünscht, verfolgt, ermordet : Ausgrenzung und Terror während der nationalsozialistischen Diktatur in Magdeburg 1933–1945; [Begleitbuch zur Ausstellung Unerwünscht – verfolgt – ermordet, Kulturhistorisches Museum Magdeburg, 28. Januar bis 3. August 2008 (in German). Magdeburg. ISBN 978-3-930030-93-4. OCLC 254848440.
