= Johannes Burckhardt =

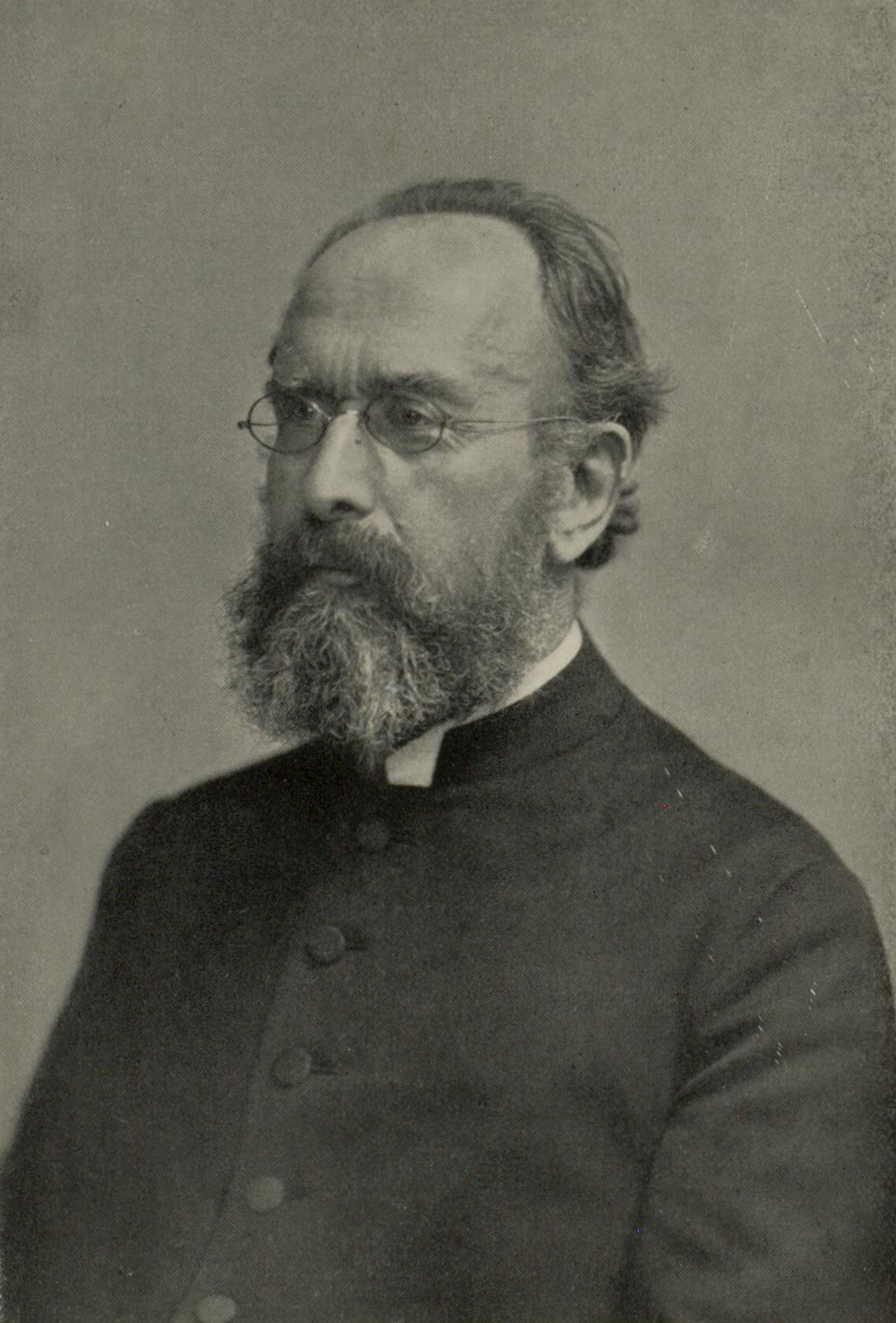
- Born: 20 October 1853; Altena, Westphalia
- Died: 27 January 1914 (aged 60); Nuremberg
- Occupation: Protestant minister

Johannes Burckhardt (20 October 1853 – 27 January 1914) was a German Protestant minister, who founded an organisation for female young Protestants, and for a mission at stations, Bahnhofsmission.

== Life and work ==
Born in Altena, Westphalia, Burckhardt was the son of the Protestant minister Eduard Burckhardt (died 1886) and a great-grandson of the writer Anna Schlatter-Bernet. He studied theology in Bonn and Tübingen. In 1880, he became Vereinsgeistlicher of the Inner mission in Bielefeld, where he collaborated closely with Friedrich von Bodelschwingh Sr. From 1889, he was a parish minister in Berlin.

Burckhardt founded in 1893 a national organisation for young female Protestants, the Vorständeverband der evangelischen Jungfrauenvereine Deutschlands, later called the Evangelischer Verband für die weibliche Jugend Deutschlands in Barmen. In 1894, he founded the first Protestant Bahnhofsmission in Germany, in Berlin.

In 1913/14, he built the Burckhardthaus in Dahlem. It housed the publishing house of the same name which published the magazine Deutsche Mädchen-Zeitung. Burkhard died in Dahlem.

== Publications ==
- Als die lebendigen Steine. Gedanken zur Gemeindearbeit in einer Großstadtgemeinde, M. Warneck, Berlin 1904.
- Die Gewinnung und Ausbildung von Berufsarbeiterinnen der Inneren Mission, Berlin 1903.
- Die Gewinnung weiblicher Kräfte für die Innere Mission, Hamburg 1905.
- "Gehe du auch hin in den Weinberg", in: Hennig, Martin (ed.): Wie der Meister uns in den Weinberg rief. Zeugnisse von Jesu Taten an seinen Jüngern gezeichnet von einer Reihe bekannter Vertreter der Inneren und Äußeren Mission, Hamburg 1906, pp 21–38.
- "Der Jungfrauenvereine Bedeutung und Aufgabe für das Reich Gottes", in: Der Kirche, für Volk und Vaterland, Berlin 1907.
- Fürsorge für die weibliche Jugend (magazine), 1892–1913.

== Literature ==
- Friedrich Wilhelm Bautz (1975). "Johannes Burckhardt". In Bautz, Friedrich Wilhelm (ed.). Biographisch-Bibliographisches Kirchenlexikon (BBKL) (in German). Vol. 1. Hamm: Bautz. col. 817. ISBN 3-88309-013-1.
- H. B. (Henny Burckhardt): Johannes Burckhardt. Ein Blick in sein Leben.. Wichern, Berlin-Dahlem [1922].
- Thomas Leiberg: Der St. Annen-Kirchhof in Berlin-Dahlem. Stapp, Berlin 1995, ISBN 3-87776-423-1, S. 91 f.
- Grete Schemann (1957). "Burckhardt, Johannes Friedrich Paul". Neue Deutsche Biographie (in German). Vol. 3. Berlin: Duncker & Humblot. p. 41. (full text online).
