= Steffen Patzold =

German historian

- Born: 1 September 1972 (age 54); Hanover, Germany

Academic background
- Education: University of Hamburg
- Academic advisor: Hans-Werner Goetz

Academic work
- Discipline: History
- Sub-discipline: Medievalism
- Institutions: University of Tübingen
- Main interests: The political and religious history of the Carolingian Empire

Steffen Patzold (born 1 September 1972) is a German historian. Patzold is Professor of Medieval History at the University of Tübingen and specializes in the political and religious history of the Carolingian Empire.

== Biography ==
Steffen Patzold was born in Hanover, Germany on 1 September 1972. Patzold studied history, art history and journalism at the University of Hamburg from 1991 to 1996, gaining his MA in history under the supervision of Hans-Werner Goetz. He gained his PhD in 1999. From 2000 to 2006, Patzold was the assistant of Goetz. He completed his habilitation at the University of Hamburg in 2006. Since 2007, Patzold has been Professor of Medieval History at the University of Tübingen.

Patzold specializes in the study of political and religious history of the Carolingian Empire. He is a Member of the Heidelberg Academy of Sciences and Humanities and co-editor of Germanische Altertumskunde Online.

== Selected works ==
- Konflikte im Kloster, 2000
- Episcopus, 2008
- Das Lehnswesen, 2012
- Ich und Karl der Große. Das Leben des Höflings Einhard, 2013
- Gefälschtes Recht aus dem Frühmittelalter, 2015
- Presbyter. Moral, Mobilität und die Kirchenorganisation im Karolingerreich, 2020
- (With Mischa Meier) Gene und Geschichte. Was die Archäogenetik zur Geschichtsforschung beitragen kann, 2021

== Sources ==
- "Prof. Dr. Steffen Patzold". University of Tübingen.
