= Hans-Werner Goetz =

German historian

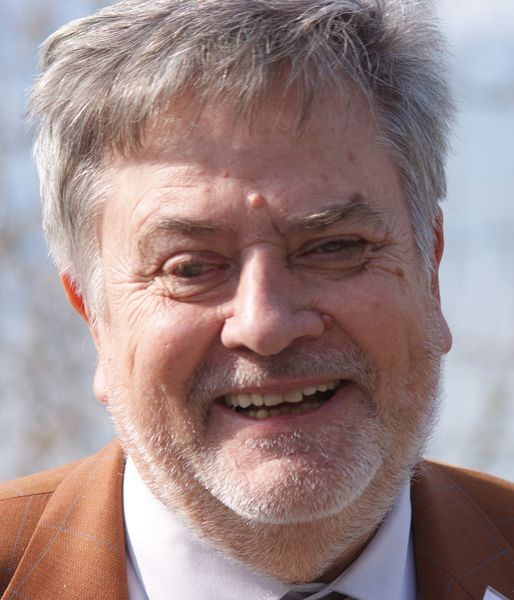
- Born: 16 July 1947 (age 79); Hanover, Germany

Academic background
- Education: Ruhr University Bochum

Academic work
- Discipline: History
- Sub-discipline: Medieval studies
- Institutions: University of Hamburg
- Notable students: Steffen Patzold
- Main interests: Ethnic, gender and class identity in the Middle Ages

Hans-Werner Goetz (born 16 July 1947) is a German historian who is Professor Emeritus of Medieval History at the University of Hamburg.

== Biography ==
Hans-Werner Goetz was born in Gelsenkirchen, Germany. From 1969 to 1974, Goetz studied history and English at the Ruhr University Bochum. He received his PhD at Bochum in 1976 under the supervision of Franz-Josef Schmale. From 1976 to 1986, Goetz was a research assistant at Bochum. He completed his habilitation in 1981 under the supervision of Otto of Freising. From 1990 to 2012, Goetz was a Professor of Medieval History at the University of Hamburg. Goetz has participated in many research projects sponsored by the European Research Council, including the Transformation of the Roman World project. His research centres on ethnic, gender and class identity in the Middle Ages. In 2013, Goetz became a member of Academia Europaea.

== Sources ==
- Steffen Patzold, Anja Rathmann-Lutz, Volker Scior (eds.): Geschichtsvorstellungen. Bilder, Texte und Begriffe aus dem Mittelalter. Festschrift für Hans-Werner Goetz zum 65. Geburtstag. Böhlau, Wien 2012, ISBN 978-3-412-20898-1.
- "Prof. (em.) Dr. Hans-Werner Goetz". University of Hamburg.
