= Human Rights Act =

Human Rights Act or Human Rights Code may refer to laws in different countries relating to human rights protections:

== Australia ==
- Human Rights Act 2004 (Australian Capital Territory)
- Charter of Human Rights and Responsibilities Act 2006 (Victoria)
- Human Rights Act 2019 (Queensland)

== Canada ==
- Alberta Human Rights Act
- Canadian Human Rights Act (federal)
- Charter of Human Rights and Freedoms (Quebec)
- Human Rights Act (New Brunswick)
- Human Rights Act, 2010 (Newfoundland and Labrador)
- Human Rights Act (Northwest Territories)
- Human Rights Act (Nova Scotia)
- Human Rights Act (Nunavut)
- Human Rights Act (Prince Edward Island)
- Human Rights Act (Yukon)
- Human Rights Code (British Columbia)
- Human Rights Code (Manitoba)
- Human Rights Code (Ontario)
- Saskatchewan Human Rights Code

== Ireland ==
- European Convention on Human Rights Act 2003

== New Zealand ==
- Human Rights Act 1993

== United Kingdom ==
- Human Rights Act 1998 (c. 42)
- Scottish Commission for Human Rights Act 2006 (asp 16), which established the Scottish Human Rights Commission

== See also ==
- Bill of rights
- Human rights
