= British Bill of Rights =

The British Bill of Rights can refer to:

- Bill of Rights 1689, an Act of the Parliament of England made following the Glorious Revolution; considered one of the fundamental parts of the Constitution of the United Kingdom
- Claim of Right Act 1689, an Act of the Parliament of Scotland that enacted the same principles as the Bill of Rights in England into Scottish law
- Proposed British Bill of Rights, a 2015 proposal to replace the Human Rights Act 1998 for the United Kingdom
- Bill of Rights Bill, a 2022 Bill that seeks to repeals and replaces the Human Rights Act 1998

== See also ==
- Bill of rights
