= German Historical Institute Paris =

Research institute in France

Coordinates: 48.8585°N 2.3633°E

German Historical Institute
- Established: November 21, 1958
- Director: Klaus Oschema
- Academic staff: 23
- Administrative staff: 18
- Location: Paris, France
- Website: www.dhi-paris.fr

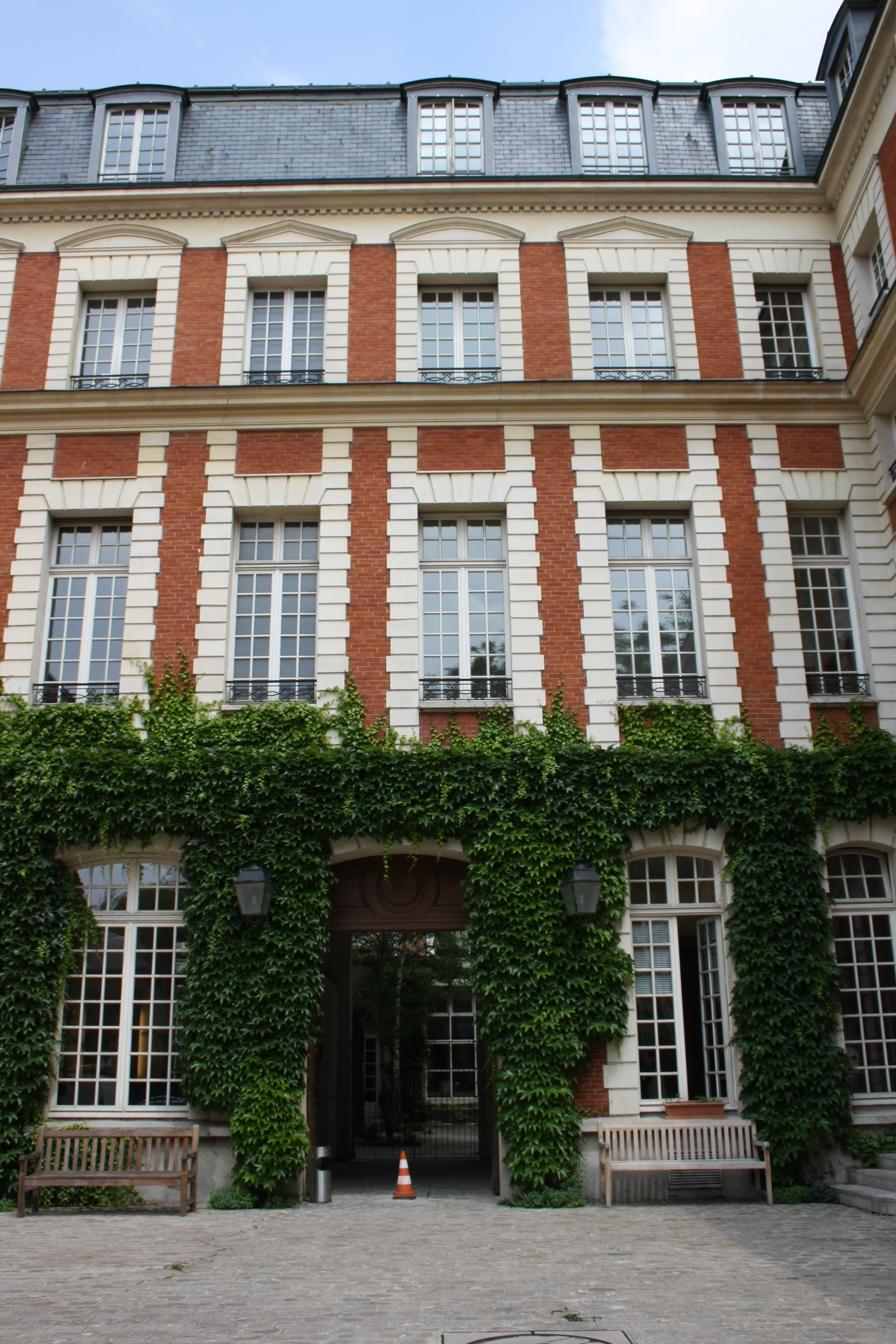
German Historical Institute Paris, Hôtel Duret-de-Chevry

The German Historical Institute Paris (GHIP) or Institut historique allemand (IHA) is an international research institute situated in Paris, France.

== Overview ==
As one of eleven research institutes in humanities worldwide funded by the German Federal Ministry of Education and Research (BMBF), the GHIP is part of the Max Weber Foundation – German Humanities Institutes Abroad, a legal entity closely linked to the German Federal Government and located in Bonn. The GHIP has the following main tasks: research, mediation, and qualification. The historical topics range from the Middle Ages to the 21st century. Besides France, Germany and Franco-German relations research projects focus on Western Europe, Africa and the digital humanities. Since 1994, the researchers of the GHIP have been working in the Hôtel Duret-de-Chevry, a hôtel particulier in the centrally located quarter Marais.

== History ==
The idea to found a German Historical Institute in Paris was already “an old favorite idea” of the medievalist and later president of the Monumenta Germaniae Historica Paul Fridolin Kehr, but the founding process stagnated early on in 1902/03. A new attempt was launched in 1941, again by a German medievalist, Theodor Mayer who wanted to underpin a “general German claim to leadership” in Europe. In the end, disputes about responsibilities delayed the project, which was eventually abandoned in the course of World War II.

It was no longer the will to dominate, but rather the striving for exchange and mediation among German and French historians that led to the founding of the “Deutsche Historische Forschungsstelle” (German Historical Research Center), which was inaugurated on 21 November 1958. It was financed with German federal government grants and worked under the umbrella organization “Wissenschaftliche Kommission zur Erforschung der deutsch-französischen Beziehungen” (Academic Commission on Franco-German Relations), based in Mainz. Its managing director, the medievalist Eugen Ewig, is regarded as the institute's founder. The academic intentions behind its foundation were tied to the process of Franco-German reconciliation after World War II. After many years of negotiations, one year after the signing of the Élysée Treaty, the German Historical Research Center in Paris was permanently institutionalized: on 1 July 1964, it was renamed “German Historical Institute Paris” and turned into a dependent institution under the responsibility of the Federal Minister for Scientific Research. The medievalist Alois Wachtel from Bonn became its first director in 1966.

Alois Wachtel was succeeded as director by Karl Ferdinand Werner, who directed and significantly shaped the institute from 1968 to 1989, especially through his research on the Early Middle Ages. He founded the journal "Francia" and established events such as the “Jeudis” lecture series, which exists to this day. He also initiated the institute's relocation from Rue du Havre to a building on Rue Maspéro, which today houses Germany's Permanent Representation to the OECD. The steady increase in staff and library holdings necessitated after 20 years another change of location. Shortly before Werner's successor, Horst Möller (who later also headed the"Institut für Zeitgeschichte" in Munich), came into office, the Federal Republic of Germany bought the Hôtel Duret-de-Chevry, a Hôtel particulier whose construction was commissioned around 1620 by the senior royal official Charles Duret de Chevry near the Place des Vosges. On 19 May 1994 the new premises were inaugurated in a ceremony in the presence of then President of the Federal Republic of Germany Richard von Weizsäcker. The institute’s director from 1994 to 2007, Werner Paravicini, focused his research especially on Burgundy in the Late Middle Ages.

In 2002, the GHIP was incorporated into the Max Weber Foundation, an institution under public law. As an umbrella organization, it unites eleven partner institutions around the world today. Beginning in 2007, the digital humanities became the main focus of Gudrun Gersmann’s directorship. She launched comprehensive projects to (retro)digitize holdings and founded open access initiatives such as perspectiva.net. From 2013 to 2023, the institute was directed by the Swiss historian Thomas Maissen, who broadened the geographical scope of the Institute. In 2015, a research group on sub-Saharan Africa was founded in cooperation with the Cheikh Anta Diop University (UCAD) in Dakar, Senegal, and its Center for Research on Social Policies (CREPOS). With the creation of the transnational research group “The Bureaucratisation of African Societies“, a second cooperation phase with the CREPOS and the UCAD began in 2017 and ended as scheduled in 2021. Since 2018, the transnational research group is part of the “Maria Sibylla Merian Institute for Advanced Studies in Africa“ (MIASA) with headquarters in Accra. The MIASA Africa is carried by a number of partners, among them the GHIP, and funded by the German Federal Ministry of Education and Research (BMBF). The program investigates the topics of democratic governance, conflict management, and sustainable transformations. Since September 2023 the Institute has been directed by Klaus Oschema.

== Directors ==
The following have been directors of the Institute:

- 1966–1968 Alois Wachtel (de)
- 1968–1989 Karl Ferdinand Werner
- 1989–1992 Horst Möller
- 1993–2007 Werner Paravicini (de)
- 2007–2012 Gudrun Gersmann (de)
- 2013–2023 Thomas Maissen
- since 2023 Klaus Oschema (de)

== Mission and objectives ==
The main tasks of the GHIP are the following: research, mediation, and qualification.

=== Research ===
The GHIP conducts independent research, in most cases in cooperation with French partners, and supports the endeavours of international researchers working in the area of western European and African history in France or Germany. The items held in archives and libraries in Paris, and France at large, are particularly important in this context.

The historical research topics range from the Middle Ages until the 21st century. In the early phase, research projects on the Middle Ages and the Early Modern Age dominated the institute's work. Much effort was invested into securing the deeds and charters of the Merovingian Empire. Beginning in the 1970s, research in the areas of modern and contemporary history also became prominent. The institute has moreover begun to expand into new research areas with its Digital Humanities department and with the founding of the international research group on "The Bureaucratisation of African Societies" in 2015, which worked in cooperation with the Cheikh Anta Diop University in Dakar, Senegal until 2021. Since 2018, the GHIP has been involved in the Merian Institute for Advanced Studies in Africa (MIASA) in Accra, which conducts research on "Sustainable Governance."

In fundamental research projects, significant sources were collected and rendered available on data bases.

Regularly, guest researchers work at the GHIP in order to pursue own projects and, at the same time, to enrich the institute's research.

=== Mediation ===
The GHIP publishes its research findings in several formats: online, print journals and books. It manages a multilingual scientific library specialized in German history. In order to support cooperation among historians in Germany, France and around the world, the GHIP regularly hosts international colloquia, seminars and talks, for instance in the context of the “Jeudis de l’Institut historique allemand” lecture series Moreover, it takes part as a partner in German-French as well as international historical conferences.

=== Qualification ===
The GHIP supports young researchers in a German-French context with a wide range of opportunities. Summer schools, academic skills, language classes as well as field trips allow students to broaden their research horizons and to exchange with students and scholars from other countries. A wide offer of grants and fellowships enables residencies of various lengths in Paris, which are organized according to the specific needs and expectations of Master students, PhD candidates, post-doctoral researchers, and professors.

== Organization and research projects ==
At the GHIP, approximately forty staff members work in research and research services (library, editorial staff, event management, public relations, administration). An academic advisory board composed of nine German and French university professors of all historical periods supports and advises the work of the GHIP. The current chairwoman of the advisory board is Claudine Moulin, a German scholar at Trier university. The vice-chairwoman is Gabriele Metzler, a historian at Humboldt University.

The research projects are divided into five departments: Middle Ages, Early Modern History, Contemporary History, Digital Humanities and Africa.

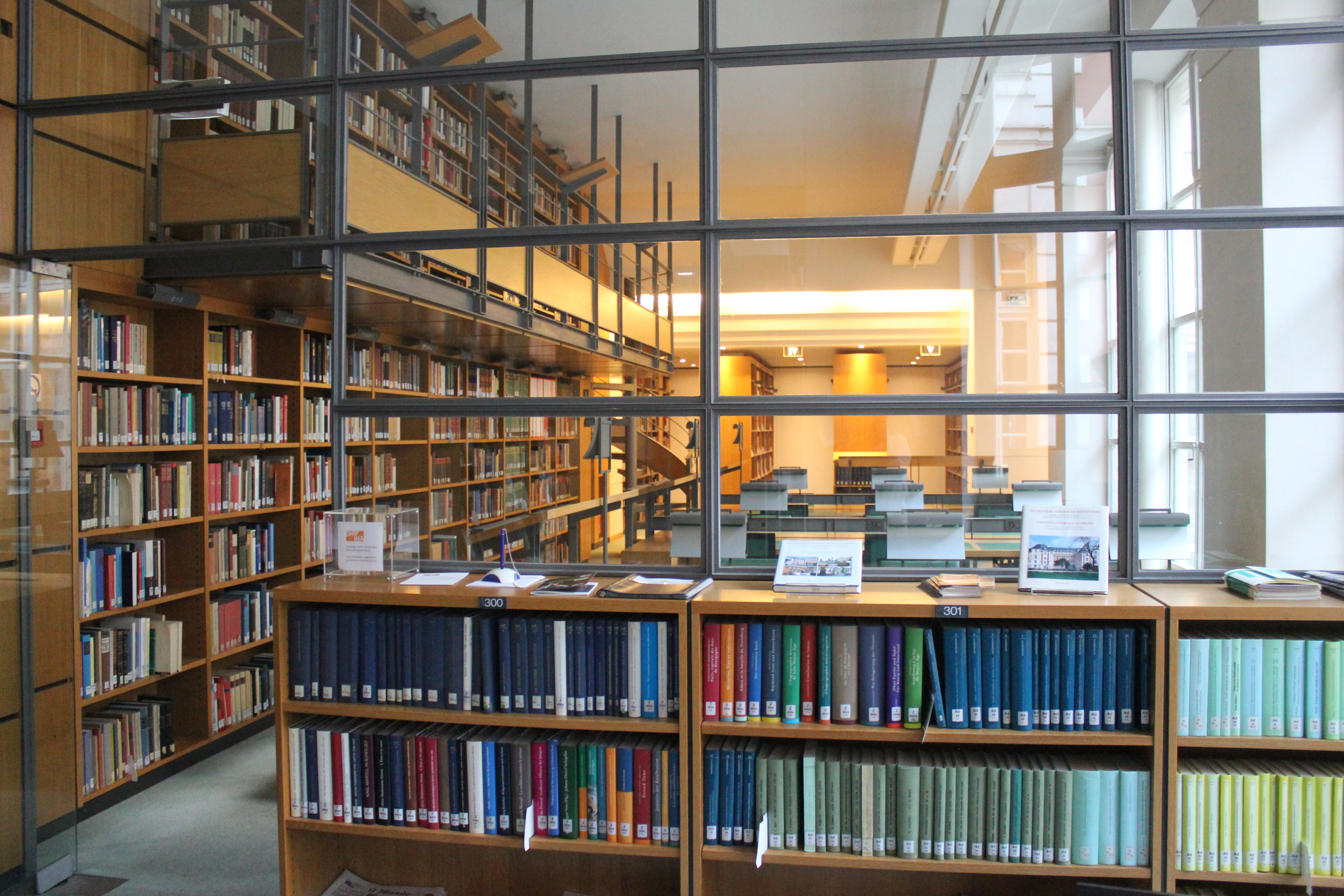
Library of the GHIP

== Library ==
The library of the GHIP is accessible for all scholars free of cost after the issuing of a library card. Forty-six reading stations and four catalogue terminals with Internet access are available in the reading room. The institute's library is a reference library; therefore, no items can be borrowed from the library's holdings. The library is connected to the German interlibrary loan. At present, it holds a total of approximately 120,000 media items and 350 continuously maintained periodicals. Besides its extensive collection on German and French history, the library has extensive special material on the relations between Germany and France as well as numerous items on western European history and German national history. A significant focus of the periodical collection is set on German regional journals. The library blogs Franco-Fil and Germano-Fil for information resources in France and Germany as well as regularly occurring seminars on information competence provide a useful research support for scholars.

== Publications ==
The GHIP publishes the own research findings as well as outstanding theses. A consistent access strategy allows to find all publications online.

The journal “Francia” has been published since 1973 and is the only German historical journal on the history of Western Europe. The articles are written in German, French or English. Their subject matter and timespan ranges from fourth-century archaeology to recent relationships between France and Germany. All volumes published to date, with the exception of the most recent volume, are available online. The “Francia” review catalogue has been released online since 2008 four times yearly as “Francia-Recensio”.

The volumes from the series “Beihefte der Francia” (Francia Supplements), which was founded in 1975, were merged with the Paris Historical Studies (PHS) in 2019. This is the oldest book series of the GHIP. It has been published in French, English, and German since 1962.

The 2005 initiated eleven-volume series “German-French History” appears in German and French and comprises the time span between 800 and the present.

The series “Studies and Documents on the Gallia Pontificia” is constituted of articles and source editions from the research area on deeds and letters of popes in France. All volumes are available as PDF in open access on perspectivia.net. The series has been completed since 2012.

As the project carrier of de.hypotheses.org, the GHIP operates thematic scientific blogs in addition to cross-epochal methodological blogs. The results of completed fundamental research projects of the GHIP as well as podcasts recordings of numerous lectures, which took place at the GHIP, are available on the website of the institute. Past colloquia and conferences such as the “discussions” are digitized retrospectively. Moreover, the GHIP was a partner of the German-French Journal for Humanities and Social Sciences “Trivium”, which renders translated outstanding French and German research accessible.

== Bibliography ==
- Karl Ferdinand Werner: Deutsches Historisches Institut 1958–1983. Institut Historique Allemand 1958–1983, Paris 1983.
- Gerd Krumeich: Das Deutsche Historische Institut in Paris (DHIP). In: Geschichte und Gesellschaft 13 (1987), p. 267–271.
- Werner Paravicini (ed.): Das Deutsche Historische Institut Paris. Festgabe aus Anlaß der Eröffnung seines neuen Gebäudes, des Hôtel Duret-de-Chevry, Thorbecke, Sigmaringen 1994.
  - idem: Du franco-allemand à l’histoire européenne. L’Institut historique allemand de Paris depuis 1964. In Allemagne d'aujourd'hui 162 (2002), p. 150–156.
  - idem: L’Institut historique allemand. Un lieu de recherche européenne à Paris. In: Précis analytique des travaux de l‘Académie des sciences, belles-lettres et arts de Rouen, 2003 (published December 2006), p. 225–234.
  - idem: Wie ist es eigentlich gewesen? Das Deutsche Historische Institut Paris. In: Revue des Deux Mondes, Paris 2005, p. 223–227. – L’Institut historique allemand de Paris: ce qui s’est réellement passé. In: Revue des Deux Mondes, Paris 2005, pp. 206–210.
- Ulrich Pfeil: Das Deutsche Historische Institut Paris. Eine Neugründung »sur base universitaire«. In idem (ed.): Deutsch-französische Kultur- und Wissenschaftsbeziehungen im 20. Jahrhundert. Ein institutionengeschichtlicher Ansatz, Oldenbourg, Munich 2007, p. 281–308. perspectivia.net
  - idem: Vorgeschichte und Gründung des „Deutschen Historischen Instituts“ Paris. Darstellung und Dokumentation, Instrumenta 17, Thorbecke, Ostfildern 2007. perspectivia.net
  - idem (ed.): Das „Deutsche Historische Institut“ Paris und seine Gründungsväter. Ein personengeschichtlicher Ansatz., Pariser Historische Studien 86, Oldenbourg, Munich 2007. perspectivia.net
  - idem, Die Gründung des Deutschen Historischen Instituts in Paris im Jahre 1958, in: Axel C. Hüntelmann, Michael C. Schneider (ed.), Jenseits von Humboldt. Wissenschaft im Staat 1850–1990, Frankfurt/M. 2010, p. 49–60.
- Rainer Babel, Rolf Große (ed.): Das Deutsche Historische Institut Paris / Institut historique allemand 1958–2008, Thorbecke, Ostfildern, 2008. perspectivia.net
- Rolf Große, Frankreichforschung am Deutschen Historischen Institut Paris, in: Jahrbuch der historischen Forschung in der Bundesrepublik Deutschland, Munich 2013, p. 21–27. hypotheses.org
- Matthias Werner: Die Anfänge des Deutschen Historischen Instituts in Paris und die Rückkehr der deutschen Geschichtswissenschaft in die „Ökumene der Historiker“, in: Rheinische Vierteljahrsblätter 79 (2015), p. 212-245.
- Rolf Große, Die Entstehungsgeschichte des DHI Paris, in: Jürgen Elvert (ed.), Geschichte jenseits der Universität. Netzwerke und Organisationen der frühen Bundesrepublik, Stuttgart 2016 (Historische Mitteilungen, Beiheft, 94), p. 141‒153.
