= HRA =

HRA may refer to:

== Health and medicine ==
- Health risk assessment
- Health Reimbursement Account or Arrangement, US
- Health Research Authority, UK

== Sport ==
- Home runs allowed
- Horseracing Regulatory Authority, now merged into the British Horseracing Authority

== Organisations ==
- Havering Residents Association
- Heritage Railway Association, British Isles
- Hindustan Republican Association
- Hotel & Restaurant Association of Great Britain
- Human Rights Activists in Iran
- New York City Human Resources Administration

== Science and technology ==
- Heidelberg Research Architecture
- High Redundancy Actuation, a concept in fault tolerant control
- Honda Research America
- HRA, a Rockwell scale of materials' hardness
- Human reliability analysis, estimation of human error rate

== Other uses ==
- H & R Firearms, marking on arms (for H&R Arms)
- Hariah railway station, Pakistan, station code
- Herra, a Finnish honorific
- Hrangkhol language of India, ISO 639-3 code
- Human Rights Act (disambiguation)
- Human resource accounting
- High Risk Area for piracy around the Horn of Africa

== See also ==
- HRAS, gene that encodes transforming protein p21
