= Thomas Maissen =

Swiss-German historian

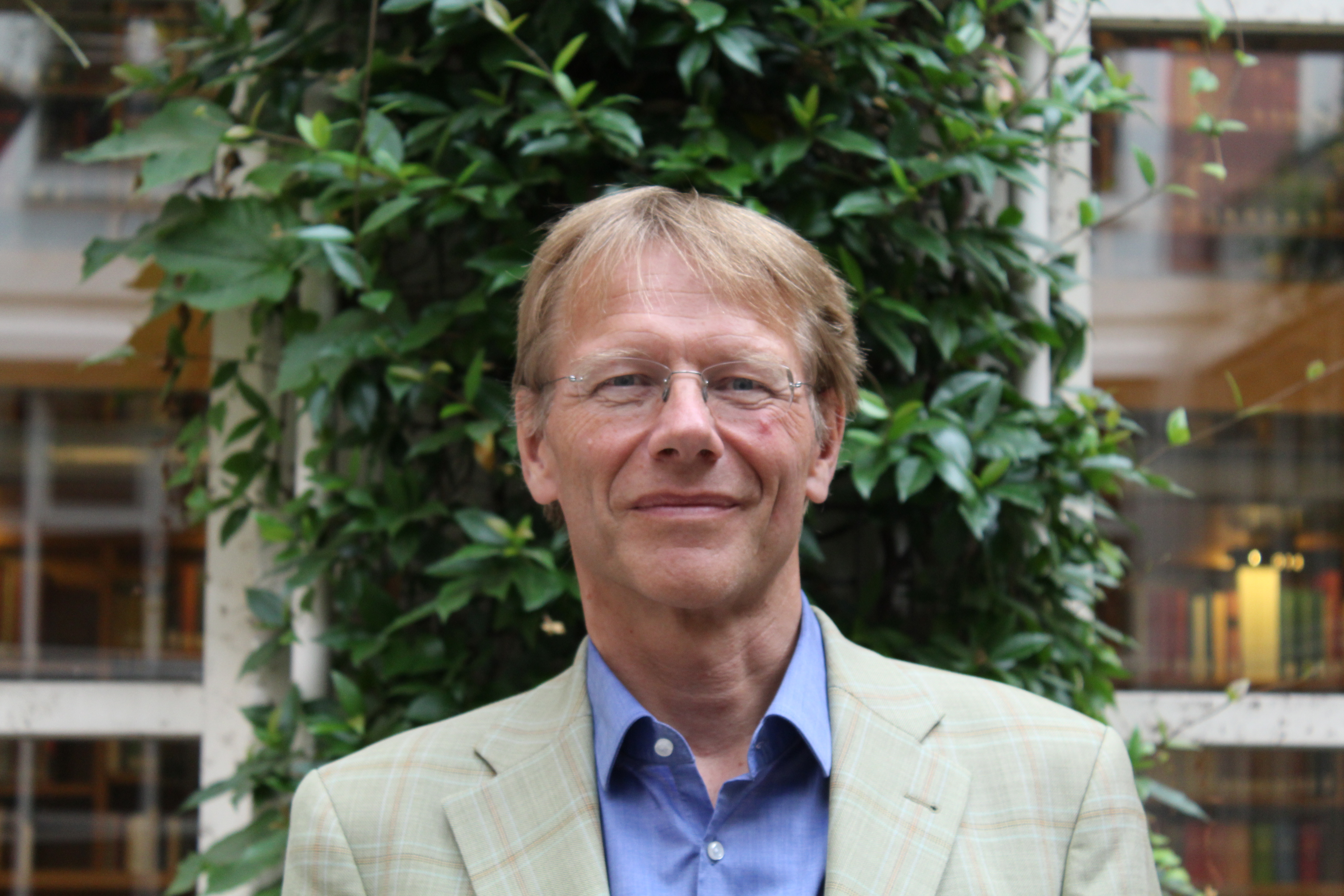
- Born: October 23, 1962 (age 63); Zurich, Switzerland

Academic work
- Discipline: Modern history
- Institutions: Heidelberg University

Thomas Maissen (born 23 October 1962 in Zurich, Switzerland) is a professor of modern history at Heidelberg University and co-director of the Cluster of Excellence "Asia and Europe in a Global Context". From 2013 to 2023 he was director of the German Historical Institute in Paris.

== Career ==
Born to a Finnish mother and a Swiss father, Maissen studied history, Latin and philosophy in Basel, Rome, and Geneva. He completed his dissertation in 1993 under the guidance of the Swiss historian Hans Rudolf Guggisberg. Afterwards, he worked as an assistant professor at the Chair for Early Modern History at the University of Potsdam. From 1996 to 1999, he received fellowships for his habilitation from the Swiss National Science Foundation and other funds and habilitated in 2002 at the University of Zurich with his work Die Geburt der Republic. Staatsverständnis und Repräsentation in der frühneuzeitlichen Eidgenossenschaft. From 2002 to 2004, he was associate professor at the University of Lucerne. In addition, from 1996 onwards, he has worked for eight years as editor for the Neue Zürcher Zeitung where he was responsible for the "Historical Analysis". Since 2004, Maissen is full professor for early modern history at Heidelberg University.

In 2006, Maissen became a full member of the Heidelberg Academy of Sciences and Humanities and of the Kommission für geschichtliche Landeskunde (Commission for Historical Regional Studies) in Baden-Württemberg. In addition, he was the founder and speaker of the Heidelberg Graduate School for Humanities and Social Sciences from 2007 to 2012. From 2008 to 2013, Maissen was the coordinator of the joint master programme degree at the Heidelberg University and the École des hautes études en sciences sociales (EHESS). In 2008, Maissen became one of the founding members and principal investigators of the Cluster of Excellence "Asia and Europe in a Global Context". From 2009 to 2013, he served as a member of the steering committee and eventually, in 2013, as a co-director of the cluster. In 2009, he was a visiting professor at the EHESS and in 2010 he was a visiting fellow at the Institute for Advanced Study in Princeton, New Jersey. Moreover, from 2009 to 2011, he was a fellow of the research seminar "Legitimität und Religion" at the Centre for Religion, Economy and Politics, which is a joint undertaking by the universities of Basel, Lausanne, Lucerne, and Zurich and the Collegium Helveticum. From 2012 to 2013, he was a fellow of the Marsilius-Kolleg at Heidelberg University.

In September 2013, he became the first non-German director of the German Historical Institute in Paris (GHIP). Under his leadership, the GHIP widened its geographic focus and initiated a cooperation with the Cheikh Anta Diop University in Dakar through the creation of the research group “La bureaucratisation des sociétés africaines” in 2015.

== Research ==
Maissen works on the history of historiography, the history of political ideas and constitutional history, especially republicanism, (religious) mentalities, collective identities, and representations. Furthermore, he is interested in concepts of history, Swiss history, and the history of education. In his dissertation, Maissen investigated how Italians of the Renaissance interpreted the French past His habilitation dealt with "The Birth of the Republic. Concept of the State and Representation in the Early Modern Period of the Swiss Confederation". In his book “Schweizer Heldengeschichten“ (2015), he confronted political discourses of right wing Swiss politicians Christoph Blocher and Ueli Maurer with the current state of historical research. This study catalyzed a vivid debate in the media and was described as the “Swiss Historikerstreit”.

== Publications ==
=== Monographs ===
Maissen has published the following monographs:

- 25 Jahre Roche AG Sisseln. Editiones Roche, Basel 1990, ISBN 3-907946-31-6.
- Von der Legende zum Modell. Das Interesse an Frankreichs Vergangenheit während der italienischen Renaissance (= Basler Beiträge zur Geschichtswissenschaft. Bd. 166). Helbing und Lichtenhahn, Basel u. a. 1994, ISBN 3-7190-1369-3 (zugleich: Basel, Universität, Dissertation, 1993).
- With Katri Burri: Bilder aus der Schweiz. 1939–1945. Verlag Neue Zürcher Zeitung, Zürich 1997, ISBN 3-85823-680-2 (2. Auflage, ebenda 1998, ISBN 3-85823-730-2).
- Vom Sonderbund zum Bundesstaat. Krise und Erneuerung 1798–1848 im Spiegel der NZZ. Verlag Neue Zürcher Zeitung, Zürich 1998, ISBN 3-85823-742-6.
- With Michael Kempe: Die Collegia der Insulaner, Vertraulichen und Wohlgesinnten in Zürich 1679–1709. Die ersten deutschsprachigen Aufklärungsgesellschaften zwischen Naturwissenschaften. Bibelkritik, Geschichte und Politik. Verlag Neue Zürcher Zeitung, Zürich 2002, ISBN 3-85823-954-2.
- Die Geschichte der NZZ 1780–2005. Verlag Neue Zürcher Zeitung, Zürich 2005, ISBN 3-03823-134-7.
- Die Geschichte der Neuen Zürcher Zeitung, 1780-2005, Neue Züricher Zeitung Libro, Zurich 2005. ISBN 978-3038231349.
- Verweigerte Erinnerung. Nachrichtenlose Vermögen und die Schweizer Weltkriegsdebatte 1989–2004. Verlag Neue Zürcher Zeitung, Zürich 2005, ISBN 3-03823-046-4 (2. Auflage, ebenda 2005, ISBN 3-03823-204-1.
- Die Geburt der Republic. Staatsverständnis und Repräsentation in der frühneuzeitlichen Eidgenossenschaft (= Historische Semantik. Bd. 4). Vandenhoeck & Ruprecht, Göttingen 2006, ISBN 3-525-36706-6 (2., veränderte Auflage, ebenda 2008, ISBN 978-3-525-36706-3; zugleich: Zürich, Universität, Habilitations-Schrift, 2001; ausgezeichnet mit dem Buchpreis «Das Historische Buch 2007» für das beste historische Buch des Jahres 2006, Kategorie Frühe Neuzeit (HSozuKult)).
- Die Geschichte der Schweiz, Reclam, Baden 2010 (ISBN 978-3-03919-174-1.
- Geschichte der Schweiz. hier + jetzt, Verlag für Kultur und Geschichte, Baden 2010, ISBN 978-3-03919-174-1 2. Aufl. 2010; 3., erweiterte Auflage: 2011; 4. Aufl. 2012; fünfte, überarbeitete Auflage 2015. Deutsche Lizenzausgabe Reclam, Broschur: 1. und 2. Aufl. 2015; Reclam Universalbibliothek 2017; Albanische Übersetzung: Historia e Zviczres, Tirana 2013; serbische Übersetzung: Istorija švajcarske, Belgrad 2014, als Taschenbuchausgabe 2015; bulgarische Übersetzung: История иа Швейцария, Sofia 2014; italienische Übersetzung: Svizzera. Storia di una fede¬ra¬zione, Triest 2015.
- Schweizer Geschichte im Bild. hier + jetzt, Verlag für Kultur und Geschichte, Baden 2012, ISBN 978-3-03919-244-1.
- Geschichte der Frühen Neuzeit (C. H. Beck-Wissen. Bd. 2760). Beck, München 2013, ISBN 978-3-406-65472-5.
- Schweizer Heldengeschichten – und was dahintersteckt. hier + jetzt, Verlag für Kultur und Geschichte, Baden 2015, ISBN 978-3-03919-340-0 (Print); ISBN 978-3-03919-902-0 (eBook) (5. Aufl. 2016).
- With Barbara Mittler: Why China did not have a Renaissance – and why that matters. An interdisciplinary Dialogue. Berlin 2018, ISBN 978-3110573961.
- I miti svizzeri. Realtà e retroscena. Armando Dadò Editore, Locarno 2018 ISBN 978-88-8281-459-5.
- Histoire de la Suisse. Septentrion, Villeneuve d’Asq 2019 ISBN 978-2757424643.

=== Edited books ===
- With Gerrit Walther: Funktionen des Humanismus. Studien zum Nutzen des Neuen in der humanistischen Kultur. Wallstein-Verlag, Göttingen 2006, ISBN 3-8353-0025-3.
- With André Holenstein, Maarten Prak: The Republican Alternative. The Netherlands and Switzerland compared. Amsterdam University Press, Amsterdam 2008, ISBN 978-908-964-005-5.
- With Irène Herrmann: Problem Schweizergeschichte?. Themenheft Schweizer Zeitschrift für Geschichte 59, Nr. 1 (2009), ISBN 978-3-03919-174-1.
- With Fania Oz-Salzberger: The Liberal–Republican Quandary in Israel, Europe and the United States. Early Modern Thought Meets Current Affairs. Academic Studies Press, Boston MA 2012, ISBN 978-1-936235-55-1.
- With Annette Kämmerer, Michael Wink und Thomas Kuner: Gewalt und Altruismus. Interdisziplinäre Annäherungen an ein grundlegendes Thema des Humanen (= Schriften des Marsilius-Kollegs. Bd. 14). Winter, Heidelberg 2015, ISBN 978-3-8253-6441-0.
- With Manuela Albertone und Susan Richter: Languages of Reform in the Eighteenth Century, Oxford 2019, ISBN 978-036-785-501-7.
- With Pierre Monnet, Jean-Louis Georget und Barbara Mittler: L’usage de la temporalité dans les sciences sociales: approche interdisciplinaire, Bochum 2019.
