= Rudolf Wagner (disambiguation) =

Rudolf Wagner (1805–1864) was a German anatomist and physiologist.

Rudolf Wagner may also refer to:

- Rudolf G. Wagner (born 1941), German sinologist
- Rudolf Wagner-Régeny (1903–1969), Romanian composer and musician
- Rudolf Wagner (pilot) (1921–1943), German Luftwaffe fighter pilot
