= Axel Michaels =

German Indologist

Axel Michaels (born 26 May 1949) is a Professor of Classical Indology and Religious Studies at Heidelberg University, former Co-Director of the Cluster of Excellence "Asia and Europe in a Global Context" (2014-2019) and since 2014 the Director of the research project Documents on the History of Religion and Law of Pre-modern Nepal. He also was the Speaker of the Collaborative Research Centre SFB 619 “Ritual Dynamics” from 2002 until 2013.

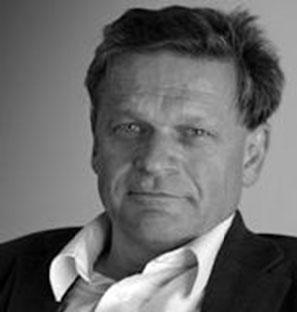
Axel Michaels

== Professional career ==
Born in Hamburg, Axel Michaels studied Indology, philosophy and law in Munich, Freiburg, Hamburg and Benares. After he completed his dissertation in 1978 summa cum laude, Michaels worked as a research assistant at the Museum of Ethnology in Hamburg and at the University of Münster. He then worked as an assistant professor at the Department of Indology at the University of Kiel (1980 until 1992), meanwhile also holding the position as the Director of the Nepal Research Center (Kathmandu) from 1981 to 1983. From 1992 to 1996 Professor of Religious Studies at the University of Bern. In 1986, he was Spalding Visiting Fellow at the Wolfson College, Oxford. Since 1996, Michaels is professor of classical Indology at Heidelberg University’s South Asia Institute, which he managed as Director from 1999 to 2002. Besides, he was Speaker of the interdisciplinary project “Cartography Programme on Benares”. In 2001, he was elected as the Speaker of the Collaborative Research Centre SFB 619 “Ritual Dynamics”. During the years 2004 to 2011, he was Speaker of the German Research Foundation Council “Cultural Anthropology, Religious Studies, Non-European Cultures”. Axel Michaels was co-founder and co-director of the Cluster of Excellence “Asia and Europe in a Global Context” since 2007 until 2017. Furthermore, he became Head Coordinator of the Heidelberg Center South Asia (2014 until 2019) and Member of AG Zukunft II at Heidelberg University in 2010. Since 2010 he is Heidelberg University Rector’s delegate for cooperation with India. Axel Michaels is full member of the Heidelberg Academy of Sciences and Humanities since 2006, where he functioned as vice president from 2016 to 2020. Since 2020 he is Chairman of the board of trustees of the von Portheim-Stiftung.

== Research ==
From 1983 to 1984, Michaels was involved in a project about the initiation rites in Nepal in collaboration with the German Research Foundation. A further project in Nepal between 1984 and 1991 focused on rituals at the Pashupatinatha-Temple. From 1998 to 2002, Axel Michaels was engaged in the project “Text and Context of the Mahima-Dharma-Movement in Orissa”. This project was followed by a research on religious and divine maps of Benares (1999-2003). Both projects were supported by the German Research Foundation (DFG). In 2002 he started a project in co-operation with Niels Gutschow which examined life cycle rituals in Nepal. Connected to the project was the shooting and production of the films Handling Death (2005) and Belfruit and loincloth (2007), realized in collaboration with Niels Gutschow and Christian Bau. Later, he also worked on a project aiming at the translation and publication of the so called “Wright-chronicle”, which was funded by the German Research Foundation (DFG, 2011 to 2012). Currently, he is working on two research projects. The first project started in 2014, called “Religious and Legal Documents of Pre-modern Nepal”, and aims at a publication and a digital database of religious and legal documents and texts from pre-modern Nepal. The second, the “Nepal Heritage Documentation Project” is a co-operation with Christiane Brosius and started in 2018.

Axel Michaels’ fields of research include Ethno-Indology, Ritual studies, Social and Legal History of Hinduism, Cultural History and Religion of Nepal.

== Selected publications ==
Publications

- Nepal: A History from the Earliest Times to the Present. New York, NY: Oxford University Press. (An English-language version of Kultur und Geschichte Nepals)
- Kultur und Geschichte Nepals. Stuttgart: Kröner Verlag 2018.
- Homo ritualis. Hindu Rituals and its Significance for Ritual Theory. Oxford, New York: Oxford University Press 2016.
- with Manik Bajracharya and Niels Gutschow, Nepālikabhūpa-Vaṃśāvalī: History of the Kings of Nepal – A Buddhist Chronicle. Kathmandu: Himal Books, 2016. – vol. 1: Manik Bajracharya and Axel Michaels, Introduction and Translation; vol. 2: Manik Bajracharya and Axel Michaels, Edition; vol. 3: Niels Gutschow, Maps and Illustrations, 2016.
- Getting Married – Hindu and Buddhist Marriage Rituals among Newars of Bhaktapur und Patan, Nepal. With Niels Gutschow. Includes a Film on DVD by Christian Bau. Wiesbaden: Harrassowitz Verlag (Ethno-Indology). 2012.
- Buddha – Leben, Lehre, Legende. München: C.H. Beck (C.H. Beck - Wissen). 2011.
- Manusmrti – Manus Gesetzbuch (translated from Sanskrit and published with support from Anand Mishra). Berlin: Verlag der Weltreligionen. 2010.
- Śiva in Trouble – Festivals and Rituals at the Paśupatinātha Temple of Deopatan (Nepal). Oxford, New York: Oxford University Press. 2008.
- Growing Up – Hindu and Buddhist Initiation Rituals among Newar Children in Bhaktapur, Nepal. With Niels Gutschow. Includes a Film on DVD by Christian Bau. Wiesbaden: Harrassowitz Verlag (Ethno-Indology). 2008.
- The Price of Purity: The Religious Judge in 19th Century Nepal. Containing the Edition and Translation of the Chapters on the Dharmādhikārin in Two (Mulukī) Ains. Torino: CESMEO, (Comitato „Corpus Juris Sancriticum et fontes iuris Asiae Meridianae et Centralis”). 2006.
- Encountering Jesus & Buddha: Their Lives and Teachings. With Ulrich Luz. Translated by Linda M. Maloney. Minneapolis: Fortress. 2006.
- Handling Death. The Dynamics of Death and Ancestor Rituals Among the Newars of Bhaktapur, Nepal. With Niels Gutschow. With Contributions by Johanna Buss and Nutan Sharma and a Film on DVD by Christian Bau. Wiesbaden: Harrassowitz Verlag. 2005.
- Die Kunst des einfachen Lebens. Eine Kulturgeschichte der Askese. München: C.H. Beck. 2004.
- Hinduism. Past and Present. Transl. (1998) by Barbara Harshaw. Princeton: Princeton University Press. 2004. (German Original: Der Hinduismus: Geschichte und Gegenwart. München 1998. 2nd edition 2006).
- Reisen der Götter. Der nepalische Pashupatinatha-Tempel und sein rituelles Umfeld. 2 Pts. With A. Michaels, G. Tandan. With drawings by Harald Fritzenkötter, Pashupatikshetra - Maps of Deoptan. Bonn: VGH Wissenschaftsverlag. 2004.
- Benares - Tempel und religiöses Leben in der heiligen Stadt der Hindus. With Niels Gutschow. Köln: DuMont Buchverlag. 1993.
- The Making of a Statue. Lost-wax Casting in Nepal. Stuttgart: Franz Steiner Verlag. 1988.
- Beweisverfahren in der vedischen Sakralgeometrie - Ein Beitrag zur Entstehungsgeschichte von Wissenschaft. Wiesbaden: Franz Steiner Verlag (Alt- und Neu-Indische Studien). 1978.

Edited Books

- with Christoph Wulf: Science and Scientification in South Asia and Europe. London and New York: Routledge, 2020.
- with Margareta Pavaloi: The Scholar’s Choice. Lieblingsstücke Heidelberger Wissenschaftler aus dem Völkerkundemuseum der J. und E. von Portheim-Stiftung. Heidelberg: heiUP, 2019.
- with Simon Cubelic and Astrid Zotter: Studies in Historical Documents from Nepal and India. Heidelberg: Heidelberg University Publishing (open access: https://heiup.uni-heidelberg.de/catalog/book/331). Reprint: Kathmandu: National Archives, 2018.
- with Christoph Wulf: Exploring the Senses. London, New York & New Delhi: Routledge (South Asian and European Perspectives on Rituals and Performances; 3), 2014.
- with Christiane Brosius & Paula Schrode: Ritual und Ritualdynamik. Schlüssel-begriffe, Theorien, Diskussionen. Göttingen: Vandenhoeck & Ruprecht, 2013.
- Emotions in Rituals and Performance. With Christoph Wulf. London, New York, New Delhi: Routledge (South Asian and European Perspectives on Rituals and Performances). 2012.
- Images of the Body in India. With Christoph Wulf. London, New York, New Delhi: Routledge (South Asian and European Perspectives on Rituals and Performances). 2011.
- Ritual Dynamics and the Science of Ritual. 5 vols. Wiesbaden: Harrassowitz. (Gen. Ed.). 2010/11.
- Grammar and Morphology of Ritual, Section I of Grammars and Morphologies of Ritual Practices in Asia. With Anand Mishra Wiesbaden: Harrassowitz. 3-353 (Dynamics of Rituals). 2010.
- Sacred Landscape of the Himalaya. With Niels Gutschow, Charles Ramble and Ernst Steinkellner. Vienna: Austrian Academy of Sciences Press. 2003.
- The Pandit: Traditional Scholarship in India. [Festschrift P. Aithal]. New Delhi: Manohar (South Asian Studies). 2001.
- Wild Goddesses in India and Nepal. Proceedings of an International Symposium in Berne and Zurich November 1994. Jointly ed. with Cornelia Vogelsanger and Annette Wilke. Bern: Peter Lang (Studia Religiosa Helvetica). 1996.
- A Rama Temple in 19th Century Nepal. The Ramacandra Temple in Battisputali, Kathmandu. Stuttgart: Franz Steiner Verlag (Publications of the Nepal Research Centre) 1995.
- Heritage of the Kathmandu Valley - Proceedings of an International Conference in Lübeck, June 1986. Jointly ed. with Niels Gutschow. 511 pp. St. Augustin: VGH Wissenschaftsverlag (Nepalica). 1987.
