= Rudolf G. Wagner =

German sinologist (1941–2019)

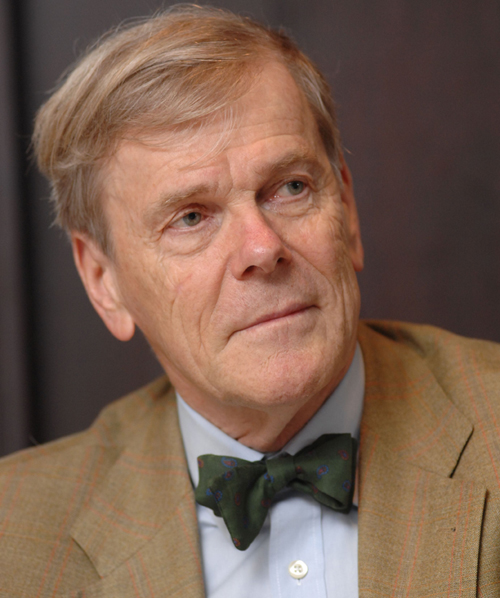
Rudolf G. Wagner

Rudolf G. Wagner (3 November 1941–25 October 2019) was a German sinologist. He was a Senior Professor at the Department of Chinese Studies at Heidelberg University and Co-Director of the Cluster of Excellence "Asia and Europe in a Global Context: Shifting Asymmetries in Cultural Flows".

== Professional career ==
Rudolf G. Wagner studied sinology, Japanese studies, political science and philosophy at the University of Bonn, Heidelberg University, the University of Paris, and LMU Munich between 1962 and 1969. Wagner was head of the student government (AStA) of LMU Munich from 1968 to 1969, where he completed his dissertation on the Buddhist studies topic “Hui-yuan慧遠's Questions to Kumarajiva鳩摩羅什” in 1969. As Harkness Fellow of the Commonwealth Fund, he did research for one year each at Harvard University and the University of California, Berkeley. From 1972 on, Wagner was an Assistant Professor of Sinology at the Free University of Berlin for five years. His habilitation thesis “Philology, Philosophy and Politics in the Zhengshi正始 Era”, which he completed at the Free University Berlin in 1981, deals with the Laozi 老子commentary by Wang Bi 王弼 (226–249). It was published in English and translated into Chinese.
During the following years, Wagner was a Fellow at the Society for the Humanities at Cornell University (1981–1982), a Research Fellow at the John K. Fairbank Center for East Asian Research at Harvard (1984, 1986–87) and Research Linguist at the Center for Chinese Studies at Berkeley (1984–1986). He also worked as a freelance science journalist for the radio station Sender Freies Berlin. From 1973 to 1981, he was editor of the journal Befreiung. Zeitschrift für Wissenschaft und Politik.
In 1987, Wagner accepted the Chair of Sinology at Heidelberg University. He worked at the Academy of Social Sciences Beijing in China and was a visiting professor at Harvard University. In 1993, he received the highest German academic award, the Gottfried Wilhelm Leibniz Prize of the German Research Foundation. This award, supplemented by a large grant from the Alfried Krupp von Bohlen und Halbach Foundation, was used to develop the library and the digital research environment at the Heidelberg Institute of Chinese Studies. He was elected member of the Berlin-Brandenburg Academy of Sciences in 1995.

Wagner’s reputation as a Sinologist goes far beyond the German borders. From September 1992 until August 1996, he was Secretary General and from 1996 until 1998 President of the European Association of Chinese Studies. Since 2010, Wagner was editor of Transcultural Studies. He also was a member of the Editorial Board of scholarly journals in the US (Early China), France (Extreme Orient/Extreme Occident), the UK (China Quarterly), the PRC (Zhongguo xueshu中國學術（simplified: 中国学术）), and Taiwan.

Since 2007, Wagner was Co-Director at the Cluster of Excellence "Asia and Europe in a Global Context" and since 2009 was Senior Professor at the Department of Sinology of Heidelberg University.

== Research ==
In his research, Rudolf G. Wagner focused on the interface of politics and culture in China. Owing his hermeneutical approach much to his study with Hans-Georg Gadamer in Heidelberg, Wagner’s main works dealt in the pre-modern period with the philosopher Wang Bi, and in the modern period with transcultural linkages of the modern Chinese media, political movements, and key terms of state and society. Supported by the Volkswagen Foundation, he published three volumes on Wang Bi’s works:

- The Craft of a Chinese Commentator: Wang Bi on the Laozi (2000)
- Language, Ontology, and Political Philosophy in China: Wang Bi's Scholarly Exploration of the Dark (Xuanxue) (2003)
- A Chinese Reading of the Daodejing: Wang Bi's commentary on the Laozi with critical text and translation (2003)
- Chinese edition: 瓦格納, trsl. Yang Lihua 杨立华, Wang Bi <Laozi zhu> yanjiu 王弼《老子注》研究. 2 vols. Nanjing: Jiangsu Renmin Chubanshe, 2008, 940 p.

Other publications dealt with the Taiping Rebellion; contemporary Chinese literature (prose and historical drama); the development of the early Chinese press, in particular the Shenbao newspaper in Shanghai under Ernest Major; the literature of the “socialist camp”; and the development of a transculturally shared canon of political keywords and images.

== Publications ==
Selected Publications

- "China ‘Asleep’ and ‘Awakening’. A Study in Conceptualizing Asymmetry and Coping with It", Transcultural Studies 1 (2011), 4–139.
- "The Zhouli as the Late Qing Path to the Future", in Benjamin A. Elman, Martin Kern eds., Statecraft and Classical Learning. The Rituals of Zhou in East Asian History. Leiden: Brill, 2009, 359–387.
- (Ed.) Joining the Global Public: Word, Image, and City in Early Chinese Newspapers, 1870–1910. Albany, NY: State Univ. of New York Press, 2007.
- The contemporary Chinese historical drama: four studies. Berkeley: University of California Press, 1990 (1985).
- Inside a Service Trade. Studies in Contemporary Chinese Prose. Harvard-Yenching Institute monograph series; 34. Cambridge, Mass.: Harvard University Press, 1992.
- Reenacting the Heavenly Vision: The Role of Religion in the Taiping Rebellion. China Research Monograph; 25. Center for Chinese Studies. Berkeley: University of California, 1984.

== Personal life ==
Wagner was married to Catherine Vance Yeh, Ph.D., Harvard University, who is now a professor at Boston University. He had two daughters from his first marriage.
