= Bill of rights =

Proclamation of fundamental rights to citizens of a polity

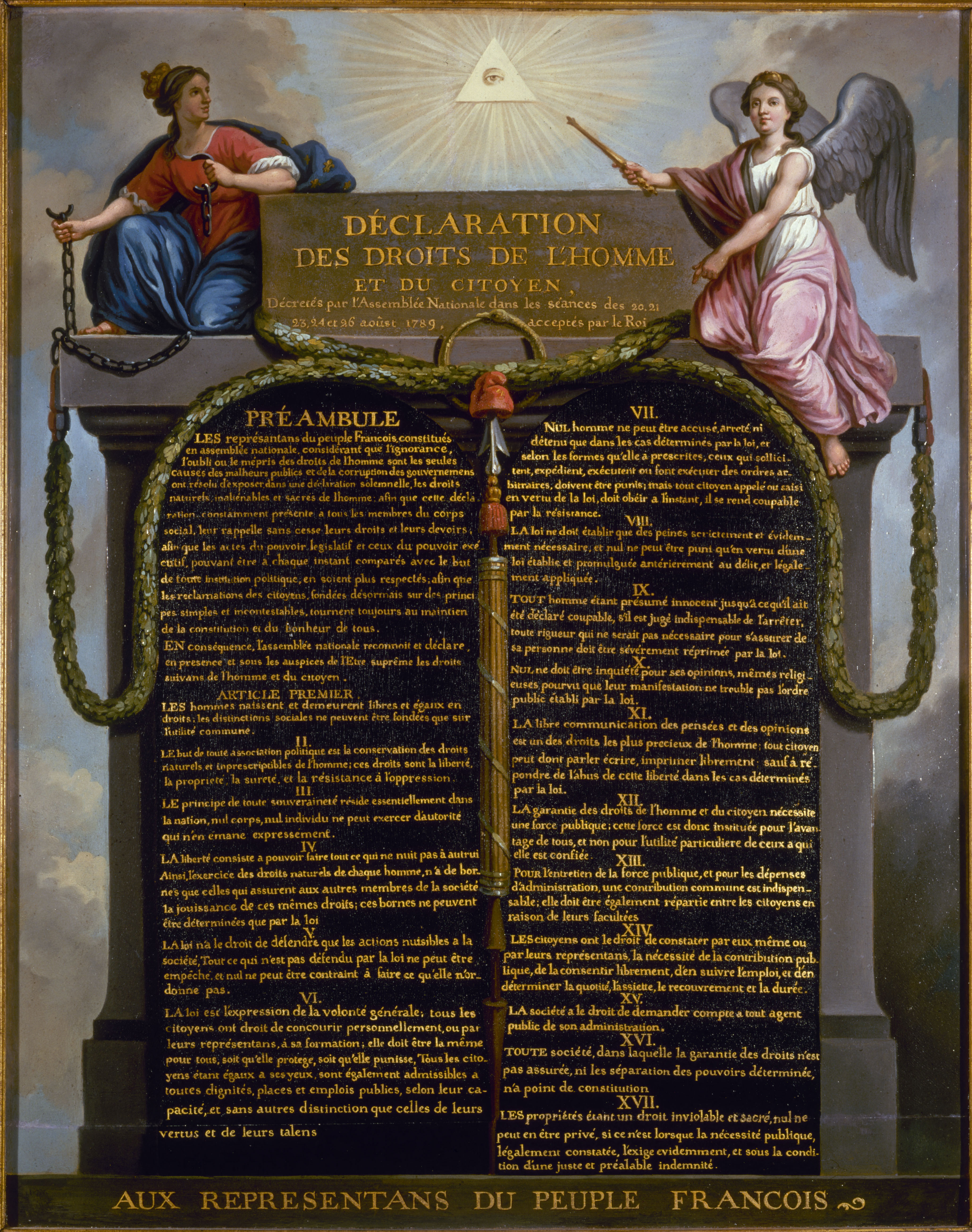
The Declaration of the Rights of Man and of the Citizen of 1789 is a fundamental document of the French Revolution and in the history of human rights.

Draft of the United States Bill of Rights, also from 1789

A bill of rights, sometimes called a declaration of rights or a charter of rights, is a list of the most important rights to the citizens of a country. The purpose is to protect those rights against infringement from public officials and private citizens.

Bills of rights may be entrenched or unentrenched. An entrenched bill of rights cannot be amended or repealed by a country's legislature through regular procedure, instead requiring a supermajority or referendum; often it is part of a country's constitution, and therefore subject to special procedures applicable to constitutional amendments.

== History ==
The history of legal charters asserting certain rights for particular groups goes back to the Middle Ages and earlier. An example is Magna Carta, an English legal charter agreed between the King and his barons in 1215. In the early modern period, there was renewed interest in Magna Carta. English common law judge Sir Edward Coke revived the idea of rights based on citizenship (see history of citizenship) by arguing that Englishmen had historically enjoyed such rights. The Petition of Right 1628, the Habeas Corpus Act 1679 and the Bill of Rights 1689 (English Bill of Rights) established certain rights in statute.

In the Thirteen Colonies, the English Bill of Rights was one of the influences on the 1776 Virginia Declaration of Rights, which in turn influenced the United States Declaration of Independence later that year. After the Constitution of the United States was adopted in 1789, the United States Bill of Rights was ratified in 1791. The U.S. Constitution and Bill of Rights were influenced by British constitutional history.

Inspired by the Age of Enlightenment, the Declaration of the Rights of Man and of the Citizen asserted the universality of rights. It was adopted in 1789 by France's National Constituent Assembly, during the period of the French Revolution.

The 20th century saw different groups draw on these earlier documents for influence when drafting the Universal Declaration of Human Rights, the European Convention on Human Rights and the United Nations Convention on the Rights of the Child.

== Exceptions in Western democracies ==
The constitution of the United Kingdom remains uncodified. However, the Bill of Rights 1689 is part of UK law. The Human Rights Act 1998 also incorporates the rights contained in the European Convention on Human Rights into UK law. In the 21st century, there were proposals for a British Bill of Rights and the UK Parliament debated a Bill of Rights Bill but it was not passed into legislation.

Australia is the only common law country with neither a constitutional nor federal legislative bill of rights to protect its citizens, although there is ongoing debate in many of Australia's states. In 1973, Federal Attorney-General Lionel Murphy introduced a human rights Bill into parliament, although it was never passed. In 1984, Senator Gareth Evans drafted a Bill of Rights, but it was never introduced into parliament, and in 1985, Senator Lionel Bowen introduced a bill of rights, which was passed by the House of Representatives, but failed to pass the Senate. Former Australian Prime Minister John Howard has argued against a bill of rights for Australia on the grounds it would transfer power from elected politicians to unelected judges and bureaucrats. Victoria, Queensland and the Australian Capital Territory (ACT) are the only states and territories to have a human rights Act. However, the principle of legality present in the Australian judicial system, seeks to ensure that legislation is interpreted so as not to interfere with basic human rights, unless legislation expressly intends to interfere.

== List of bills of rights ==
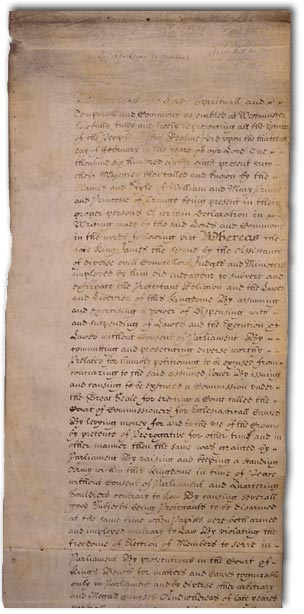
The Bill of Rights 1689 is an Act of the Parliament of England asserting certain rights.

=== General ===
Title	Effective year	Realm	Notes
Charter of Liberties	1100	England	Rights of inheritance and marriage, amnesty, and environmental protection
Magna Carta	1215	England	Rights for barons
Great Charter of Ireland	1216	Ireland	Rights for barons
Golden Bull of 1222	1222	Hungary	Rights for nobles
Statute of Kalisz	1264	Poland	Jewish residents' rights
Charter of Kortenberg	1312	Brabant	Rights for all citizens "rich and poor"
Dušan's Code	1349	Serbia	
Twelve Articles	1525	Swabian League	
Pacta conventa	1573	Poland–Lithuania	
Henrician Articles	1573	Poland–Lithuania	
Petition of Right	1628	England	
Declaration of Right, 1689; Bill of Rights 1689; Claim of Right Act 1689	1689	England; & Scotland	This applied to all British Colonies of the time, and was later entrenched in the laws of those colonies that became nations—for instance in Australia with the Colonial Laws Validity Act 1865 and reconfirmed by the Statute of Westminster 1931
Virginia Declaration of Rights	1776	United States: Virginia	June 1776, Preamble to the United States Declaration of Independence, July 1776
Chapter 1 of the Pennsylvania Constitution	1776	United States: Pennsylvania	July 1776
Declaration of the Rights of Man and of the Citizen	1789	France	
Bill of Rights of the United States Constitution	1791	United States	Completed in 1789, ratified in 1791
Declaration of the Rights of the People	1811	Venezuela	
Article I of the Constitution of Connecticut	1818	United States: Connecticut	
Constitution of Greece	1822	Greece	
Hatt-ı Hümayun	1856	Ottoman Empire	
Article I of the Constitution of Texas	1875	United States: Texas	
Basic rights and liberties in Finland	1919	Finland	
Implied Bill of Rights (a theory in Canadian constitutional law)	1938	Canada	The bill of rights implied by the Constitution Act, 1867, first identified in Reference Re Alberta Statutes in 1938.
Articles 13-28 of the Constitution of Italy	1947	Italy	
Saskatchewan Bill of Rights	1947	Canada: Saskatchewan	First bill of rights adopted in the British Empire / Commonwealth since the English Bill of Rights
Universal Declaration of Human Rights	1948	United Nations	
Fundamental rights and duties of citizens in People's Republic of China	1949	China	
Fundamental Rights of Indian citizens	1950	India	
European Convention on Human Rights	1953	Council of Europe	Drafted in 1950
Part II of the Constitution of Malaysia	1957	Malaya (until 1963) Malaysia (since 1963)	
Canadian Bill of Rights	1960	Canada	
Alberta Bill of Rights	1972	Canada: Alberta	
Part I of the Constitution of Portugal	1976	Portugal	
International Bill of Human Rights	1976	United Nations	
Quebec Charter of Human Rights and Freedoms	1976	Canada: Quebec	
Canadian Charter of Rights and Freedoms	1982	Canada	
Article III and XIII of the Constitution of the Philippines	1987	Philippines	The Bill of Rights encapsulating Article III regulates duties and responsibilities of the government toward the rights of citizens, while Article XIII is specifically about human rights and social justice
Article 5 of the Constitution of Brazil	1988	Brazil	
New Zealand Bill of Rights Act	1990	New Zealand	
Charter of Fundamental Rights and Basic Freedoms of the Czech Republic	1991	Czech Republic	
Hong Kong Bill of Rights Ordinance	1991	Hong Kong	
Chapter 2 of the Constitution of South Africa	1996	South Africa	Entitled "Bill of Rights"
Human Rights Act 1998	1998	United Kingdom	
Human Rights Act 2004	2004	Australia: Australian Capital Territory	
Charter of Fundamental Rights of the European Union	2005	European Union	
Charter of Human Rights and Responsibilities Act 2006	2006	Australia: Victoria	
Chapter Four of the Constitution of Zimbabwe	2013	Zimbabwe	
Human Rights Act 2019	2019	Australia: Queensland	

=== Specifically targeted documents ===
- Consumer Bill of Rights
- Homeless Bill of Rights
- Taxpayer Bill of Rights
- Academic Bill of Rights
- Veterans' Bill of Rights
- Second Bill of Rights, 1944 proposal by Franklin D. Roosevelt
- G.I. Bill of Rights, better known as the G.I. Bill
- Homosexual Bill of Rights, drafted by North American Conference of Homophile Organizations
- Library Bill of Rights, published by the American Library Association
- Environmental Bill of Rights or Agenda 21
- Creator's Bill of Rights, comic writers and artists
- Donor's Bill of Rights, for philanthropic donors
- Law Enforcement Officers' Bill of Rights
- California Voter Bill of Rights, adaptation of the Voting Rights Act
- Islamic Bill of Rights for Women in the Mosque
- New Jersey Anti-Bullying Bill of Rights Act
- Credit Cardholders' Bill of Rights, contained within the Credit CARD Act of 2009
- Sexual Assault Survivors' Bill of Rights (Sexual Assault Survivors' Rights Act)
- Bill of Rights for People of Mixed Heritage

== See also ==
- Inalienable rights
- International Bill of Human Rights
- International human rights instruments
- Natural rights
- Rule of law
- Second Bill of Rights
