= Horst Möller =

German contemporary historian (born 1943)

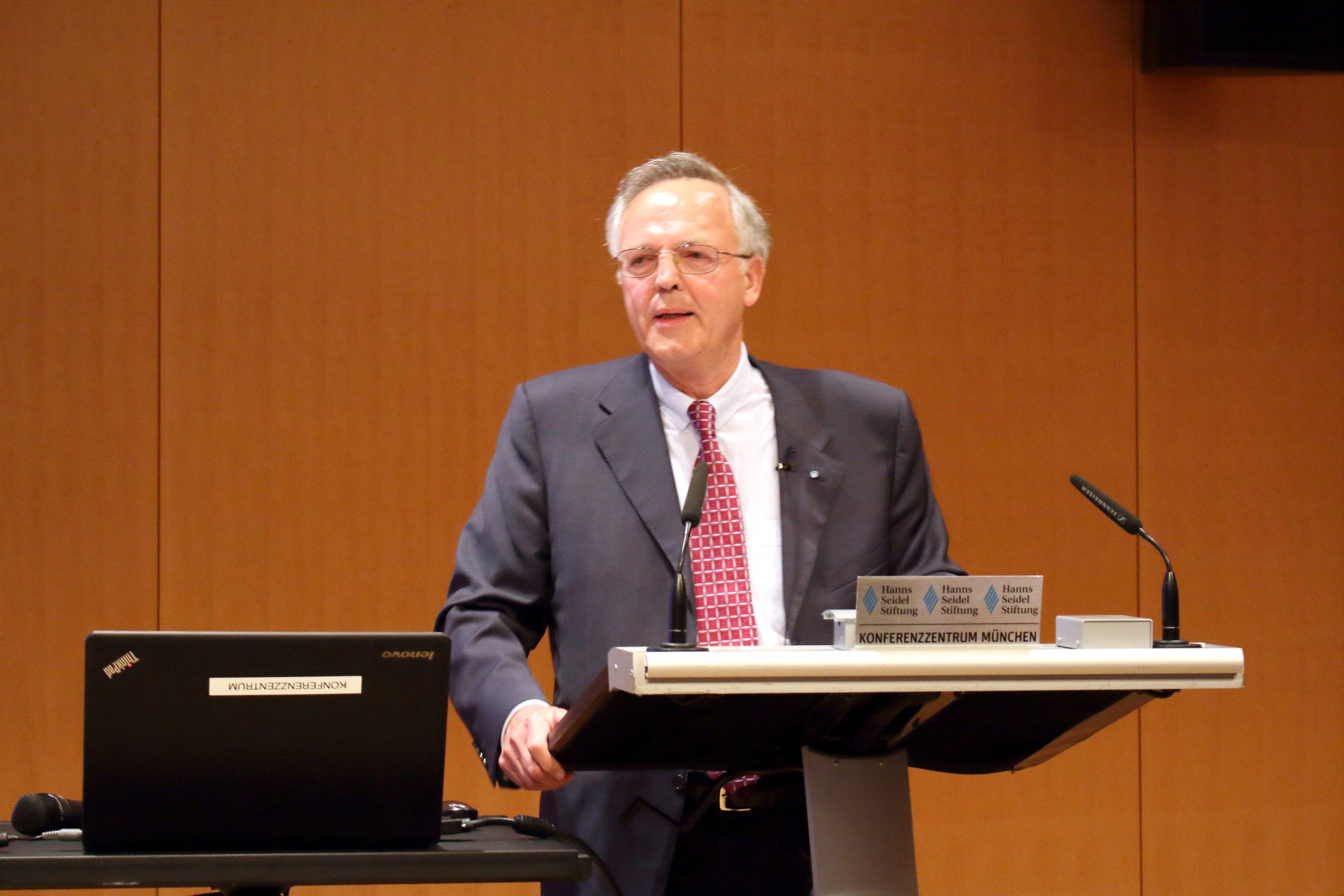
Möller in 2015

Horst Möller (born 12 January 1943 in Breslau) is a German contemporary historian. He is Professor of Modern History at LMU Munich and, from 1992 to 2011, Director of the Institut für Zeitgeschichte.

== Education and career ==
Möller was a student of history, philosophy and German studies at the University of Göttingen and the Free University of Berlin, and earned his doctorate in 1972. He was deputy director of the Institute of Contemporary History (Munich) from 1979 to 1982, and from 1982 to 1989 he was professor at the University of Erlangen-Nürnberg. He was director of the German Historical Institute Paris from 1989 to 1992.

He has been a visiting fellow at St Antony's College, Oxford (1986) and Sorbonne University (1988), visiting professor at Sciences Po in Paris (2002–2003). He is a member of the Historical Commission of the Bavarian Academy of Sciences.

== Honours ==
- 1987: Federal Cross of Merit
- 1994: Prix France-Allemagne
- 1995: Officer of the Ordre des Palmes Académiques
- 1996: Prix Lémonon of the Académie des sciences morales et politiques, Paris (Institut de France)
- 1998: Honorary doctorate at the University of Bordeaux
- 2006: Prix Gay-Lussac - Humboldt, awarded by the French Ministry of Research
- 2006: Honorary doctorate at the Institut d’études politiques de Paris (Fondation nationale des sciences politiques)
- 2006: Honorary doctorate at the University of Orléans
- 2007: Bavarian Order of Merit

== Publications ==
=== Monographs ===
- Aufklärung in Preußen. 1974
- Exodus der Kultur. Schriftsteller, Wissenschaftler und Künstler in der Emigration nach 1933. 1984, engl. 1983
- Parlamentarismus in Preußen 1919–1932. 1985
- Die Weimarer Republik. Eine unvollendete Demokratie. Dtv, 1985, ISBN 3-423-34059-2
- Vernunft und Kritik. Deutsche Aufklärung im 17. und 18. Jahrhundert. 1986
- Fürstenstaat oder Bürgernation? Deutschland 1763–1815. btb Verlag, o. Ort 1989, ISBN 3-442-75524-7
- Theodor Heuss. Staatsmann und Schriftsteller. 1990
- Europa zwischen den Weltkriegen. Oldenbourg, o. Ort 1998, ISBN 3-486-52321-X
- Der rote Holocaust und die Deutschen. Die Debatte um das 'Schwarzbuch des Kommunismus'. Piper Verlag. ISBN 978-3-492-04119-5.
- Wolfgang Neugebauer (ed.): Preußen von 1918 bis 1947: Weimarer Republik, Preußen und der Nationalsozialismus, in: Handbuch der preußischen Geschichte, Bd. 3, 2001
- with Hildegard Möller: Saint-Gobain in Deutschland. Von 1853 bis zur Gegenwart. Geschichte eines europäischen Unternehmens. 2001
- Andreas Wirsching (ed.): Aufklärung und Demokratie. Historische Studien zur politischen Vernunft. 2003

=== Co-author ===
- with Martin Broszat: Das Dritte Reich. Herrschaftsstruktur und Geschichte. C.H. Beck Verlag, 1983, ISBN 3-406-09280-2
- with Hannah Caplan, Egon Radvany, Dieter M. Schneider, Herbert A. Strauss (ed.), Werner Röder (Hrsg.): Biographisches Handbuch der deutschsprachigen Emigration nach 1933-1945. Band II. Kunst, Wissenschaft und Literatur. Saur KG, 1983, ISBN 3-598-10089-2
- with Udo Wengst: Einführung in die Zeitgeschichte. Beck, 2003, ISBN 3-406-50246-6

=== Editor ===
- Vierteljahrshefte für Zeitgeschichte and Schriftenreihe der VfZ (with K. D. Bracher and H.-P. Schwarz)
- with K. Hildebrand and G. Schöllgen: Akten zur Auswärtigen Politik der Bundesrepublik Deutschland.
- with G. Raulet and A. Wirsching: Gefährdete Mitte. Mittelschichten und politische Kultur zwischen den Weltkriegen: Italien, Frankreich und Deutschland. 1993
- with J. Morizet: Allemagne - France. Lieux de mémoire d'une histoire commune. Paris 1995
- with A. Wirsching and W. Ziegler: Nationalsozialismus in der Region. 1996
- with I. Mieck and J. Voss: Paris und Berlin in der Revolution 1848. 1995
- with Rainer Eppelmann, Dorothee Wilms und Günter Nooke: Lexikon des DDR-Sozialismus. 1996
- with K. Hildebrand: Die Bundesrepublik Deutschland und Frankreich. Dokumente 1949-1963. 1997/99 (4 Bde.)
- with Udo Wengst: 50 Jahre Institut für Zeitgeschichte: eine Bilanz. 1999
- with L. Gall et al.: Enzyklopädie deutscher Geschichte.
- Jahrbuch der historischen Forschung. 1982-2003
- Historische Bibliographie. 1987-2003
- with Eberhard Jäckel, Hermann Rudolph: Von Heuss bis Herzog. Die Bundespräsidenten im politischen System der Bundesrepublik. 1999
- with Volker Dahm, Hartmut Mehringer: Die tödliche Utopie. Bilder, Texte, Dokumente, Daten zum Dritten Reich. 2002
- with Manfred Kittel: Demokratie in Deutschland und Frankreich 1918–1933/40. Beiträge zu einem historischen Vergleich. 2002
- with Maurice Vaïsse: Willy Brandt und Frankreich. 2005
- with Manfred Kittel, Jirí Pešek, Oldrich Tuma: Deutschsprachige Minderheiten 1945. Ein europäischer Vergleich. 2006 (tschech. Ausgabe unter dem Titel: Nemecké menšiny v právnich normách 1938-1948. Ceskoslovensko ve srovnáni s vbybranými evropskými zememy)
- Les relations Franco-bavaroises. Textes réunis et publiés par Jacques Bariéty et Horst Möller, Revue d'Allemagne, tome 38 - no. 3, Juli - September 2006.
