= Eugen Ewig =

German historian

Eugen Ewig (May 18, 1913 – March 1, 2006) was a German historian who researched the history of the early Middle Ages. He taught as a professor of history at the University of Mainz and the University of Bonn. In the second half of the 20th century, he was considered the foremost expert on the Merovingian dynasty.

Since he was considered one of the few German medievalists after World War II who had not been influenced by Nazi ideology, he served as a mediator for the reconciliation process between Germany and France. In 1958, Ewig founded the German Historical Research Center in Paris, which became the German Historical Institute Paris in 1964.

== Life ==
=== Early life ===
Eugen Ewig was born in a Catholic home in Bonn, Germany, on May 18, 1913. He was the son of Fritz Ewig, a merchant who died in 1924, and his wife Eugenie Ewig. From 1919 to 1931, he attended the Beethoven High School in Bonn. His school years included events such as the occupation of the Rhineland, hyperinflation, and the Great Depression. Among his teachers were the philosopher Hermann Platz, who taught him French. It is widely believed that Ewig's later interest in Middle Francia and the Rhineland was due to Platz's influence. In 1931, Ewig passed the university entrance exam. After taking a summer course in Dijon, a stay in Paris significantly changed his attitude towards the country of France: "My world view, which had been shaped by the youth movement, was not completely displaced, but it was considerably corrected and put into perspective by the experience of the French metropolis." After that day, Ewig considered himself a Francophile.

=== Studies in Bonn (1931–1937 and 1938) ===
In Bonn, Ewig studied history, German, romance studies (French), and philosophy from 1931 to 1937. Among his fellow students were future historians Paul Egon Hübinger and Theodor Schieffer. Ewig was active in the Kartellverband, a German students union. During the first half of his undergraduate years, he majored in history and German studies. While he was initially taught primarily by Wilhelm Levison, he would later be taught by Ernst Robert Curtius. Curtius shaped Ewig's image of France and encouraged his research in that area.

Ewig received his doctorate in 1936. His thesis was on the theology of Denis the Carthusian, a late medieval theologian and mystic. Ewig took Denis' work, which in total comprises 41 volumes, and classified it in terms of intellectual history. It went against the prevailing spirit of the times. He wrote "Lightless and dim is the present, if one measures it by the standards of the past," which illustrates a pessimistic conservatism and is at odds with the ideology of strength that was being pushed by the Nazi Party. After Wilhelm Levison was forced out of the university in 1935 because of his Jewish origins, historian Max Braubach took over as Ewig's dissertation supervisor. Like many of his fellow students, Ewig maintained contact with Levison, who had emigrated to England.

After receiving his doctorate, friends of Ewig helped him spend three months in Paris. Upon his return, Ewig worked as an assistant lecturer at the Historical Seminar in Bonn for two years. In January 1938, he passed the state teaching examination and became qualified to teach history, German, and French. Due to the ever-dangerous political situation, however, he chose not to become a teacher. Instead, he worked as a bookkeeper for the University of Bonn's History Department.

=== Work as an archivist in Berlin, Breslau, and Metz ===
During the Nazi era, political attitudes played a major role in the career opportunities of young scientists. Ewig, as a student of Levison, as a political liberal, and as a Catholic with no ties to the Nazi Party, had no chance of becoming an academic. Following in the footsteps of Schieffer and Hübinger, other students of Levison, Ewig applied to the Institute for Archival Science and Advanced Training in History in Berlin. He was concerned that his activities as a member of the Catholic Youth League appeared suspicious to Nazi investigators. After a year of waiting, he was accepted to the Institute and began his archival training in April 1939. That same year, he wrote his first major scientific essay, "The Election of Elector Josef Clemens of Cologne as Prince-Bishop of Liège, 1694". It was published in the Annals of the Historical Society for the Lower Rhine, a journal which would later be banned by the Nazis in 1944. In 1940, Ewig completed his archival training.

Around this time, Ewig considered joining the Nazi Party to accelerate his appointment to civil service after graduation. He completed the paperwork but eventually chose to not submit it. There is no evidence to show that Ewig ever formally joined the Party. In 1941 he became a legal clerk in Breslau, and in March of that year was drafted into the Wehrmacht as a state archivist. A heart defect exempted him from military service.

Later in 1941, Ewig was transferred to the Lorraine State Archives in Metz at the behest of his superior. There he became the deputy director. In 1943, he wrote several articles, including "The Teutonic Knights' Commandery of Saarburg." Ewig used the libraries at the Erkelenz City Archives, the Vienna State Archives, and the Metz Archives for his research.

During the war, Ewig was a member of the Archive Protection Commission, which was established to return German archive material from France. He succeeded in preventing the transport of the archive holdings by feigning illness and subsequently hiding in the archive's basement. Ewig was on the blacklist of the Nazis, and the local party leader had orders to have him killed after the reconquest of Lorraine. He was accused, among other things, "of having caused the German occupation of the district to overstretch itself." On November 19, 1944, Ewig witnessed the American army liberate Metz. At the end of the war, he was jailed for a short time along with many other German citizens, but through the intervention of friends, he was released in early 1945.

=== Lecturer at the University of Nancy (1946-1949) ===
In 1946 he was hired as a lecturer at the University of Nancy in Lorraine, a position he held until 1949. Ewig was the first German historian to receive a lectureship at a French university after World War II. In this position, he communicated with the French military and government in order to establish reconciliation between the French and German peoples. In 1948, he was recognized for his efforts by the French politician Robert Schuman.

=== Mainz years (1946 - 1964) ===
In December 1945, Ewig was offered a job as Chair of Regional History at a Rhenish university that had yet to be founded. A few weeks after that job offer, the location for the university was set. It would be constructed in Mainz. Ewig became the first historian offered a position by the then-ruling French. In 1946, he was hired as the first professor at the University of Mainz, which was founded by the French occupying power. During the denazification process (carried out from 1947 to 1949), Ewig was the only historian classified as completely "unencumbered." The university, which was under French influence, also allowed Ewig to cultivate his relationships with friends from France. He exercised significant influence on appointments through his good relations with the ruling government. Over the first five years of its existence, the University of Mainz became a rallying point for Catholic historians, many of whom had worked at the University of Bonn before 1945.

At the beginning of his career in Mainz, Ewig led seminars on the regional history of the Lower Rhine and on historical auxiliary sciences. In 1948, he declined a position at Saarland University. In 1951, he married. In 1952, he became a lecturer at the University of Bonn and worked in both Mainz and Bonn. Also in 1952 he habilitated with the thesis "Trier in the Merovingian Empire. Civitas, City, and the Bishopric." This work has since become a classic in medieval studies.

After his habilitation, he became a full professor in Mainz in 1954. In Mainz, Ewig was mainly concerned with the political structure of Francia. The highlight of these studies was the "Description of Francia." In this descriptive analysis, Ewig devoted himself to the core regions of the Merovingian Frankish Empire, which consisted of Paris, the Île-de-France, Picardy, Champagne-Ardenne, and the areas around the Meuse, Moselle, and Rhine rivers. In 1955, Ewig became president of the Society for Middle Rhenish Church History, a position he held until 1965.

Alongside Max Braubach and Gerd Tellenbach, Ewig founded the "Scientific Commission for Research on the History of Franco-German Relations" in 1957, with the aim of "promoting scientific work in the field of medieval and modern history in France and establishing or deepening contacts between German and French historians." Ewig became executive director of the commission. In 1960, he was made Dean of the Faculty of Philosophy at the University of Mainz. That same year, he became a member of the Historical Commission for Hesse and a member of the German Archaeological Institute. Also in 1960, he was a founding member of the Constance Working Group for Medieval History, which is still considered the most important forum for German-language medieval studies. In Mainz, he supervised two doctoral dissertations.

=== Final years ===
Ewig was still publishing at an advanced age and continued to support the German Historical Institute in Paris. On his 75th birthday, a scientific colloquium was organized in his honor. After his 90th birthday, he participated in the preparations for the 50th anniversary of the founding of the institute. For his efforts to strike a balance between France and Germany, he was named "hereditary friend" by the Allgemeine Zeitung. Only a few days before his death, he completed the manuscript of a paper on the relations of the Franks to the Roman Empire from the 3rd to the 5th century. The essay was published posthumously in the Rhenish Quarterly.

== Work ==
Ewig's extensive scholarly body of work was created in the period from 1936 to 2006 and includes more than 100 titles. His writings were evenly split between French and German. The central theme of his research was the transformation process of the Frankish Empire from late antiquity, through the Merovingian period, to the Carolingian Empire. Ewig became known as a specialist in this field. Other focuses of his included the Christian foundations of kingship and emperorship and the parallels between state doctrine and church doctrine.

Ewig wrote his first research contributions on the late Middle Ages and early modern period. After the Second World War, however, he concentrated on the early Middle Ages and the Frankish Empire. This was fueled, at least in part, by a desire to deconstruct the myth of a historical Franco-German antagonism. Ewig hoped that his research would work out the common roots of German and French history. The efforts for European unification after World War II served as a starting point. Ewig justified his reorientation by saying: "The choice was determined by the desire to work out the foundations of European unity, to help shape a new image of history, and thereby also to participate in shaping the future."

The German Historical Institute in Paris honored him by publishing his collected writings in two volumes, under the supervision of Hartmut Atsma. The first volume, on Late Antiquity and Frankish Gaul, was published in 1976. It includes works on political history, the after-effects of Roman institutions, the influence of Constantine the Great on posterity, the Christian idea of kingship, folklore and popular consciousness in the 7th century, the political structure of Gaul, and the Frankish divisions of empire from 511 to 714 CE. The second volume, published in 1979, contains studies on church history. A third volume, collecting his writings from 1974 to 2007, was published in 2007 by historians from the University of Bonn. In addition to the history of Francia, this volume included works on the early Rhenish period.

=== Merovingian Research ===
Even before the publication of Ewig's habilitation, he had published two extensive studies on the divisions of the Merovingian Frankish empire and the resulting sub-kingdoms of the 6th and 7th centuries. Together with his subsequent works in the area, they offer an analysis of the basic structures of the Frankish empire and the royal conflicts during this period. Ewig had thus provided both a structuralist framework for understanding the period alongside an overview of political events that has since served as a substitute for the missing annals of the Frankish Empire. As early as 1955, he succeeded in showing that Roman institutions survived on a large scale in the Merovingian period. In numerous works he devoted himself to folklore and the problem of popular consciousness in the Frankish Empire, as well as to Christian kingship in the early Middle Ages. In other studies he examined the Merovingian dynasty. In 1988, his work culminated with the survey work "The Merovingians and the Frankish Empire." This book became the standard work in the field.

=== The Rhineland as a Central Region ===
For Ewig, the Rhineland formed a central region for Europe, both politically and culturally. The importance he attributed to the Rhineland is evidenced in the introductory chapter of his dissertation: "Never have the great memories of their universal leadership position in Europe diminished in the landscapes of the Rhine since they have been overshadowed by the great powers from West and East." His habilitation thesis focused on the role of the Moselle metropolis of Trier and the problem of political, social, economic, ecclesiastical, and cultural continuity across eons. To this end, Ewig examined the position of the bishop in the city and in the diocese, the ownership structure of the episcopal church, and the history of settlement and language. Two aspects are characteristic for Ewig's work on the Rhineland and Moselle. First, he exceeded the typical time horizon for medievalists by considering the period from late antiquity to the Carolingians as a whole. Second, he discussed the physical landscape of the region, which allowed him to grasp the scope and boundaries of large political areas more precisely.

Ewig's assessment of the historical significance of the Rhineland heavily affected his political views. After World War II, he was among the chief advocates for an independent Rhineland state. He criticized the Centre Party for having opposed Rhineland autonomy after World War I. In 1950, he published "Landscape and Tribe in German History," in which he formulated a Rhenish "heartland theory." Ewig saw Germany's center in the Rhineland and pleaded for a historiographical westward shift of the Prussia-heavy image of Germany. "It is no coincidence that the center of gravity of our life has moved back to the Rhine precisely at a time when we are striving for European unity. This is an important prerequisite for the mission of Rhenish Germany." Consequently, as a strict Rhinelander, Ewig returned the Federal Cross of Merit I Class, which he had been awarded in 1985, in 1991, when Berlin became the capital of Germany.
