= Karl Ferdinand Werner =

German historian (1924-2008)

Karl Ferdinand Werner (Neunkirchen, Saarland 1924 – Tegernsee 2008) was a German historian. He particularly studied historiography, the Early Middle Ages and the origins of European nobility.

== Works ==
- Die Entstehung des Reditus regni Francorum ad stirpem Karoli, Diss. 1950.
- Aufstieg der westlichen Nationalstaaten, in: Historia Mundi, VI, 1958
- Untersuchungen zur Frühzeit des französischen Fürstentums, 8-10 Jahrhundert, 1960
- Das NS-Geschichtsbild und die deutsche Geschichtswissenschaft, 1967
- Die Nachkommen Karls des Grossen bis um das Jahr 1000, in: Karls des Großen Lebenswerk und Nachleben, IV, hrsg. v. W. Braunfels, 1967
- Das Frankenreich 486-911 (carte murale)., 1967, 1972
- Structures politiques du monde franc (VIe-XIIe siècles). Études sur les origines de la France et de l'Allemagne, 1979
- Les Origines (avant l'an Mil) (vol. 1 de l'Histoire de France, sous la direction de Jean Favier), 1984-1988
- Hludovicus Augustus. Gouverner l'empire chrétien, idées et réalités, 1990
- Volk, Nation. Geschichtliche Grundbegriffe, VII., 1992
- Il y a mille ans, les Carolingiens. Fin d'une dynastie, début d'un mythe, in: Annuaire-Bulletin de la Société de l'Histoire de France, 1993
- Marc Bloch und die Anfänge einer europäischen Geschichtsforschung, 1994
- Karl der Große oder Charlemagne?, in: Sitzungsberichte der Bayerischen Akademie der Wissenschaften, 1995
- Die Ursprünge Frankreichs bis zum Jahr 1000. Deutscher Taschenbuch Verlag München 1995
- La Conquête franque de la Gaule. Itinéraires historiographiques d’une erreur, in: Bibliothèque de l’École des chartes, 1996
- Politik und kirchliche Konflikte in Lotharingien und Burgund im Spiegel des lat. Tierepos (10.-11. Jh.), in: Rheinische Vierteljahrsblätter, 1997
- Völker und Regna (Beiheft HZ), 1997
- Les premiers Robertiens et les premiers Anjous (IXe s.-Xe s.), in: Mémoires de la Société des Antiquaires de l’Ouest, 1997
- Naissance de la noblesse. L’essor des élites politiques en Europe, Fayard, Paris, 1998, ISBN 2-213-02148-1.
