= Barbara Mittler =

German sinologist

Barbara Mittler (born 15 February 1968 in Hagen, West Germany) is a German sinologist. She is co-director of the Cluster of Excellence "Asia and Europe in a Global Context".

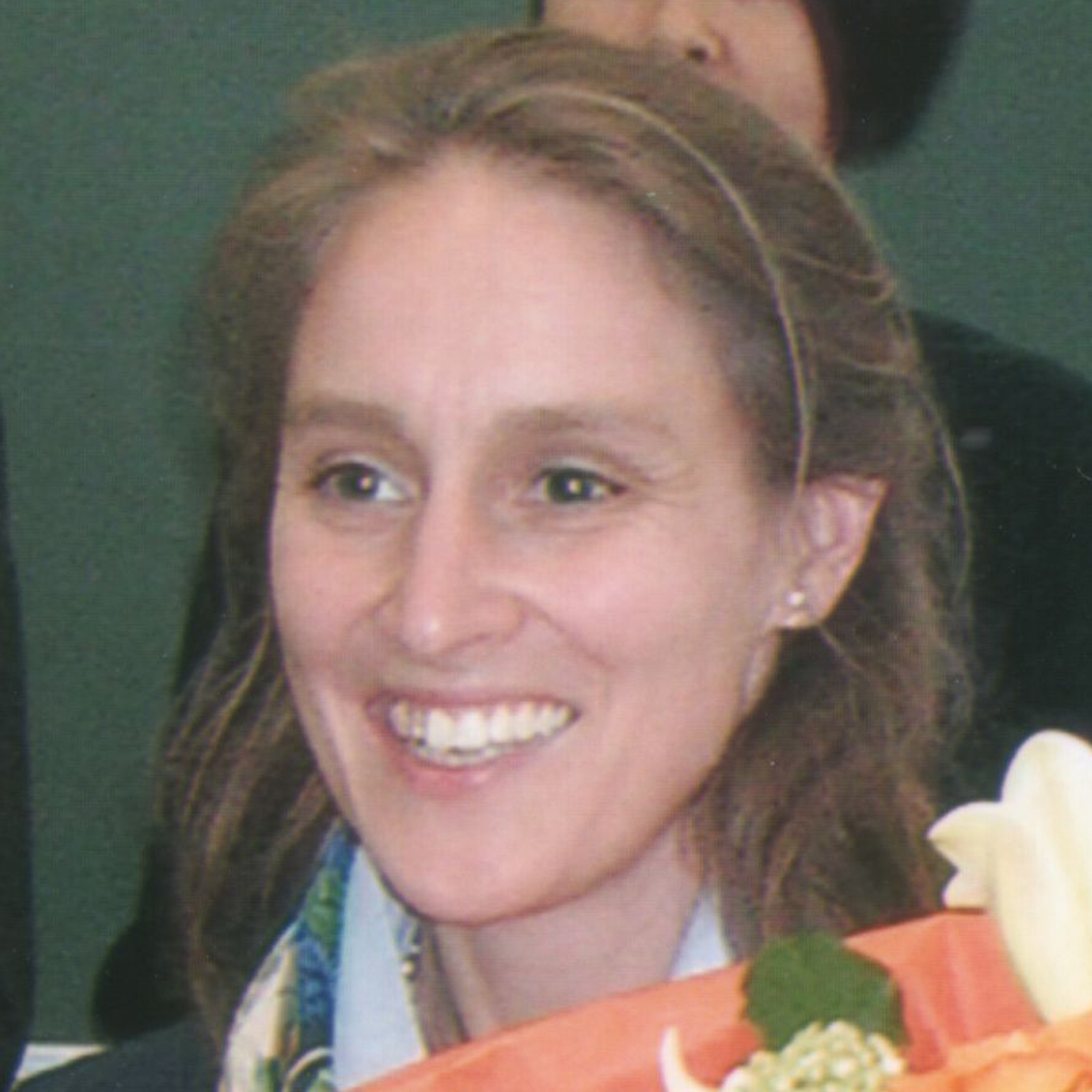
Barbara Mittler

== Early life and education ==
Barbara Mittler was born 15 February 1968, in Hagen, West Germany. She is the daughter of flautist Uta Mittler and librarian Elmar Mittler. Mittler received her B.A. and M.A. from Oxford and her Ph.D. from Heidelberg University. She also studied Chinese at the Mandarin Training Center in Taiwan.

== Career and research ==
After her dissertation in 1994, Mittler worked as an assistant professor at Heidelberg University, where she was habilitated in 1998. She continued as an associate professor. In 2004, she became full professor at the Institute of Chinese Studies, which she managed as director until autumn 2012. At the Cluster of Excellence “Asia and Europe in a Global Context”, Mittler became speaker of the research area “Public Spheres” in 2007. Since November 2012, she is the Cluster's co-director. Barbara Mittler is a member of the German Academy of Sciences LEOPOLDINA.

In 2000, Mittler was awarded the Heinz-Maier-Leibnitz-Prize of the German Research Foundation and the Federal Ministry of Education and Research for her outstanding research. Between 2002 and 2004, she held the Heisenberg Fellowship awarded by the German Research Foundation. In 2009, Mittler received the Henry Allen Moe Prize of the American Philosophical Society for her paper Popular Propaganda? Art and Culture in Revolutionary China. In this paper, Mittler addresses the question why the items of propaganda of Mao Zedong's time, a tragic period of suffering, are now popular in China, and why Mao has become a mythical figure.

Mittler's former desire to become a practicing musician (she plays the piano and the violin) led her to explore Chinese avant-garde music and fueled her passion for Chinese culture. Her research focuses on a wide range of topics such as Chinese music, Taiwanese literary and cultural history, encyclopedias and comics, Chinese women's magazines, visuality and historiography, satire and national heroes.

== Personal life ==
She is married to the classical philologist Thomas A. Schmitz.

== Selected works ==
- Dangerous Tunes: The Politics of Chinese Music in Hong Kong, Taiwan and the People’s Republic of China since 1949. Wiesbaden: Harrassowitz (Opera sinologica 3), 1997.
- A Newspaper for China? Power, Identity and Change in Shanghai’s News Media (1872-1912). Cambridge: Harvard University Asia Center (distributed by Harvard University Press) (Harvard East Asian Monographs Series 226), 2004.
- A Continuous Revolution: Making Sense of Cultural Revolution Culture. Cambridge: Harvard University Asia Center (distributed by Harvard University Press) (Harvard East Asian Monographs Series 343), 2012.
