= Heidelberg Research Architecture =

The Heidelberg Research Architecture (HRA) is the Digital Humanities unit of the Cluster of Excellence "Asia and Europe in a Global Context" at Heidelberg University. It embraces digital resource development, project consultation and trainings for researchers and students. The HRA’s specialists work with researchers and students at the Cluster to form an integrated digital humanities environment for transcultural studies. Its agenda ranges from developing the Tamboti ecosystem that allows transcultural relations to be traced and analysed across diverse media types (texts, images, films, audio) and disparate objects (texts, concepts, social networks), to offering hands-on workshops on digital humanities tools for researchers working at the Cluster and Heidelberg University. Furthermore, digital resources and their production are increasingly integrated into teaching environments. The HRA provides advice to researchers on how to conceptualize and implement digital resources to structure their research. As a cooperation partner at local, national, and international level the HRA works together with partners from the public as well as the private sector.

== The Tamboti ecosystem ==
At the core of the HRA’s work is the development of the Tamboti ecosystem.

Tamboti is modular, and currently (November 2014) features these modules:

- MODS editor
- Ziziphus VRA Core 4 editor
- Atomic Wiki

Tamboti serves as central access point to data from several different collections, where users can store and share, but also edit and comment on it. The ecosystem facilitates research collaboration and academic exchange in the field of Digital Humanities. Tamboti contains multilingual bibliographical information on books and articles as well as research based metadata on image collections, videos and various forms of digital material. It is possible to search the different types of sources and establish semantically qualified relations between them. Tamboti's modular design makes it flexible to use and adopt for research. On the back-end Tamboti makes use of eXist-db. Data is stored in XML using international metadata schema, like MODS, MADS, VRA Core 4, or TEI which allows for both, interchangeability and sustainability of the knowledge. Tamboti is open source software. International metadata standards and terminologies are used to ensure sustainability.
