= Bill of Rights Bill =

Proposed UK human rights legislation

Parliament of the United Kingdom
- Long title: A Bill to reform the law relating to human rights.
- Citation: Bill of Rights Bill
- Considered by: Parliament of the United Kingdom

Legislative history
- Introduced by: Dominic Raab
- First reading: 22 June 2022

Repeals
- Human Rights Act 1998

Summary
- Replaces the Human Rights Act 1998; removes the obligation of UK Courts to follow ECHR case law; places stringent limits on the Courts' power to enforce positive obligations and to prevent the deportation of illegal immigrants
- Status: Not passed

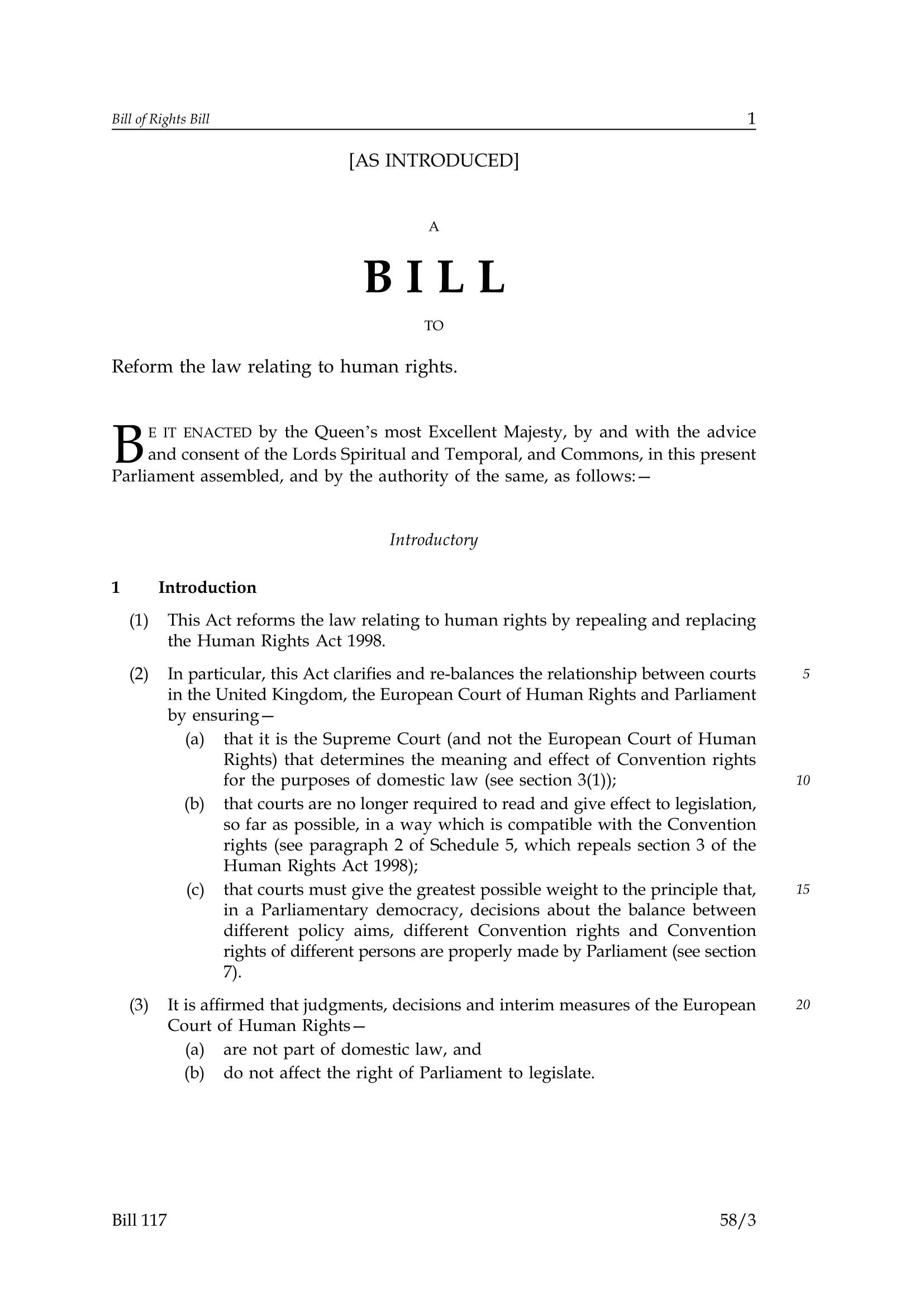
The front page of the proposed Bill of Rights Bill

The Bill of Rights Bill was a proposed Act of Parliament in the United Kingdom that sought to replace the Human Rights Act 1998. It was introduced to the House of Commons by Dominic Raab, the Deputy Prime Minister of the United Kingdom and Secretary of State for Justice, on 22 June 2022.

On 7 September 2022, the passage of the Bill through Parliament was halted by the newly appointed Prime Minister, Liz Truss. On 27 June 2023, the Justice Secretary Alex Chalk confirmed to the Commons that the government would not be proceeding with the Bill.

== Background ==
Prior to the 2010 general election, David Cameron proposed replacing the Human Rights Act with a new "British Bill of Rights". After forming a coalition with the Liberal Democrats, these plans were shelved and reinstated only after the Conservative party won an overall majority in the 2015 general election. Former Prime Minister David Cameron then vowed to put right what he termed the "complete mess" of Britain's human rights laws, on the 800th anniversary of the passage of Magna Carta. Tensions arose between those on the political right in the UK, and the European Court of Human Rights, over issues such as prisoner voting.

=== Proposed British Bill of Rights ===
The Proposed British Bill of Rights was a proposal of the Second Cameron ministry, included in their 2015 election manifesto, to replace the Human Rights Act 1998 with a new piece of primary legislation. After resistance from within the governing Conservative party, leader David Cameron delayed introducing the legislation.

=== 2020 ===
In 2020, the UK Government set up an independent review of the Human Rights Act which specifically sought evidence on the operation of the Act, with particular attention to the relationship between domestic courts and the European Court of Human Rights (ECHR), as well as the relationship between government, parliament and the judiciary. The independent review reported their findings in December 2021.

In the Queen's Speech in May 2022, the Government committed to introducing the new Bill of Rights, arguing that the legislation would seek to "end the abuse of the human rights framework and restore some common sense to our justice system.”

On 15 June 2022, the week before the Bill was introduced to Parliament, the Strasbourg Court issued an interim order stopping a flight due to transport asylum seekers from the UK as part of the Rwanda asylum plan. It was reported that the decision of the Strasbourg Court was a factor in determining the introduction of the Bill.

In the UK Government announcement for the Bill, Dominic Raab argued that the proposed law would "strengthen our UK tradition of freedom whilst injecting a healthy dose of common sense into the system" and it would also "reinforce freedom of speech, enable us to deport more foreign offenders and better protect the public from dangerous criminals".

On the day the Bill was introduced, the first page of the Bill was leaked to legal journalist Joshua Rozenberg.

=== Independent Review of the Human Rights Act ===
Prior to introducing the Bill of Rights, the Lord Chancellor established an Independent Review of the Human Rights Act, chaired by Sir Peter Gross.

After hearing evidence, the independent review concluded that “there is no case for changing the Human Rights Act.”

The review did recommend the government implement a course of action to improve understanding and bolster the effectiveness of the HRA 1998. In summary, the review recommended:

- To implement a programme of education around the role and operation of the Human Rights Act.
- To place common law rights and precedent at the front and centre of human rights law.
- Increase transparency about the use of section 3 interpretations by the courts.
- Alter the law to enable suspended quashing orders.
- Ensure that Henry VIII clause cannot be used to alter the Act itself.

== Passage through Parliament ==
The Bill was halted on 7 September 2022 before its second reading; at the time there was no plan to return it to Parliament. After the reinstatement of Dominic Raab as Lord Chancellor as part of Rishi Sunak’s first cabinet, it was suggested the Bill would return to Parliament. Alex Chalk in his role as Lord Chancellor confirmed as of 27 June 2023 that the Bill would not proceed any further.

Illustration of the Passage of a Bill through Parliament

The Government had not published the details of the changes until the Bill was introduced into Parliament by the Lord Chancellor, Dominic Raab. During his introductory statement, the Lord Chancellor was censured by the Speaker, Lindsay Hoyle, for having inappropriately provided information to the press before making his statement in Parliament. The Speaker commented: 'yet again the media have been the first to know. I'm glad that the minister is making the statement, but he should have done that before speaking to the media.

The Johnson Government did not undertake any public or Parliamentary scrutiny of the Bill before its presentation. This can be compared to the introduction of the Human Rights Act, which was preceded by a consultation paper, public and specialist scrutiny, and gained Labour and Liberal Democrat support before introduction to the House. The Joint Committee on Human Rights chair wrote a letter to Dominic Raab, criticising the Government's failure to engage properly with the Independent Review, the Joint Committee's own work and the consultation responses to the Government's own consultation; according to the letter from the Joint Committee the Government had not made out the case for replacing the Human Rights Act.

The Conservative Manifesto of 2019 set out an intention to 'update' the Human Rights Act 1998, but the Bill proposed significant reform to the operation of fundamental rights in the UK and would have repealed the Human Rights Act itself.

On 25 January 2023, the Joint Committee on Human Rights released a legislative scrutiny report on the Bill of Rights which concluded there was no case for the Bill. The Committee found ‘the Bill of Rights Bill not only lacks support, but has caused overwhelming and widespread concern … we do not think this is a Bill of Rights at all, and recommend that the title of the Bill is changed accordingly. In any case, the Government should not proceed with this Bill: it weakens rights protections, it undermines the universality of rights, it shows disregard for our international legal obligations.’

On 27 June 2023, the Justice Secretary Alex Chalk confirmed to MPs that the government would not be proceeding with the Bill.

=== Criticism of Parliamentary handling ===
The Government faced criticism from leading lawyers and academics about side-lining parliamentary and public scrutiny, in the process of creating and introducing the Bill.

Merris Amos, Professor of Human Rights Law at Queen Mary, University of London commented that 'For other democracies, the process to change such an important feature of the constitution would likely take years, and would involve constitutional conventions, public consultation, a referendum or special parliamentary majorities. With the government’s current majority, the Human Rights Act could be repealed in less than a year.' The Government did undertake a public consultation on Human Rights Act Reform in 2021 though Professor Amos criticises the clarity of the consultation: 'Even for experts, the 118-page consultation is difficult to understand and full of conclusions not based in evidence.'

Daniella Lock, Postdoctoral Fellow at the Bonavero Institute of Human Rights in the Faculty of Law, University of Oxford, criticised the absence of parliamentary scrutiny measures before the Bill was introduced. She argues: 'the fact that the Government has chosen not to enable any pre-legislative scrutiny of the Bill of Rights Bill is undermining of Parliament for two key reasons. First, it is a scrutiny procedure often afforded to much less radical legislation...Second, pre-legislative scrutiny of the Bill had been explicitly requested by a number of Parliamentary committees.'

On 27 May 2022, the Joint Committee on Human Rights (JCHR), the Justice Committee, the Lords Constitution Committee and the Public Administration and Constitutional Affairs Committee sent a joint letter to the Government requesting pre-legislative scrutiny. Liberty also issued a letter jointly signed by 150 civil society groups seeking pre-legislative scrutiny. Lock further criticises the 'significant discordance' between the Government's presentation of the Bill and its actual content, accusing the Government of 'taking Parliament for a fool.'

== Provisions ==
The Bill seeks to repeal the Human Rights Act 1998 (HRA 1998) and replace it with a new regime contained in the Bill. The United Kingdom remains a signatory to the European Convention on Human Rights (ECHR) and so is bound to meet the requirements of the Convention in international law. Internationally, the European Court of Human Rights (ECHR) remains the premier court for Convention decisions. Strasbourg decisions will remain binding over the U.K. in international law. The original text of the draft law, introduced in 2022, stated that, once enacted, this bill could have been cited as the "Bill of Rights 2022". This would have made it one of the very few Acts of the British Parliament which do not contain the word "Act" in its short title.

=== Clause 2 - Convention rights ===
Clause 2 of the Bill retains the same set of Convention rights which are currently provided for by the HRA. However, some of the subsequent clauses in the Bill would allow for narrower readings of these rights and greater departure from the case law of the ECHR. So, while the same rights would operate in the UK as under the current regime, there may be a practical difference in how they are applied.

=== Clause 3 - Interpretation of Convention rights ===
Clause 3 provides that the Supreme Court is the 'ultimate judicial authority on questions arising under domestic law in connection with the Convention rights'. It also replaces section 2 HRA 1998 - which requires domestic courts to take account of Strasbourg case law. Instead clause 3 provides that courts must have particular regard to the text of the ECHR and may have regard to the preparatory work of the ECHR (the travaux preparatoires). Courts may also have regard to the development under the common law of any right similar to the Convention right.

The Bill requires the courts to act in accordance with clauses 4-8 of the Bill.

=== Clause 4 - Free speech ===
Clause 4 (Freedom of Speech) requires that the courts must 'give great weight' to freedom of speech. The Bill makes explicit that free speech is the same as ECHR Article 10 (Freedom of Expression). However the scope of Article 10 of the ECHR is wider than just free speech- it protects freedom of expression and not only the use of speech, writing and images. Clause 4 also includes multiple exceptions to the proposed special protection for free speech: it would not apply to cases involving criminal matters, breach of confidence, immigration or citizenship, or national security.

=== Clause 5 - Positive obligations ===
Clause 5 prohibits the court from interpreting Convention rights in a way which places a new positive obligation (an obligation to act) on a public body. This applies from any time after the commencement of the Bill as law. Clause 5 also requires courts to give great weight to certain public interests when considering requiring public authorities to respect an existing positive obligation.

=== Clauses 6, 8 and 20 - Deportation and custody ===
Clauses 6 and 8 relate to people in custody or being deported. Under clause 6, the court would have to 'give the greatest possible weight to the importance of reducing the risk to the public from persons who have committed offences in respect of which custodial sentences have been imposed' when deciding on whether there has been a breach of Convention rights. This does not apply where the alleged breach is related to any of the following Articles: Article 2 (Right to Life); Article 3 (Prohibition of Torture); Article 4(1) (Prohibition of Slavery); Article 7 (No Punishment Without Law). Clause 8 requires that if courts are making an assessment of a breach to Article 8 (Private and Family Life) in a deportation case, they may only find there has been a breach where there is 'manifest harm to a qualifying member of [the potential deportee's] family that is so extreme that the harm would override the otherwise paramount public interest in removing [the person] from or requiring [the person] to leave the United Kingdom.' It is also only in the most 'compelling circumstances' that extreme harm can be found to affect a family member other than a qualifying child or that the public interest favours not deporting the person. Clause 20 would limit the court's power to make orders based on a breach of the Article 6 (Right to Fair Trial), requiring the court can only allow an appeal against deportation on this ground where not doing so 'would result in a breach of the right to a fair trial so fundamental as to amount to a nullification of that right.'

=== Clause 9 - Jury trial ===
Clause 9 of the Bill enshrines the right to jury trial as part of Article 6 (Right to Fair Trial) within the United Kingdom, subject to the exceptions: (a) where the person pleads guilty; (b) where the person chooses to be tried without a jury; (c) where the offence is prescribed by law as insufficiently serious to be required to be tried before a jury; (d) where it is otherwise prescribed by law that the person should be tried without a jury.

=== Clauses 7 and 10 - Deference to Parliament ===
Clause 7 emphasises the deference courts should give to Parliament when they make assessments of incompatibility between a piece of legislation and a Convention right. The Bill retains the current power in s4 HRA 1998 to declare legislation incompatible in Clause 10 but seeks to enhance the weight of Parliamentary decision making in the minds of judges; Clause 7 requires that judges treat Parliament as having decided that the statute strikes the appropriate balance between competing rights and 'give the greatest possible weight to the principle that, in a Parliamentary democracy, decisions about how such a balance should be struck are properly made by Parliament’.

=== Clause 12, 17 and 18 - Public bodies ===
Clause 12 establishes the obligation on public bodies, including the Government itself, to abide by Convention rights. In this way it replicates the same requirement in s6 HRA 1998, however this would apply in the narrower sense of interpretation of rights allowed to the courts by earlier clauses. This clause would need to be read in light of Clause 5. Clause 17 allows for the court to grant 'such remedy as it considers just and appropriate' where there is a relevant breach of rights by a public body under clause 12 and Clause 18 allows for damages to be awarded for a breach.

=== Clause 15 - Permission stage ===
Clause 15 introduces a new permission stage for anyone seeking to bring an action under the Bill of Rights. This includes a new requirement that anyone bringing an action has suffered (or would suffer) a significant disadvantage because of the breach of a Convention right. This provision mirrors the admissibility criterion in Article 34 ECHR. However, clause 15 is more restrictive allowing for the permission requirement to be disregarded only for 'reasons of wholly exceptional public interest' and being read in conjunction with clause 3, means that the Strasbourg case law is unlikely to be taken into account to moderate the restriction. In contrast Article 34 ECHR provides the permission requirement does not apply where 'respect for human rights' requires the case to be examined and Strasbourg case law also develops certain guidelines, for instance the 'significant disadvantage' clause in Article 34 will be unlikely to rule out proceedings in relation to the right to life or freedom from torture.

=== Clause 24 - Interim measures ===
Clause 24 provides that UK courts can have no regard to any interim measures ordered by the European Court of Human Rights.

== Reception ==
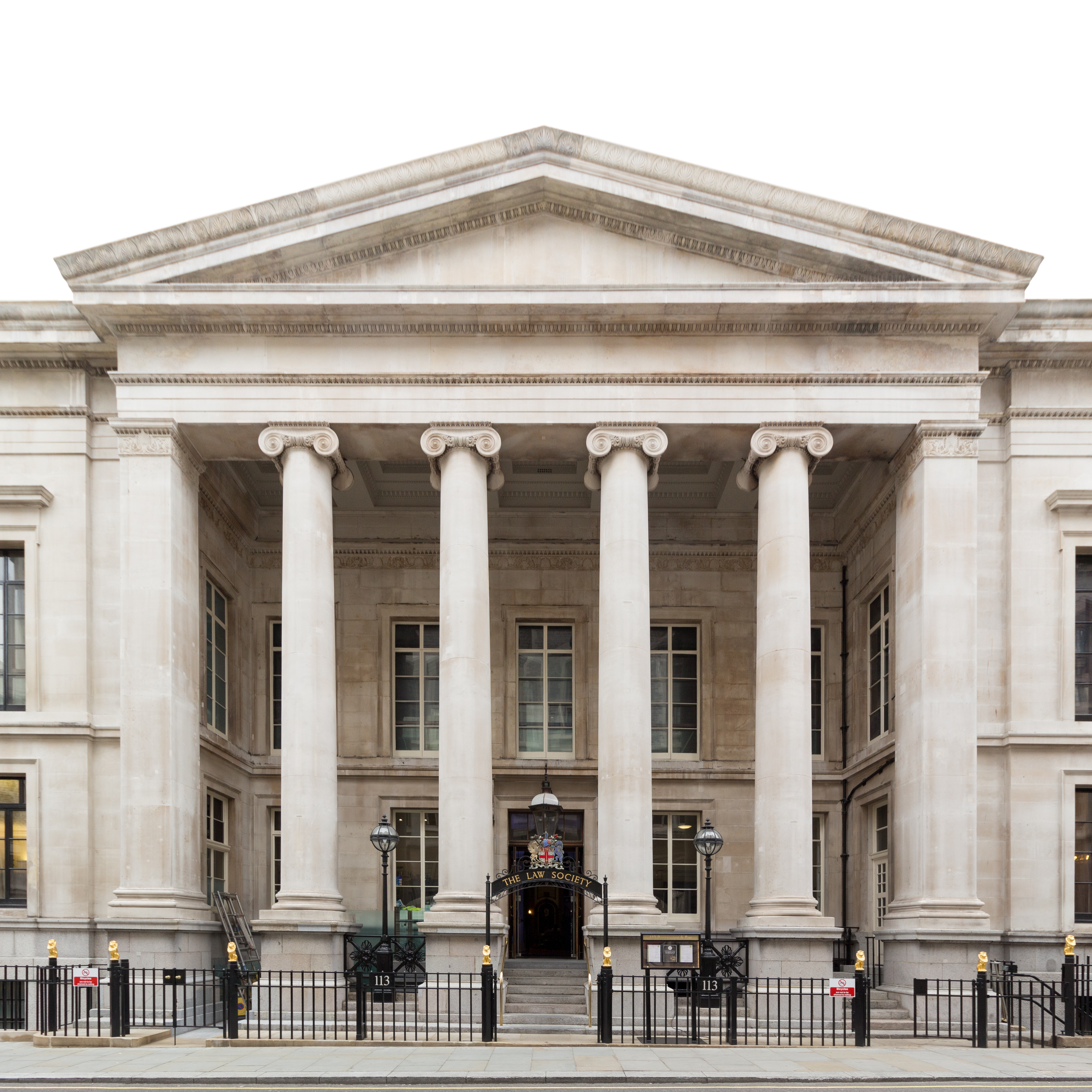
Law Society, Chancery Lane, London

The Bill has faced criticism from some in the legal profession including the Law Society of England and Wales, and the Law Society of Scotland. It has also been opposed by Amnesty International, Liberty, JUSTICE, and the Labour Party have expressed concerns that the Bill would have stopped victims of terrorist attacks as well as the Hillsborough disaster from seeking justice.

Mark Elliott, professor of public law at the University of Cambridge, argued that the Bill is "a piece of legislation that the Government claims enhances human rights protection but which in fact significantly diminishes it" and that it "smacks of authoritarian resistance to scrutiny and is antithetical to the best traditions of the British constitution". Lawyer and legal commentator David Allen Green argued that the legislation seeks to "make it harder practically for convention rights to be enforced", and that such a purpose is ill-fitting for a 'Bill of Rights'. Alice Donald (Associate Professor, Middlesex University) has published a guide to the Bill in which she argues the Bill may harm protections for 'people whose rights are most vulnerable to abuse (such as children, victims of sexual violence and people seeking asylum). Professor Rory O'Connell (Transitional Justice Institute) supports the view that the proposals risk denying protection to victims of crime, domestic violence, child neglect, child abuse, and human trafficking in a briefing note on positive obligations for the Committee on the Administration of Justice.

In June 2022 the think tank Policy Exchange released a paper authored by Professor Richard Ekins criticising the continued pursuit of a Bill of Rights in the UK on the grounds that it may compound problems that Professor Ekins argues are already created by the operation of the Human Rights Act 1998. Writing before the Bill was reintroduced by Dominic Raab, Professor Ekins – again for Policy Exchange – suggested: ‘The Bill of Rights Bill … was, thus far, to be welcomed. However, it also risked introducing some other problems, notably imprecision in relation to the rights that Parliament intended to be protected and the extent to which it would open to domestic judges to decide this for themselves.’ Professor Ekins instead favours a return to common law rights by repeal of the HRA 1998 or significant amendment. Yuan Yi Zhu, Senior Research Fellow at Policy Exchange, commented that the Bill would not reverse the expansion of judicial power in the UK, but may instead lead to the impression that human rights have been 'domesticated' when the UK would still be bound by the ECHR.

=== Impact on the Good Friday Agreement ===
The Good Friday Agreement requires that the United Kingdom remain a signatory to the ECHR. It is a bilateral treaty between the United Kingdom and Ireland that is binding in international law and remains integral to the peace and stability of the island of Ireland.

Section 5(b) of Strand One of the Agreement requires that ‘[t]here will be safeguards to ensure that all sections of the community can participate and work together successfully in the operation of these institutions and that all sections of the community are protected, including…the European Convention on Human Rights (ECHR) and any Bill of Rights for Northern Ireland supplementing it, which neither the Assembly nor public bodies can infringe, together with a Human Rights Commission.’

Section 2 of ‘Rights, Safeguards and Equality of Opportunity’ requires that: ‘The British Government will complete incorporation into Northern Ireland law of the European Convention on Human Rights (ECHR), with direct access to the courts, and remedies for breach of the Convention, including power for the courts to overrule Assembly legislation on grounds of inconsistency.’.

Aoife O’Donoghue (Professor at Queen's University Belfast) and Colin Murray (Reader in Public Law at Newcastle University) consider that ‘ECHR-incorporation on the HRA model was a floor, and absolutely not a ceiling for rights protections’ and suggest that the Bill of Rights Bill risks incompatibility with the Good Friday Agreement despite retaining the substantive ECHR rights present in the Human Rights Act 1998. This is primarily due to the risks they perceive in clauses 12 and 13 of the Bill. O’Donoghue and Murray suggest that the ability, provided for in clause 12(2), for public agencies to operate in breach of convention rights - including where this is set out in statutory instruments (which includes Northern Ireland Assembly legislation) - could be contrary to the Good Friday Agreement. The Assembly is prevented by the Agreement and Northern Ireland Act 1998 from legislating contrary to the ECHR. As such this clause may breach the limitation on Stormont. They note that the limits on certain claims created by Clause 13 of the Bill may also undercut the requirements of the Good Friday Agreement - particularly because it is not clear whether this clause would diminish or remove the authority of the Northern Ireland Human Rights Commission. Under s71 Northern Ireland Act 1998 the Commission can begin proceedings without meeting the victim status requirements of the Human Rights Act 1998, the Commission has sought urgent clarification from Westminster that the Bill of Rights Bill will not alter this capacity were it to become law.

=== Impact on devolution ===
Aileen McHarg (Durham Law School) gave evidence to the Joint Committee on Human Rights before the publication of the draft bill that any changes to the Human Rights Act would likely have 'knock-on consequences for the scope of devolved competence' and so engage the Sewel Convention.

=== Abortion ===
==== Labour interventions on abortion ====
Following the United States of America Supreme Court case Dobbs v. Jackson Women's Health Organization which overturned the constitutional right to abortion set out in Roe v. Wade and Planned Parenthood v. Casey, Labour MPs suggested that a right to abortion should be included within the Bill. During Prime Minister's Questions on 29 June 2022, Labour MP Rosie Duffield, suggested Dominic Raab should “send a clear signal, as some of his cabinet colleagues have done this week, that Britain respects the rights of women, and will he accept the cross-party amendment to the forthcoming bill of rights which enshrines a women’s right to choose in law?” Raab suggested that the place of abortion in UK law is settled, and resisted introducing a right into the Bill of Rights. Stella Creasy MP subsequently suggested she would propose an amendment to the Bill during its passage through parliament in order to introduce a right to abortion and hoped for a conscience vote.

==== Wider comment on abortion and the Bill ====
Dr Kirsty Hughes, Associate Professor in Public Law and Human Rights and Director of the Centre for Public Law, argues that the Bill potentially threatens the entrenchment of rights to abortion in future. Dr Hughes argues that Dominic Raab’s suggestion that ‘the position on abortion is settled in UK law’ and that he ‘would not want us to find ourselves in the US position, where the issue is litigated through the courts, rather than settled, as it is now settled…this House [of Commons]’ rests on a false premise. That is, Dr Hughes suggests, the area is not settled but is in fact currently being heavily litigated at Supreme Court level and below. She notes that in Northern Ireland Human Rights Commission for Judicial Review (Northern Ireland) [2018] UKSC 27 ‘it was argued that restrictions on abortion in Northern Ireland violated articles 3, 8 and 14 ECHR. Whilst in R (Crowter) v SSHSC [2021] EWHC 2536 (Admin) it was argued that permitting abortion where there is a substantial risk that a child would be born ‘seriously handicapped’ (the terminology used in the Abortion Act 1967), is incompatible with the Convention.’ Further to this, 'in other cases pro-life advocates argue that restricting their activities in the vicinity of abortion clinics interferes with Article 9, 10 and 11 ECHR, Dulgheriu & Orthova v Ealing LBC [2019] EWCA Civ 1490.' There is also a pending judgment from a reference by the Attorney General for Northern Ireland to the Supreme Court, heard on 19 July 2022. Resistance to making changes to the law based on the idea that it would produce undesirable litigation would then seem to be undercut by the existence of this and other litigation currently in the courts.

== See also ==
- European Convention on Human Rights
- Bill of rights
- Bill of Rights 1689
- Human Rights Act 1998
- Proposed British Bill of Rights (2015)
- Good Friday Agreement
