= Human Rights Act 2004 =

Human Rights Act 2004 (ACT)

Australian Capital Territory Legislative Assembly
- Long title: An Act that defines what a human right is and who is entitled to these rights, this accomplished by outlining civil, political, economic rights.
- Citation: Human Rights Act 2004 (ACT)
- Territorial extent: Australian Capital Territory
- Enacted by: Australian Capital Territory Legislative Assembly
- Enacted: 2 March 2004
- Assented to: 10 March 2004
- Commenced: 1 July 2004

Legislative history
- Bill title: Human Rights Bill 2003
- Introduced by: Jon Stanhope MLA, Attorney-General
- Introduced: 18 November 2003

Amends
- Rights Amendment Act 2008 (NO.3 OF 2008)
- Status: In force

The Human Rights Act 2004 is an Act of the Australian Capital Territory Legislative Assembly that recognises the fundamental human rights of individuals. Ratified by the Australia Capital Territory (ACT) Legislative Assembly on 1 July 2004, it was among the first of its kind to define and enshrine human rights into Australian law by establishing civil, political, economic, social and culture rights. The legislation followed the proposal extended by the ACT Bill of Rights Consultative Committee. This proposal embodied a community wide deliberation, designed to assess public sentiment toward human rights within the ACT. Consequently, this dialogue would go on to highlight the popularity of an ACT Charter of Human Rights among the populace.

While this piece of legislation established newly held human rights, the act itself does not inhibit already established rights and freedoms. The act explicitly outlines within section 7, "Rights apart from act", that rights established within the document are not exhaustive. Additionally, this legislation draws distinct limitations, stating that the human rights outlined are accountable to "reasonable limits" enacted by law, such that they are "demonstrably justified" throughout civilisation.

Additionally, the Act established an Australian Capital Territory Human Rights Commissioner while also empowering the ACT Supreme Court to facilitate compliance of legislation.

== Sections ==
This is an outline of the significant segments of the Human Rights Act 2004 that grant Australian rights within the ACT. (Note: Part 1 - Preliminary is not included because it does not contribute to the establishment of human rights.)

=== Part 2 – Human Rights: What are human rights? ===
This section establishes human rights by connecting civil, political, economic, social and cultural rights.

=== Part 2 – Human Rights: Who has human rights? ===
This section maintains only individuals can possess human rights.

=== Part 3 – Civil and political Rights: Recognition and equality before the law ===
This section solidifies recognition and equality before the law through three pillars. Firstly, the Act enshrines the right of the individual to be recognised before the law as a person. Secondly, every individual retains the right, detached from prejudice or difference, to enjoy their human rights. Finally, all individuals are warranted an equitable defence before the law and individuals shall be treated as equals before the law, without prejudice.

=== Part 3 – Civil and political Rights: Right to life ===
This section sets out the individual's right to life; it states that "no-one may be arbitrarily deprived of life".

=== Part 3 – Civil and political Rights: Protection from torture and cruel, inhuman or degrading way ===
This section prohibits the torture of individuals, medical or scientific experimentation in the absence of freely obtain permission from the individual and the punishment and/or treatment of an individual in a "cruel, inhuman, or degrading" manner.

=== Part 3 – Civil and political Rights: Protection of the family and children ===
This section upholds the protection of family and children by establishing two focal points. Firstly, the Act maintains that family should be afforded protection within the community because it's the "natural and basic group unit of society". Secondly, all children maintain the right to safety, unaccompanied by differentiation or prejudice.

=== Part 3 – Civil and political Rights: Freedom of thought, conscience, religion and belief ===
This section supports an individual's right to freedom of "thought, conscience and religion" by outlining two subsections. Firstly, the right to arrogate a religion or faith of one's choosing, as well as the ability to express religion or faith by "worship, observance, practice and teaching". This definition extends publicly or privately on an individual or collective basis. Secondly, no individual can be pressurised into narrowing their freedom to maintain or express their faith through "worship, observance, practice and teaching".

=== Part 3 – Civil and political Rights: Freedom of expression ===
This section facilitates the right to express oneself, irrespective of boarders, media, art, or action. Additionally, the individual's right to an opinion in the absence of intercession is outlined.

=== Part 3 – Civil and political Rights: Retrospective criminal laws ===
This section mandates that no individual can be found guilty of transgression, if such a transgression was not enshrined as an offence in law when undertaken. Additionally, harsher punishment cannot be appointed retrospectively. That is, criminal offences cannot exact punitive retribution greater than the damages that would be awarded at the time of the offence.

=== Part 3 – Children in the Criminal Process ===
This section places four pillars to children in the criminal process. Firstly, incriminated persons should be segregated from all implicated children. Secondly, the handling of the child must be congruent to a non-implicated child of the similar age. Thirdly, a trial must be produced in timely fashion. Finally, should a child be convicted, the behaviour toward this child must be conducted analogously to a non-implicated child of similar age.

==== Part 3A – Economic, social and Culture Rights: Right to an education ====
This section details the three core components of the right to education. Firstly, all children will have access to a suitable education based on the needs of the child for free. Secondly, vocational, continuing training, and further education are the right of all Australians. Thirdly, the previously described rights are subject to actualisation without discrimination and compliance with a parent's or guardian's religious and/or moral obligations, so long as, these convictions adhere to the minimal standards enacted by law.

== Case law ==
The Human Rights Act of 2004 has provided the basis for several judicial rulings within the Australian court system. This section outlines courts cases where the Human Rights Act of 2004 influenced judicial rulings.

=== Imran Hakimi v Legal Aid Commission (ACT) ===
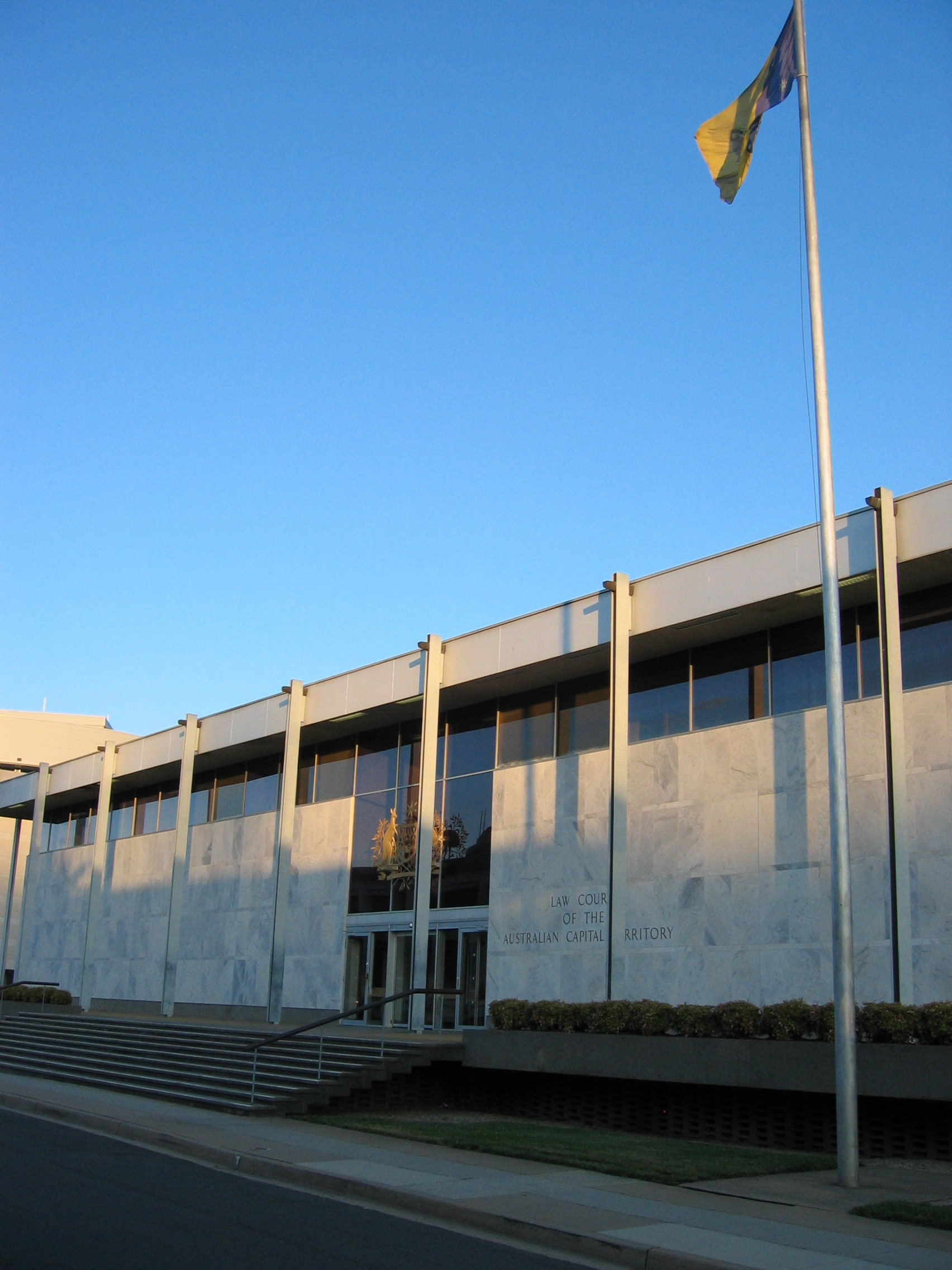
The ACT Law Courts building housing the Supreme Court of the Australian Capital Territory.

Hakimi sought Romano's representation in a criminal defence matter. Hakimi did not possess the necessary resources required for his defence. As such, Hakimi applied for legal aid and it was granted, however, in place of monetary assistance, the Legal Aid Commission (ACT) approved the services of a lawyer. Mr. Hakimi found this disagreeable, as he wanted to obtain the services of Mr. Romano. Consequently, Romano argued that the Human Rights Act of 2004 granted Hakimi the power to contract his services and the that Legal Aid Commission (ACT) was solely responsible for the remuneration of those services under the Human Right Act 2004 section 22.

Accordingly, the Legal Aid Commission (ACT) claimed, that Romano's interpretation of section 22 was not the intention of the provision and that there were reasonable limitations on this provision.

In conclusion, Justice Refshauge of the Supreme Court found that "common sense and international jurisprudence" dictated the Human Rights Act does not pronounce an unconditional right to be represented by a lawyer of the accused's choosing, citing R v Williams 2006. As a result, Mr Hakimi's application was unsuccessful.

=== R v Kalachoff ===
Kalachoff was facing trail for the offence of "recklessly inflicting grievous bodily harm". For this trial, Kalachoff applied to the Legal Aid Commission (ACT) in order to acquire remuneration for the presiding counsel.

In response, the Legal Aid Office (ACT) refused to provide the required funding. As such, Kalachoff's presiding counsel argued that under the Human Rights Act 2004, Kalachoff's right to a fair trial had been violated.

Justice Burns of the Supreme Court found this argument to be "misguided". Justice Burns pointed out, that the Human Rights Act grants individual legal assistance before the law and should justice depend upon it, this assistance will be appointed at no cost. In making these points Justice Burns explained, that these rights should not be conflated into a compelled "hybrid guarantee" of funding for a defendant's chosen legal defence. The Justice maintains, that such a position violates the Legal Aid Act 1977 (ACT). This resulted in the rejection of Kalachoff's appeal.

=== Dennis Michael Nova v The Queen (2012) ===
The case of Dennis Michael Nova v The Queen (2012) was heard in the Supreme Court by Justice Richard Refshauge who evaluated the halt in legal proceedings pertaining to Nova's charges being brought to trial. The decision of the court utilised common law and the Human Rights Act 2004 (ACT) to reach a verdict.

With respect to common law, Justice Refshauge acknowledged the "appalling delay" in the proceedings; however, the Justice was unconvinced Nova would experience prejudice relating to matters of fair trial. Additionally, Justice Refshauge pointed out the delay was not the result of "inaction on the part of authorities". As such, Justice Refshauge remained dissatisfied with the idea that the defendant's trial would be tainted by prejudice.

In addressing common law, Justice Refshauge moved to examine the parameters under the Human Rights Act 2004. The court investigated the basis for a stay under section 22 – Rights in Criminal Proceedings. Section 22 outlines that an individual "charged with a criminal offence" holds the right to a trail unencumbered by excessive postponement. Justice Refshauge explained that a delay in proceedings does not itself constituted a violation of the Act. Nonetheless, given the three year and four-month delay in bringing this matter to trail, Justice Refshauge concluded that the defendant's rights were violated, citing section 22 of Human Rights Act. In Justice Refshauge's ruling, this breach was acknowledged on the record.

== Reception ==
The Human Rights Act of 2004 was at the forefront of establishing human rights in Australia. Being the first of its kind, the Act's efficacy and scope are debated by legal scholars.

=== Support ===
Jon Stanhope, who served on council for ACT civil liberties as president, states that the Human Rights Act is "one of the most important pieces of legislation" passed in Australia. Nevertheless, Stanhope acknowledges that "the act is not an end in itself" but will be used to encourage norms and customs that respect human rights.

Michael Walton, a senior lecturer in public policy at Harvard Kennedy School, stated that this piece of legislation provides an honest accounting of the International Covenant on Civil and Political Rights. Notwithstanding, Walton takes issue with specific sections of the Act. For example, when an individual's rights have been violated under the Act, there is no path to remuneration through litigation.

George Williams, a Scientia Professor at the University of New South Wales, and Lara Kostakidis-Lianos, a member of the University of New South Wales Law Journal, wrote about the connection between the Human Rights Act and the International Covenant on Civil and Political Rights. The pair comment that the Act's biggest advantage is the board spectrum of knowledge available. According to them, by using this knowledge to iteratively refine itself, this legislation might be Australia's greatest tool to protect rights and responsibilities, despite concerns of opaque terminology.

Jim McGinty, a retired Attorney-General of Western Australia, describes the legislation as "ground-breaking" and providing an "express list" of civil and political protections. McGinty comments, that unlike previous protections, the Human Rights Act establishes a connection between the individual and the government; without this partnership, the rights enshrined in the Act may become brittle, similar to analogous protections afforded within other legislative accounts.

=== Criticism ===
Helen Watchirs, the president of the ACT Human Right Commission, and Gabrielle McKinnon, a director on the Australian National University research project into the Human Rights Act, levy heavy criticism, describing the moderate influence of the Human Rights Act within the judicial system. Watchirs and McKinnon comment that a "great many cases" have been adjudicated without careful analysis and scrutiny of raised provisions pertaining to the Human Rights Act.

== Amendments ==
The Human Rights Amendment Act 2008 clarified various areas of confusion in Human Rights Act of 2004. Enshrined by the Australian Capital Territory Legislative Assembly, the following amendments came into effect on 4 March 2008.

=== Interpretation of law and human rights ===
This section sought to elucidate the interpretation of ACT law, dictating that when congruous to a legislation's aim, interpretation must be consistent with human rights.

=== Notice to Attorney-General and Commission ===
The following amendment specifies who the Supreme Court should communicate with, in the event that a case is heard that relates to an individual exercising a human right. It is made explicit that both the Attorney-General and the Human Rights Commissioner should be notified.

== See also ==
- Bill of rights
- Victorian Charter of Human Rights and Responsibilities
