= Charter of Human Rights and Responsibilities Act 2006 =

Australian state law

Parliament of Victoria
- Long title: An Act to protect and promote human rights, to make consequential amendments to certain Acts and for other purposes.
- Citation: No. 43 of 2006
- Territorial extent: Victoria
- Passed by: Legislative Assembly
- Passed: 15 June 2006
- Passed by: Legislative Council
- Passed: 20 July 2006
- Royal assent: 25 July 2006
- Commenced: 1 January 2007

Legislative history

Initiating chamber: Legislative Assembly
- Bill title: Charter of Human Rights and Responsibilities Bill
- Introduced by: Rob Hulls
- First reading: 2 May 2006
- Second reading: 13–15 June 2006
- Third reading: 15 June 2006

Revising chamber: Legislative Council
- Bill title: Charter of Human Rights and Responsibilities Bill
- Member(s) in charge: Justin Madden
- First reading: 18 July 2006
- Second reading: 20 July 2006
- Third reading: 20 July 2006

Related legislation
- Human Rights Act 2004 (ACT No. A2004-5)
- Status: In force (amended)

The Charter of Human Rights and Responsibilities Act 2006 is an Act of Parliament of the state of Victoria, Australia, designed to protect and promote human rights.

It does so by enumerating a series of human rights, largely developed from those in the International Covenant of Civil and Political Rights, along with a number of enforcement provisions. The Act came into full effect on 1 January 2008 and may operate in a similar way to the UK's Human Rights Act 1998 or the Canadian Bill of Rights.

== About the act ==
The Act protects twenty one fundamental human rights, including:

- Right to recognition and equality before the law (section 8)
- Right to life (section 9)
- Right to protection from torture and cruel, inhuman or degrading treatment (section 10)
- Right to freedom from forced work (section 11)
- Right to freedom of movement (section 12)
- Right to privacy and reputation (section 13)
- Right to freedom of thought, conscience, religion and belief (section 14)
- Right to freedom of expression (section 15)
- Right to peaceful assembly and freedom of association (section 16)
- Right to protection of families and children (section 17)
- Right to taking part in public life (section 18)
- Cultural rights (section 19)
- Property rights (section 20)
- Right to liberty and security of person (section 21)
- Right to humane treatment when deprived of liberty (section 22)
- Rights of children in the criminal process (section 23)
- Right to a fair hearing (section 24)
- Rights in criminal proceedings (section 25)
- Right not to be tried or punished more than once (section 26)
- Retrospective criminal laws (section 27)

== History ==
Australia is the only democratic country in the world to not have a Bill of Rights (or similar protections). In order to go some way toward addressing this, in 2005 the Australian Capital Territory (ACT) undertook steps to implement the Human Rights Act 2004 to formally protect de facto freedom, respect, equality and dignity in the jurisdiction.

The Victorian Labor Government, in 2005 under the Bracks Ministry, engaged in community consultation for a Human Rights act similar to those implemented in the ACT and the UK's Human Rights Act 1998. Attorney-General of Victoria Rob Hulls argued that a Bill of Rights would "strengthen our democracy and set out our rights in one accessible place." After community consultation, including input from the Australian Human Rights Commission, the act was introduced and debated in Parliament on 2 May 2008. The Victorian Charter of Human Rights and Responsibilities Act 2006 received royal assent on 25 July 2006 and came into full effect on 1 January 2008.

== Limitation and jurisdiction ==
As state-based legislation, the act does not provide any protection outside the Victorian jurisdiction, including to federal law within the state. The charter also affords Parliament the power to suspend or infringe rights in exceptional circumstances, such as when facing a serious security threat or a state of emergency.

Courts do not have the authority to strike down impeding legislation, but are able to interpret statutory provisions in a way that is compatible with human rights.

== See also ==
- Human Rights Act 2004 — similar legislation in the Australian Capital Territory
