= Human Rights Act 2019 =

Queensland legislation

Human Rights Act 2019 (Qld)

Parliament of Queensland
- Long title: An Act to respect, protect and promote human rights
- Citation: Act No. 5 of 2019
- Assented to: 7 March 2019
- Commenced: 1 July 2019

Legislative history
- Bill title: Human Rights Bill 2018
- Bill citation: Bill No. 5 of 2019
- Introduced by: Yvette D'Ath MP, Attorney General
- Introduced: 31 October 2018
- First reading: 31 October 2018
- Second reading: 26 – 27 February 2019
- Third reading: 7 March 2019

Keywords
- human rights
- Status: Amended

The Human Rights Act 2019 is an act of the Parliament of Queensland that recognises human rights of individuals.

== Provisions ==
The Act implements

- a right to education,
- a right to health,
- a right to life.
- a right to liberty and security of person

The Act implements

- a freedom of association,
- a freedom from forced labour,
- a freedom of movement,
- a freedom of expression.

The Act implements cultural rights for Aboriginal people and Torres Strait Islanders, as well as people generally. The Act implements property rights. The Act requires humane treatment in detention and imprisonment; fair hearings. The Act implements rights in criminal proceedings regarding children specifically as well as in general, and applies retrospectively to criminal laws. The Act implements a right not to be punished more than once.

The Act implements a "dialogue" model for human rights.

== Uses ==
Under the Act, Queensland Police Service recognised the cultural rights of Wangan and Jagalingou cultural custodians to conduct ceremonies.

== Instances of overriding ==
In February 2023, the Act was overridden to make it illegal for children to breach bail.

In August 2023, the Act was overridden to pass legislation to imprison children in police watch houses for adults.

In December 2024, the Act was overridden to pass legislation to sentence children as adults, which was criticised by the United Nations Committee on the Rights of the Child.
