= Cluster of Excellence "Asia and Europe in a Global Context" =

German research facility

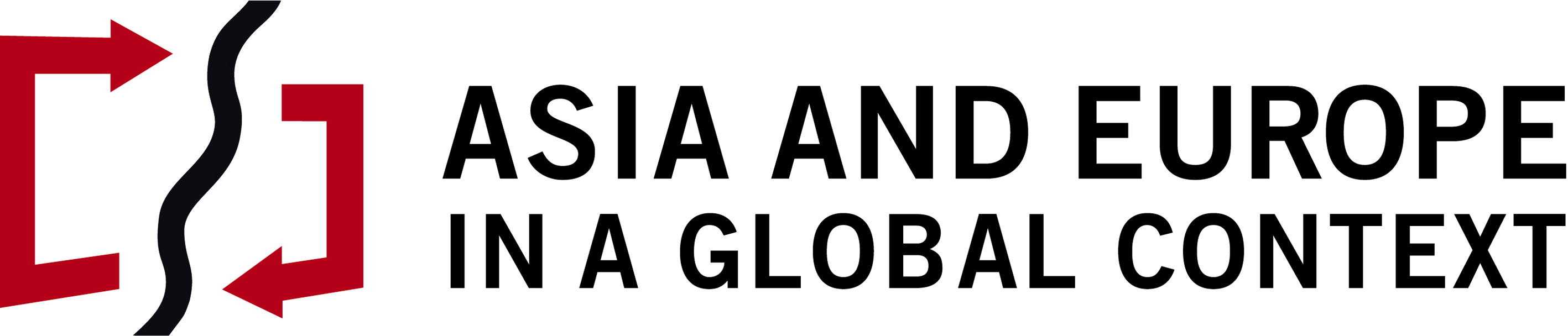
- Established: October 2007
- Director: Prof. Dr. Joseph Maran, Prof. Dr. Axel Michaels, Prof. Dr. Barbara Mittler
- Location: Heidelberg, Baden-Württemberg, Germany
- Campus: Karl Jaspers Centre for Advanced Transcultural Studies, Heidelberg University
- Website: www.asia-europe.uni-heidelberg.de

The Cluster of Excellence "Asia and Europe in a Global Context" is a research facility funded in the framework of the German Universities Excellence Initiative of the federal state governments of Germany since October 2017. It is a trans- and interdisciplinary network of researchers affiliated with Heidelberg University. A key research area of the Cluster is the process of exchange between cultures of Asia and Europe, ranging from migration and trade to the formation of concepts and institutions. Shortly it is meant to understand and fill the cultural gap between two continents for the ease of trade and migration.

== Overview ==
The Cluster aims at enhancing the understanding of the multi-layered interactions between and within Asia and Europe. During the first funding period from 2008 to 2012, the Cluster's focus was on "Shifting Asymmetries in Cultural Flows", and in the second funding period until October 2017, the Cluster focused on "The Dynamics of Transculturality".

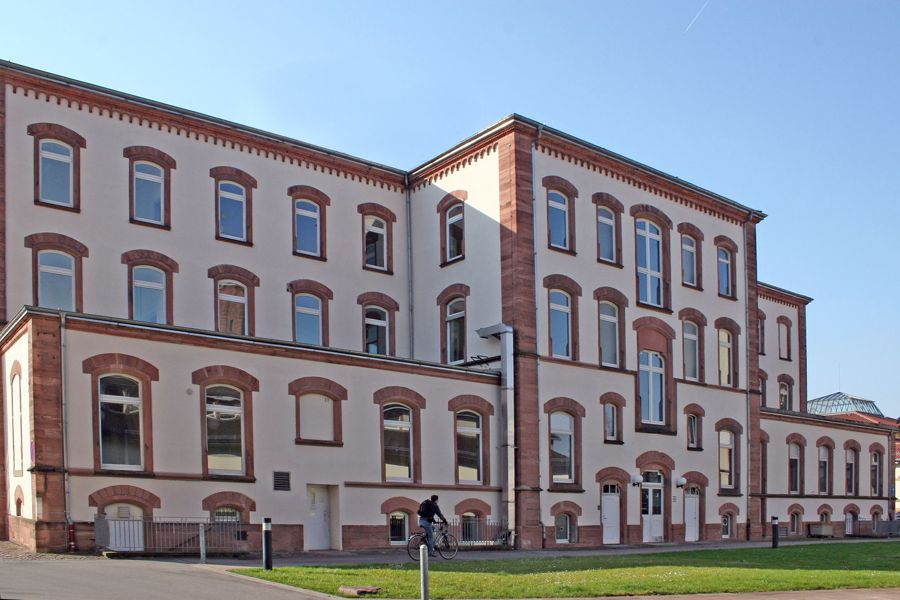
Karl Jaspers Centre for Advanced Transcultural Studies

The Cluster is located at the Karl Jaspers Center for Advanced Transcultural Studies (KJC) at Heidelberg University, Germany. The KJC provides facilities and infrastructure for collaboration, research and teaching. A branch office of the Cluster is located at the “Heidelberg Center South Asia” in New Delhi, India.

The Cluster is headed by three directors, who are Joseph Maran (Pre- and Protohistory), Axel Michaels (Classical Indology) and Barbara Mittler (Sinology).

== Research ==
The research projects are organized in four research areas: “Governance & Administration”, “Public Spheres”, “Knowledge Systems” and “Historicities & Heritage”. Five professorships in Buddhist Studies, Cultural Economic History, Global Art History, Intellectual History, Visual and Media Anthropology as well as two Start-Up Professorships for Transcultural Studies and Junior Research Groups headed by post-doctoral scholars are located at the Cluster.

The “Heidelberg Research Architecture”, the Digital Humanities unit at the Cluster, develops metadata frameworks.

Research results are published in international journals and book series. The Cluster has launched two-book series -“Transcultural Research: Heidelberg Studies on Asia and Europe in a Global Context” and “Heidelberg Transcultural Studies” – as well as the e-journal “Transcultural Studies”. All of them are peer-reviewed.

== Teaching ==
The Master of Arts program "Transcultural Studies" started in the winter term 2011/12 at Heidelberg University and combines interdisciplinary education with a transcultural focus. Language of instruction is English.

The "Graduate Programme for Transcultural Studies" offers a structured doctoral program within the interdisciplinary research environment of the Cluster.
