= Gerd Althoff =

German historian

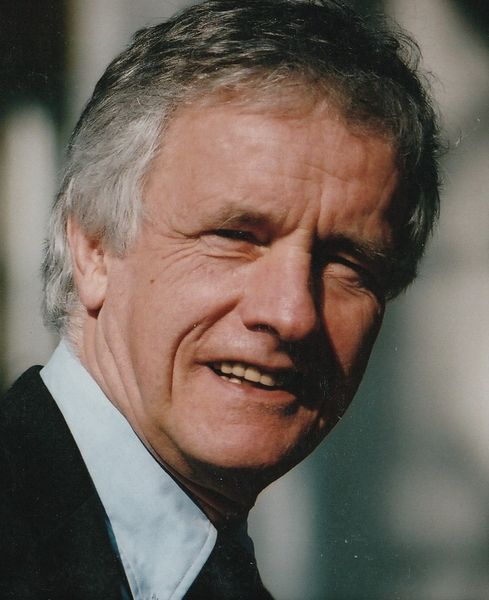
Althoff in 2005

Gerd Althoff (born 9 July 1943) is a German historian of the Early and High Middle Ages. He presents himself (in words used as part of the title of one of his many books) as a researcher into the "political rules of the game" in the Middle Ages. He has held professorships at the University of Münster (1986–1990 and 1997–2011), the University of Giessen (1990–1995) and the University of Bonn (1995–1997).

The fruits of Althoff's research on the Ottonian period have been enriched by collaboration with his fellow medievalist at the University of Münster, Hagen Keller. Together they have, in the eyes of admirers, significantly raised the status of the University of Münster as a centre for the study of medieval history. Althoff's own research on the operation of medieval statehood, medieval forms of public communication, the connections binding different groups together and the means of conflict resolution applied, have since the 1980s exercised a significant influence on German and international "Mediävistics" and driven important re-evaluations of Early and High Medieval kingship.

== Life ==
Gerd Althoff was born in Hamburg during the Second World War, and grew up in the Münsterland region near the Dutch border. He attended the "Amtsgymnasium" (secondary school) in Ibbenbüren until 1963. Between 1965 and 1970 he studied Germanistics at the University of Münster and Heidelberg University. The switch to History was triggered by Althoff's involvement in the "68 movement" and the need, cited by many West Germans of his generation, to confront recent history and the Hitler nightmare in which most Germans of the older generation – albeit with wildly varying levels of enthusiasm and commitment – were believed by the young people to have participated. He launched his academic career at Münster by assisting the medievalist Karl Schmid (medievalist) on the latter's "Personen und Gemeinschaften" (loosely, "individuals and society") project, which was part of a broader Medieval Research programme at Münster. His first piece of published research, in 1973, concerned a list of monks at the old monastery in Prüm that is included in Prüm's Carolingian "Liber aureus". He received his doctorate (post-graduate degree) at the University of Münster a year later in return for a piece of work on the Necrology of the Stift Borghorst at Borghorst. The work was supervised by Karl Schmid who, a little earlier had been offered and accepted a teaching chair at the University of Freiburg. Althoff followed him, remaining at the University of Freiburg as a research assistant for the next six years.

It was at the University of Freiburg that in 1981 Althoff received his habilitation (higher degree). His dissertation on this occasion was based on research into the Billung and Ottonian dynasties: it was published in 1984, entitled "Adels- und Königsfamilien im Spiegel ihrer Memorialüberlieferung ..." (loosely, "Nobility and royalty through the mirror of their memorialised traditions ..."). In 1986 Althoff succeeded Peter Johanek as Professor for Medieval History at the University of Münster. He moved again in 1990 when he took over the teaching chair in Medieval and Modern History at Gießen in succession to Carlrichard Brühl. There, between 1991 and 1995, he was co-instigator and then supervisor of the graduate school of "Medieval and Modern Statehood". He also served in 1992 as managing director of the university's Historical Institute and during 1993/94 as Dean of the History Faculty. In 1995, Althoff accepted an invitation to transfer to the University of Bonn. At the University of Bonn, he was again appointed to a professorship in Medieval and Modern History, this time in succession to Rudolf Schieffer who had moved to LMU Munich. He delivered his inaugural lecture in December 1995 on the topic of "Outrage, tears and contrition: Emotion in the public communication of the Middle Ages". (Note: A version of this lecture, complete with extensive referencing and sourcing, appeared in Frühmittelalterliche Studien vol.30 (pages 60 - 79) in 1996.) The theme was one to which he would return. In 1996, Althoff was appointed managing director of the University of Bonn's "Historical Seminar" (department). He nevertheless accepted the opportunity presented by the retirement in 1996 of Joachim Wollasch to return to the University of Münster in 1997 as Professor for Medieval History. He gave his inaugural lecture on the importance of Symbolische Kommunikation for understanding the Middle Ages. During 1998/99, he served as managing director at the University of Münster's "Historical Seminar" (department). He retired from his full-time posts at the University of Münster in 2011. His farewell lecture, which was also published in Frühmittelalterliche Studien, concerned "Monarch in the High Middle Ages".

Althoff taught several students at the University of Giessen, the University of Bonn and the University of Münster who have subsequently achieved significant academic notability in their own right, including Hermann Kamp, Steffen Krieb, Claudia Garnier and Christiane Witthöft.

Beyond his wide-ranging mainstream professorial work in Germany, Althoff acquired several international guest professorships, notably at the University of California, Berkeley (1995), the School for Advanced Studies in the Social Sciences (EHESS) in Paris (1998), and at Moscow State University (2011). He was critically involved in planning, organising and publicising the high-profile 2012 "Goldene Pracht. Mittelalterliche Schatzkunst in Westfalen" (exhibition of medieval goldsmiths' work and other precious jewellery), presented in Münster, also authoring the 482-page programme for the exhibition. Three years earlier he had been similarly engaged with the "Spektakel der Macht" (loosely, "Visions of power") exhibition in Magdeburg.

Althoff's long association with the specialist journal Frühmittelalterliche Studien has included a decade as sole editor-publisher, between 2001 and 2011, and further terms as co-editor-publisher, between 1998 and 2001, and again since 2012. In 1997, he became director of the Münster Institute of Early Middle Ages Research, and became supervisor of Münster's graduate school of "Writing culture and society in the Middle Ages".

== Memberships ==
Althoff has been a member of the Medieval Working Circle at the Herzog August Library in Wolfenbüttel since 1999, of the Association for Constitutional History, of the Konstanz Working Circle for Middle Ages History (since 1993) and, since 2003, a full member of the Westphalia Historical Commission.

== Research focus ==
Althoff's principal research themes include the modalities of medieval state structures, conflict management and resolution in the Middle Ages, the forms and frameworks governing public communication (so-called "symbolic communication") and networking within and between groups in the medieval period. Many of his essays on these themes, produced since the 1980s, have been gathered together and published in two volumes (Note: 1997: "Spielregeln der Politik im Mittelalter. Kommunikation in Frieden und Fehde" and 2003: "Inszenierte Herrschaft. Geschichtsschreibung und politisches Handeln im Mittelalter".) Many of his studies on the Ottonian and Salian periods have become standard works for scholars, along with Althoff's publications on the power of ritual and his biographical pieces on relatives, friends and collaborators of the dynasts. A particularly fruitful exchange took place between Althoff and his University of Münster colleague Hagen Keller on the subject of Ottonian historiography in respect of group behaviour and the nature of the Ottonian "state". In 1985, the two historians teamed up to produce a double biography of the first two Ottonian rulers, Henry I and Otto I. They were able to show that Henry had secured his rule with friendship-based political alliances (amicitiae). In a departure from the traditional view, Althoff and Keller interpreted Henry's rejection of an episcopal anointment not as a provocative anti-church move intended to rile the bishops, but as a sign that he preferred to consolidate his royal rule through a more collaborative approach. This contrasted strikingly with the accepted nineteenth century interpretations which had anachronistically imputed to tenth century kingship a strong and powerfully assertive exercise of "royal prerogative" constantly seeking to prevail over a permanently truculent nobility. For Althoff and Keller, Henry I and Otto I were not symbolic precursors of Germany's later power and grandeur, but distant representatives of an archaic society, firmly rooted not in subsequent developments but in its own past. In 1996 Althoff added a biography of Otto III and in 2006 another, this time of the Salian, "Canossa pilgrim" Henry IV. Both books have entered the historical canon as standard works.

In the first part of April 2006 Althoff initiated Spring conference of the Konstanz Working Group for Medieval History to be held on the Island of Reichenau and mark the 900th anniversary year of Henry's death. Speakers included Tilman Struve, Rudolf Schieffer, Steffen Patzold, Claudia Zey, Matthias Becher and Stefan Weinfurter. Many of the allegations made against the king by generations of historians were revisited. In 2008 a jointly authored volume by Althoff and Keller appeared in the Handbuch der deutschen Geschichte series entitled "Die Zeit der späten Karolinger und der Ottonen. Krisen und Konsolidierungen 888–1024". The book's stated objective was to provide nothing less than "a fundamental revision of the traditional historical perspective .... [by] denationalising the [hitherto mainstream historiographical] vision of the Ottonian state". The book's insights and conclusions would not have come as a total surprise to attentive students of the period, since Althoff had already provided an overview of them eight years earlier.

In 2011, jointly with Christel Meier, Althoff produced a study of Irony in the Middle Ages. The authors' objective was to provide "a new start for future research" on the theme. In 2013, Althoff published his study "Selig sind, die Verfolgung ausüben" as a contribution to the "Excellence Cluster" for "Religion und Politik in den Kulturen der Vormoderne und der Moderne". In it, he tackled some of the contentious themes involving the papacy and the frequent application of papal violence in the High Middle Ages. Althoff had inferred that the papacy had developed its own structure of theories to justify the application of violence as a device to validate the prioritization of its own vision for the world. This immediately brought the question of obedience to the fore as a guiding necessity. Disobedience was characterised as a heresy against which force should be applied. The book resonated strongly with commentators and readers because the situation at the time of its appearance made it particularly topical, notably because of its approach to the history of ideas and the way in which its structure incorporated tightly source-based argumentation.

Based on his long-running research into the "political rules of the game", and the use of rituals and symbols in medieval public communication, in 2016 Althoff produced his "systematic presentation" of political advice provided to kings on the Middle Ages, and the roles of his lordly advisors. Hitherto, he noted, medievalists had paid little attention to the advice received by kings from politically influential members of his court. According to Althoff the process whereby the king invited and received this counselling created a participatory style of government which had the practical effect of limiting arbitrary and whimsical governance by the ruler. As a result of the part played by royal advisors in German history between the ninth and twelfth centuries, Althoff identified the development of a political culture of "managed consensus building" ("gelenkten Konsensherstellung") under Charlemagne which formed the basis for a significantly enhanced level of participation in government both by church leaders and by the nobility.

=== Networking ===
Althoff's pioneering research on the importance in medieval government of political and social groupings, and of the links between them, has as its starting point the work of Gerd Tellenbach and his "Freiburg working circle" students at Freiburg i.B. During the 1950s, Tellenbach recognised significant patterns in the groupings into which the lists of names in Confraternity/Memorial Books were arranged. Using various different "memorial sources", such as confraternity books, necrologies and registries of deaths/burials, important sources for the histories of nobility families and family research could be derived for the then badly under-researched (even in Germany) period between the eighth and tenth centuries. This intensive prosopographical "names research" acquired its own momentum and developed into a major project in "Mediävistics". The work was taken forward, in particular by Karl Schmid and Joachim Wollasch, both of whom were students of Tellenbach. Gerd Althoff was a student of Karl Schmid. During 1981/82, as part of the "Groups creation and groups consciousness in the Middle Ages" research project, Althoff worked with Schmid in a close study of the listings of names entered in the "Gedenkbuch" (loosely, "memorialisation book") from Reichenau Monastery, which they compared with those from the monasteries at St.Gallen and Fulda as well as that from the Convent at Remiremont (Lorraine). They were struck by the way in which members of leading families had increasingly asserted their importance by entering the names of their relations and friends, with accompanying entreaties that the monks and nuns should pray for the immortal souls of those departed, in "Gedenkbücher" at each of several different religious houses. The researchers determined that the family associations and mergers implicit in the Gedenkbücher listings were part of a more general pattern behaviour designed peacefully to create and enhance cohesion within leading families, and to engender mutual support between them. They were struck by the way in which the quantity of such entries in the Reichenau Gedenkbuch increased steadily between 825 and 936, and then fell off abruptly after the death in 936 of King Henry I. Exactly the same pattern was identified at St.Gallen, Fulda and Remiremont. By drilling down into the family connections of the individuals listed, Althoff established a clear association between the intensification of Gedenkbuch entries and the alliances that King Henry established with the leading families involved. This was clearly reflected in the king's efforts to consolidate his royal lordship through Amicitia (friendship) alliances entered into with the dukes during the tenth century. Henry's son and successor, Otto I, abandoned the mutual family alliances ("pacta mutua") with the leading families: this led to conflicts. These insights are chronicled in considerable depth in Althoff's various substantial publications, starting in 1985, on Henry I and Otto I. Althoff's shared insights on the importance of friendship alliances and oaths of mutual support have significantly enhanced understanding and have become widely accepted among scholars researching Henry I and his Ottonian successors.

In a contribution published in 1983, Althoff focused on a monk called "Widukind" who is identified as "Dominator Widukind" in the Reichenau confraternity book ("Verbrüderungsbuch") of Reichenau Abbey. Althoff, in his essay, identifies "Dominator Widukind" as no less a man than Duke Widukind, baptised, according to the Reichenau records, in 785. Widukind was an (originally "pagan") leader who between 777 and 785 waged war against Charlemagne. Those wars had ended with the Carolingian annexation of Saxons and the triumphant conversion of the Saxons to Christianity. According to Althoff, his research confirmed that those wars also ended with Duke Widukind banished to the island monastery at Reichenau and, following baptism, obliged to spend the rest of his life as a monk. Althoff's conclusions on this matter remain contentious among medievalists.

Althoff also worked on a major project to publish transcribed so-called "Memorial sources". Together with Joachim Wollasch he published a compilation of monastic necrologies from Merseburg, Magdeburg and Lüneburg. Combining the work undertaken for this project and the work undertaken for his habilitation dissertation, using information from the Saxon necrologies from the Billung and Ottonian monastic records from Lüneburg and Merseburg, he was able to identify kinship connections and friendship alliances created and sustained during the period between noble and royal families. The networks he identified included three popes, 190 bishops and archbishops, 92 abbots and abbesses. 51 kings and queens, 47 dukes and other members of ducal families along with 182 counts and countesses. The usefulness of Althoff's work on so-called memorialised traditions was questioned by Johannes Fried and simply rejected by Hartmut Hoffmann. Althoff and Wollasch responded to the criticisms from these medievalist colleagues with their own robust reply.

In 1990 Althoff published the results of his researches into the formation of social groupings and the characteristics of the resulting group consciousness during the tenth century. A follow-up followed in 1992. He was able to show that extended kinship networking and with friendship-based political alliances (amicitiae) between leading families were more important than equivalent ties to the rules. Obligations to the king took second place. The alliances between the families were further strengthened through "Coniurationes" (oaths of mutual obligation). These insights left the earlier historiography of the period, represented by historians associated with National Socialism such as Otto Brunner and Theodor Mayer (historian), of a state held together by personal loyalty and allegiance to a kingly ruler, looking anachronistic and badly outdated. Althoff was also able to identify an association between a surge in additions to the monastic "Gedenkbücher" of the time of Henry I with measures that had become necessary to repulse a new wave of Magyar attacks. Earlier generations of medievalists had often portrayed King Henry as temperamentally distanced from the church, but nevertheless invoking religious and spiritual backing in his defensive strategy against the Magyars. But Althoff was also able to show that the increase in "Gedenkbuch" registrations during the period was not restricted to Saxony and Franconia. His insights are therefore highly significant for research into the power structure and human networks across the entire empire during its post-Carolingian formative period in the tenth century. Revelations from the new more intense research into the "memorial sources" preserved in the monasteries brought a whole new appreciation and detailed understanding of the connections between the nobility, the church and the king. These were insights that had not been accessible to early generations of more "constitutionally focused" historians. They provided important context for existing Ottonian historiography, while also creating a range of new questions that can be applied to all the contemporaneous and subsequent sources. An entire re-working and re-evaluation of the Ottonian tradition has thereby come to the fore.

Since as far back as 1980 Althoff's interest in networking among the movers and shakers of tenth century Germany had been wide-reaching. In his 1982 study, "Zur Frage nach der Organisation sächsischer coniurationes in der Ottonenzeit", he shewed how key participants in Duke Lindolf's insurrection of 953/954 were members of the senior nobility, with their own close connections to the family of the king himself. These noble brothers-in-arms were organised into a form of fraternity or guild, and shared together in a ceremony commemorating the dead ("... ein gemeinsames Totengedenken") and ritual feasting ("convivia") as the launching point of their armed insurrection. These insights were decisive for subsequent research on how conflicts were structured, the concomitant use of violence and the submission rituals that conventionally ensued. Studies of banquets as a ritualised way of cementing peace and of the different approaches taken to political consultation followed, with continuing interrogation in the Ottonian context of "Feast and treaty" ("Fest und Bündnis") and the character in a medieval political context of Huld "Gratia" (loosely, "Huld" / "grace") or Genugtuung "satisfactio" (loosely, "Genugtuung" / "full satisfaction"). Further excursions by medievalists into group behaviour among leading families continued to be unleashed by conflict resolution research.

=== Conflict ===
Traditional research on the period had concentrated extensively on the king's courts. Viewed through this perspective, conflict was resolved primarily through court rulings. In 1927 the influential legal historian Heinrich Mitteis published work summarizing his research on medieval political trials (Note: Heinrich Mitteis: "Politische Prozesse des frühen Mittelalters in Deutschland und Frankreich", 1927) conducted before the kings' courts between approximately 900 and 1300. By the 1970s, especially among American medievalists, an appreciation had developed that conflicts during the medieval period could only be adequately evaluated if they were addressed also through the prisms of the social-sciences and in their cultural contexts, and not solely on the basis of intensive study of medieval court records. Conflicts resulted from shifts between and within social networks and needed to be understood in societal and cultural terms. Cultural elements in this instance included in the first instance rituals, gestures and ceremonies. Excessive reliance placed only on written records, accepted at face value and only in their own terms, was also questioned.

Since the 1980s Althoff has taken a lead in the German-speaking world in research on medieval conflict management and conflict resolution. He has followed the increasingly mainstream Anglo-American insight that accords an important role to conflicts that were managed and resolved without reference to the kings' courts, and he has accepted that rituals, gestures and ceremonies all play an important role. He has also developed his ideas in the context of medieval statehood as more broadly understood. Althoff and Hagen Keller highlighted the impossibility of trying to describe the tenth-century Ottonian state through the elements and categories characteristic of the twentieth-century state, since in most respects the tenth century managed without using written documents, without "state institutions", without agreed and regulated competences and responsibilities and – most importantly – without the ruler enjoying anything close to a monopoly on violence. Even more obviously than in the earlier Carolingian period, the king's power and authority in the tenth century was based on his own personality, because consensus derived from his meetings and other, mostly public, interactions with the leading members of the leading families. For leadership and resolution of conflict a succession of public spectacles and events, combined with symbolic messaging and ritualised chains of communications were often effective. From this central importance of personal connection and symbolic forms of communication, Althoff derived his thesis of "Ottonian kingship without the state", which he pointedly contrasted with the previous century's "Carolingian statehood". Althoff set out to answer the question of how "kingship" could function in an age without fixed written norms. He comes back to the firm conclusion that conflict management cannot be explained in terms of modern thinking, involving state institutions and written laws. Instead, "unwritten rules of the game" emerged in the tenth and eleventh centuries, which were hardly less binding on the parties involved than the body of written laws on which the modern state is based. An important starting point for sharing his insights on conflict in the medieval period was the lecture "Royal Rule and Conflict Behaviour in the Tenth and Eleventh centuries" which Althoff delivered at the 1988 "German Historians' Day" conference at Bamberg (of which he was himself one of the organisers). The lectures delivered at the conference were published in Frühmittelalterliche Studien during 1989.

Althoff investigated the operation of royal rule in the absence of state institutions, studying the actions of kings and nobles in conflict situations. Where the parties to the conflict were the king and his leading nobles, both the cause(s) of the conflict and the way(s) in which it was progressed and resolved were explored and discerned. Such conflicts revealed both the possibilities and the limits of medieval kingship. There was, according to Althoff, a very clear distinction to be drawn with Anglo-American historiography of France, Iceland or England in the Middle Ages, in respect of which it is not unreasonable to investigate conflict through court records, and the Ottonian-Salian "state" which could be studied more usefully through what he termed "historiographical texts". These provided "for the centuries under research, the most abundant and the most detailed information about ritual actions". From these sources, Althoff was able to discern a model for conflict resolution: one of the parties to the conflict declared himself willing to submit to the will of the other, following the intervention of mediators. This took place in a public ritual known as a deditio. The individual performing the deditio was required to demonstrate his self-humiliation by removing his shoes, donning a penitential robe or copiously weeping, before throwing himself at the feet of the king, begging that the king do with him as he would. The king would then raise the supplicant from the ground and show forgiveness with a kiss or a hug. Following a brief symbolic term of imprisonment the supplicant would then have his previous obligations and offices restored to him. This enabled the king to display magnanimity. Nothing about this ritual was spontaneous. The matter(s) under dispute had been fully discussed and explained and clearly agreed, in confidence, by the mediators. The deditio was simply the carefully staged outcome of those negotiations. The mediators were in most cases the most influential men in the kingdom at the time, and were not bound by the king's instructions. Their involvement therefore served as an important constraint on the arbitrary exercise of royal power during the early and high Middle Ages. Their purpose was to show the conflicting parties a way forward by proposing solutions that could be acceptable to both sides. Where the king violated an agreement previously entered into, it was not unusual for the mediators to intervene on behalf of the wronged party. Althoff identified the removal to a monastery of the oath-breaker Tassilo of Bavaria, by virtue of the so-called "Ingelheim judgment" of 788, as an early example of the process in operation. By the time of Louis the Pious there was a "fully identified deditio ritual" in evidence. As a rule, the deditio could not be arbitrarily repeated. If a party, having once found leniency and forgiveness in the process, subsequently reopened a conflict, he should expect harsh punishment. Althoff also shared his conclusion that access to the deditio ritual was a privilege reserved for the high nobility. On this point he faced criticism from the medievalist Jean-Marie Moeglin, who welcomed and shared Althoff's emphasis on the significance in the structure of medieval society of "unwritten laws", but felt that Althoff had excessively downplayed the importance of traditional German constitutionalist historiography in respect of the Ottonian period. With specific reference to Althoff's conclusions on the significance of deditio, Moeglin insisted that, far from being a privilege reserved for the nobility the "submission ritual" extended across the entire social spectrum.

During the tenth century the king's enemies from the leading families, sometimes including his own family members, could often hope for a significant level of forbearance. Althoff went on to present several studies on conflict management and resolution during the twelfth and thirteenth centuries. Althoff's research has led him to conclude that the political structure of the Ottonian-Salian period in "Germania" was strikingly different both from the order established by the Carolingians and their heirs in West Francia and from that of the Staufer rulers in the twelfth and thirteenth centuries. The relatively harsh methods of punishment associated with the Carolingians, such as blinding, other physical mutilation or admission to a monastery, largely disappeared from the (German) empire. He has been able to detect the first breaks with this set of "rules of the conflict management game" back to the practices of Henry II. Henry II was not inclined to display the same leniency towards his enemies as his Ottonian precursors. Althoff attributes the major escalation of conflict under the later Salians, Henry IV and Henry V, to a "break with the old customs of conflict settlement". He bases this on his observation that "the king was himself trying to break away from the rules that constrained his ability to punish opponents". Subsequently, under the Staufer rulers, the guiding principle of leniency on the art of the kings was no longer to the fore, and the preferred measure for the effectiveness of government became the "rigor iusticiae" (the "forcefulness of the justice system").

Having started out by establishing the medieval "rules of the game for conflict management" with reference to conflicts between the king and leading members of the nobility, Althoff went on to research and recognize similar instances arising in disputes between members of the nobility, those between a king and a pope, and those between rulers of the increasingly dynamic city-states beyond the Alps, in Northern Italy. From this further work he inferred that the "rules" he had identified were actually more generally applicable as rules of conflict management. In view of the frequency with which conflicts in the tenth century were amicably settled through the agreed intervention of mediators, Althoff insists that the notion of the Middle Ages as one of "gun-toting feud-happy" conflict is only one part of what was in reality a much broader and more nuanced approach to conflict management and resolution.

=== Rituals, signs and symbols ===
Since the 1980s Althoff has been working on the importance of ritual for orderly rule in the Middle Ages. For him, "rites, rituals and other rules of the game, which taken together constitute medieval statehood", bound the empire together. At the same time, in London, Anglo-Saxon research on the political importance of rituals and signs was being undertaken by Althoff's near-contemporary Janet Nelson, a former doctoral student of the Cambridge Medievalist scholar, Walter Ullmann. Althoff organised conferences on communication, ritual and expressions of overlordship. He teamed up with Ernst Schubert (historian) to head up a three-day workshop meeting of the Konstanzer Arbeitskreis für mittelalterliche Geschichte during 22–25 March 1994, held on Reichenau, on the theme of "The expression of overlordship in Ottonian Saxony". Medievalists and art historians presented their research results in respect of the Ottonian heartlands in Saxony and of the forms and functions used to communicate overlordship during the Ottonian period In October 1996 and again in March 1997 further workshop meetings of the Konstanz Working Circle were dedicated to the "form and function of public communication in the Middle Ages", generating and sharing further insights into the political systems of those times. By this time Althoff's approach was becoming increasingly mainstream. His research findings were no longer viewed by colleagues as mere anecdotal adornments to the more traditionally revered gleanings from a small number of surviving court documents, but as important evidential statements in their own right about the functioning of medieval kingship. This approach to research into historical rituals ties in with the increasingly widespread acceptance, during recent decades, of Cultural anthropology as an important element in the historian's tool-kit.

In 2003, Althoff bundled up a couple of decades of research into the centrality of rituals in the Ottonian quasi-state in a single volume, entitled appropriately "Die Macht der Rituale. Symbolik und Herrschaft im Mittelalter". By "rituals", the author explains in a footnote on page 13, he means "the chains of actions, symbols and indeed words ..., that are tied to an overall behavioural pattern, and through repetition achieve a reinforcing power of recognition". (Note: "...um Ketten von Handlungen, Gesten und auch Worten […], die Mustern verpflichtet sind, sie wiederholen und so einen Wiedererkennungseffekt erzielen".) Althoff's book nevertheless restricted itself to the East and West Frankish kingdoms. Althoff was, in addition, very clear just how "preliminary and in need of elaboration" his results remained. He saw his own published research as an "interim balance sheet ... in a long-term effort adequately to understand and describe the operation and structures of medieval overlordship".

The extent to which he dealt with the earlier Middle Ages remained limited. For the Merovingian period he imputes relatively little significance to the place of "ritual". He writes of "modest beginnings ... to the curtailment of the king's power ... still very little circumscribed by ritual procedures and processes". Althoff picks out the meeting between the pope and King Pepin at Ponthion in 754 as a milestone, not simply in terms of its obvious political consequences for the enduring power relationship centred on the papacy and what became the Holy Roman empire, but also in terms of "the development of Frankish ritual culture". In the ninth and tenth centuries which followed he identified a growing "need for ritual procedures". This led, in the tenth and eleventh centuries, to a "broadening of ritual behaviour patterns". The tenth and eleventh centuries were indeed the principal focus of the book. Althoff observed wryly that the ritual of royal self-humiliation introduced by Henry IV came to a "somewhat abrupt end" with the so-called "walk to" Canossa. Althoff attached decisive importance to the events in Canossa: "... the effect of the events in Canossa was enduring. Not the least of its consequences was undoubtedly a reconfiguration of ritual behaviour patterns". The king's voluntary self-subordination could indeed be presented at a symbolic illustration of subordination to the pope. But due to the numerous subsequent accusations that the king had failed to stand by his agreements, ritual statements were seen to lose their power to bind the parties. Althoff's book was critically reviewed in Historische Zeitschrift by Hanna Vollrath, who complained that the author was purporting to "explain general shifts from one specific ritual event".

Althoff's extensive research into the medieval "rules of the political game" and rituals found their way repeatedly into his 1996 biography of Otto III. The king himself was consigned firmly to a supporting role. Althoff expressed his scepticism over whether it could or would ever be possible to capture in a book the individual personality of any medieval ruler. Instead, he wrote that he wanted to use the biography format as a vehicle for a "source-oriented description of the framework and constraints surrounding medieval kingship, using the example of Otto III". Althoff's idiosyncratic approach to biography attracted criticism from a number of academic commentators who found its underlying premise unpersuasive. Michael Borgolte was critical that in "tying up Ottonian kingship in customs and rituals", Althoff had lost sight of the personality of Otto III, identified in its titles as the subject of the book. Franz-Reiner Erkens had similar criticisms.

More criticism of Althoff's researches on the centrality of medieval rituals came from Philippe Buc (then Professor at Stanford). Buc found it inappropriate to use twentieth century theories derived from Social science and Anthropology as prisms through which to view early medieval source narratives. For Buc, medieval rituals were deliberate constructs, the realities of which were unknowable and unprovable. He called for a proper (and greater) account to be taken of the contextual connection between sources and their authors' intentions. The newly developed (and increasingly accepted) concept of "medieval ritual" was excessively dependent on a superficial understanding of early medieval sources. In a later review of Gerd Althoff, Die Macht der Rituale (Darmstadt, 2004), Buc underscored despite differences Althoff's pathbreaking work.

=== Ottonian historiography ===
Another recurring focus of Althoff's work is the source-value of Ottonian historiography. Like Johannes Fried at Frankfurt, he used Ottonian historiography as an opportunity to assess the distorting impact of oral transmission on the written historiographical records dating from (in this instance) the tenth century. According to Fried, those distortions were so powerful that the events on which the resulting written sources were based were "never identical with the actual events". Widukind of Corvey's Res gestae Saxonicae, widely seen as among the most important contemporary historical sources on the Ottonian period, was condemned by Fried as "saturated with errors". Althoff came to a completely different set of conclusions on Widukind's dependability. He insisted that there were particularly good reasons to place trust in the Res gestae Saxonicae, on account of its dedication to Matilda, the teenage daughter of Otto the Great who in 967/968, when the work was completed, was the only member of the imperial family north of the Alps. In this context Althoff inferred a clear didactic motive on the part of Widukind: "... to make the emperor's young daughter politically capable". From what was written, Matilda could see which men she was going to be dealing with, how the histories of the leading families had shaped current relationships, and what conflicts each had fought with the Ottonians. That this was a core purpose of the Res gestae Saxonicae was also apparent, according to Althoff, from the simple weighting of the book. Rather than giving equal weight to all the significant "deeds of the Saxons", the entire Italian policy was confined to a single chapter, while the missionary policy to the east and the complex negotiations after 955 that led, in 968, to the establishment of the Archbishopric of Magdeburg received no mention. From this selective approach, Althoff concluded, "the key witness [Widukind] is trustworthy".

Building his argument, Althoff contends that in tenth century Ottonian historiography the liberty to change the "accepted version of truth" was severely restricted in respect of any issues in which the self-defined "good and great" had an interest. Changes made at the discretion of the chronicler were not possible. It was certainly the case, however, that the "accepted version of truth" might contain whitewashing and emphases that were incorporated to satisfy the expectations of the "good and great". Althoff asked about the problems that had triggered the creation of a piece of historiographocal work, and from his conclusions on that point he inferred "a connection between actual concerns at the time when the work was produced and the resulting motives and objectives of the author(s)". It was, he pointed out, often crisis situations that prompted religious communities to produce hagiographies and historiographies. Numerous anecdotes, dreams and visions, frequently included in tenth century historiography, carry an argumentative kernel of criticism against the powerful. Althoff demonstrated that in the historical writings produced at the great monetaries of Quedlinburg and Gandersheim, open criticism of the rulers appeared in instances where rulers had not properly look after the interests of the religious. He was also able to adduce the results of new research findings, such as those drawn from various types of "memorial sources" and conflict resolution research.

== Gerd Althoff and Johannes Fried ==
Indications emerged during the 1990s that there was more to the differences between Gerd Althoff and Johannes Fried at Frankfurt than a mere disagreement on the value of certain tenth century sources on Ottonian history. In 1995, Althoff published a review of Fried's book, published the previous year, "Der Weg in die Geschichte" which, in the words of one commentator, purported to depict the "beginnings of German history .... often a contentious theme". Althoff's review triggered a broader dispute on the role of imagination and "fantasy" in the work of a historian. Althoff challenged the academic seriousness of the book. He criticised what he saw as Fried's tendency, in the book, to place excessive confidence in certain sources leading to predetermined conclusions and found the overall style of the book "decidedly suggestive". He complained that Fried had failed to make clear the frontier between "speculation" and "embellishments and imaginings". Althoff also indicated that he had detected regression from conclusions to selected evidence (rather than the logical sequence involving progression from evidence to conclusions) was evident in his complaint of what he described as Fried's tendency to impute motives from facts. He also made the criticism that Fried was including significant statements that were not covered by any sources, which was a particular problem when dealing with times and places for which few sources were available. The unverifiability of these statements meant that their use violated a basic ground rule of academic research. Althoff's stinging attack appeared in issue 260 of Historische Zeitschrift and covered eleven pages. Fried's rebuttal of it appeared in the same edition of the journal and covered twelve pages. Althoff, he asserted, had been ripping his "quotes out of context" and imputing to him statements which did not appear in the book. Althoff's own contribution involved coming up with nothing but hypotheses, never arriving at any reliable conclusions. Althoff, he indicated, only regarded historical conclusions as valid if they were his own - branded by Fried as "Althoffiana" - and was neither able nor willing to countenance any other viewpoint. Other historians joined in: there were, however, few who were prepared to criticise Fried or his book in so sharp a manner. Peter Moraw, Franz-Reiner Erkens and Arnold Esch (historian) were all supportive of Fried's position. Hanna Vollrath commended the book as "history writing in the best sense". Michael Borgolte, also impressed, found it "at the same time a work both of modern and postmodern history writing", and "the representative work on medieval history of our time".

Another point of contention between Althoff and Fried involved the latter's interpretation of the elevation in status of the Piast Bolesław I at the elaborately choreographed (and suibsequently much disputed between historians) Gnesen meeting between Bolesław and the emperor, which took place in the year 1000. In 1989, Fried set forward the thesis that the Gnesen meeting represented the limitation of an uprising by Bolesław (subsequently viewed in mainstream Polish sources as the first King of Poland) to an essentially pragmatic acknowledgement of acts that had already taken place on the ground. In his 1996 biography of Otto III Althoff set forward a contrasting image of Gnesen as an exceptionally honourable demonstration, sealing a friendship alliance between emperor and king. The traditional actions - the exchange of gifts and the demonstration of unity through several days of feasting - were common features of early medieval friendship ritual.

Differences between Althoff and Fried were again on display following Fried's re-evaluation of the emperor's so-called "Canossa Humiliation", published in 2008, and still attracting attention in the press in 2009. Althoff rejected Fried's intperpretation of Canossa as a form of peace treaty between the emperor and the pope. He asserted that Fried's view was based on "misunderstandings and selective choice of traditions". Other historians were also critical of Fried's reinterpretation of Canossa. Fried reacted a few years later by restating his view of Canossa in more detail and, despite a stated intention to back his arguments "Sine ira et studio" in a style that others found polemical. Those who disagreed with his position were not identified by name - other than in the footnotes - because he did not wish to "cheapen" the debate. Fried quoted Althoff directly, but without identifying him by name, instead referring merely to a "former author" ("... damals-Autor"). Althoff waited until 2014 before going into print with a further refutation of Fried's thesis that the Canossa was no more than a ritualised of peace treaty. He had collected fresh evidence which reflected an alternative official understanding on the part of the papacy. According to this research, the king-emperor was under an absolute duty of obedience to the pope. And disobedience would constitute a heresy: that would trigger exclusion from the Community of Believers. Althoff concluded that this uncompromising policy on the part of the pope with regard to the king and the princes precluded any possibility of Henry having concluded some sort of interim political alliance with the pope without informing the princes.

== Impact ==
Based on his own research during and since the 1980s, Gerd Althoff has played a central role in the re-evaluation of kingship in the Early and High Middle Ages. He has done this through his analysis of conflicts among leading families, his observations on the political significance of social networks in the period, his research into rituals and his conclusions on the central importance of co-operation and consultation in the political process. According to David Warner rituals and ceremonies have now become part of the "mainstream of virtually every area of historical scholarship". Hans-Werner Goetz went further in 2003, asserting that early medieval kingship was principally defined by ritual and the symbolism of overlordship (Note: "... vor allem durch Rituale und Herrschaftsrepräsentation geprägt") During recent decades a whole succession of historical works has been published covering processions, the interactions and meetings of rulers, burial cerminies and other ritualised activities.

Althoff's interest on the Medieval "political rules of the game" was not just taken up by German medievalists. The themes were also increasingly researched and discussed between mainstream Anglo-Saxon and French medievalists. Althoff's articles also found their way into American standard works. During the early part of the twentieth century English language versions of several of his contributions were published. Althoff's research was generally well received internationally among specialist medievalist literary critics. His contributions served to intensify and enrich the dialogue between Literary Historians and Medievalist scholars, concerning medieval sources and literary texts. His research results on medieval rituals and symbols, conflict management and resolution, and on "political rules of the game" have provide the starting point for numerous studies in Medieval Literature. Significant numbers of legal historians, on the other hand have vehemently rejected Althoff's conclusions that downplay the central role traditionally accorded by medievalists to records involving the law, court processes and trial verdicts.

Althoff's former students have sustained the research focus on the representations of Medieval Lordship, and on the role of symbolism in communication and conflict. His precepts have also been applied to the interpretation of political conflict in later centuries. In 1997, Monika Suchan applied Althoff's "political rules of the game" to the so-called Investiture Controversy of the eleventh and twelfth centuries. Hermann Kamp published research on the role of mediators in conflict resolution through the entire Middle Ages. Steffen Krieb concerned himself with the conflict resolution aspects of the so-called "German throne dispute" (1198-1215). Claudia Garnier chose to concentrate more directly on political networking in the later Middle Ages, as well as on conflict resolution and mediation/arbitration. She investigated the consequences of the increasing tendency for the "political rules of the game" to be written out during the period. Written agreements became more common after the twelfth century. But written documents did not replace important symbolic actions. Instead they supplemented the ritual aspects by spelling out in writing those details that could not be adequately defined through symbolic actions alone. Garnier also tackled the history of the political petitions. In doing this, she took account both of Althoff's "political rules of the game" and of the part that petitions played in political communication between rulers and other top echelons in the polity. Christiane Witthöft received her doctorate in 2002 for work on "Forms of Symbolic Communication in the Historiography and Literature of the Late Middle Ages". In 2005 Theo Broekmann published his research conclusions on the invoking of rituals to settle conflicts between rules and nobility in the eleventh and twelfth century Kingdom of Sicily. Broekmann was able to show that the obligation that kings north of the Alps demonstrated to the supposedly Chrisitan virtues of "Clementia" and "Misericordia" played no part in the treatment of defeated rebels in Sicily. Instead, the Staufer kings relied on Norman traditions which meant conducting conflicts through brutality and strength, with a powerful sense of "king's justice" to the fore.
