= Carl Muth =

German writer and publisher

Carl Muth

Karl Borromäus Johann Baptist Muth (also Carl) (31 January 1867, Worms – 15 November 1944, Bad Reichenhall) was a German writer and publisher, best known for founding and editing the religious and cultural magazine Hochland.

== Biography ==
Muth attended the gymnasium in Worms from 1877 to 1881. With the intention of becoming a missionary, he attended the school of the Steyler Missionaries from 1882 to 1884 and the missionary school in Algiers of the White Fathers from 1884 to 1885. He undertook military service in Mainz in 1890 and 1891, then studied for a year at the University of Berlin, taking classes in philosophy, history, and literature. He studied history and art in Paris (1892–1893) and Rome (1893), began writing for the Mainzer Journal, and befriended Georges Goyau. In 1894, he became editor at the newspaper Der Elsässer in Strasbourg, and he married Anna Thaler from Fulda in the same year. From 1895 to 1902 he worked as editor at the Catholic monthly family magazine Alte und Neue Welt.

Prompted by a public debate over the "inferiority of German Catholics," Muth began publishing on Catholic literature; furthermore, he began to call for an end to the confessionalism that remained from the Kulturkampf, with its attendant narrow-minded morality, apathy, and prudery. Under the influence of Martin Deutinger, he emphasized the interaction between religion and art and maintained that a decrease in religious awareness also entailed a decrease in art's creativity. Muth's main accomplishment was founding and then editing Hochland, a magazine with a "supraconfessional" group of contributors, writing on sciences, poetry, arts, and music. The magazine soon attained a leading status in Catholic spiritual life. During World War I, he defended German culture, and after the war Hochland attacked the primitivism and nihilism of Nazism; throughout the 1930s the magazine spoke out, partly covertly, against the perversion of (Christianity-derived) justice and the destruction of societal order.

After Hochland was definitively banned in 1941, Muth successfully managed to avoid being arrested in connection with the White Rose. He died alone in a hospital in Bad Reichenhall.

== Patriotism and Christianity ==
Muth, whom historian David Blackbourn calls a "self-conscious Catholic modernist," was a patriot, though he never claimed to be a nationalist, and, in a defense of Germany's involvement in World War I, said: "Our ambition is not rooted in a conceited belief that we are fit and destined to lord it over the globe. Our heart is not set on industrial subjugation or commercial supremacy. We simply have a keen inborn sense that mother nature has made us a many-sided and objective sort of folk. We think we have a duty to ripen in ourselves a humanity that shall unite in harmony the several forces and faculties. A limited, self-centred, bigoted nationalism is foreign to our deeper character....The idea of universalism, catholicity, and world-embracing solidarity is essentially Christian. There is a natural kinship, then, between Christianity and German universalism."

== Hochland ==
Muth founded Hochland in 1903 and edited it from 1903 to 1932 and again from 1935 to 1939. Hochland, a Catholic magazine devoted to religion and culture, loosened its strictly confessional attitude and became under his direction a forum for dialogue with other denominations and even with secular thinkers. The articles he published were to elucidate how art and aesthetics could influence politics and religions, and they never followed any party's line; Among his "friends", those authors who published regularly on Hochland, were such notables people as Theodor Haecker, Ruth Schaumann, Gertrud von Le Fort, Werner Bergengruen Sigrid Undset, Stefan Andres, Eugen Rosenstock-Huessy, Romano Guardini, Max Scheler, Carl Schmitt (until 1930), Peter Wust, and Theodor Schieffer.

== Influences ==
Muth, personally and through Hochland, influenced Gertrud von Le Fort, and Hans and Sophie Scholl, who rented a room in his house.

== Bibliography ==
- Ackermann, Konrad. "Hochland. Monatsschrift für alle Gebiete des Wissens, der Literatur und Kunst". Historisches Lexikon Bayerns (in German).
- Axelrod, Toby (2001). Hans and Sophie Scholl: German Resisters of the White Rose. Rosen. p. 53. ISBN 978-0-8239-3316-7.
- Winfried Becker (1993). "Carl Muth". In Bautz, Traugott (ed.). Biographisch-Bibliographisches Kirchenlexikon (BBKL) (in German). Vol. 6. Herzberg: Bautz. cols. 396–402. ISBN 3-88309-044-1.
- Blackbourn, David (2003). History of Germany, 1780-1918: the long nineteenth century. Wiley-Blackwell. ISBN 978-0-631-23196-7.
- Gottfried, Paul (1990). Carl Schmitt. Continuum. ISBN 978-1-870626-46-0.
- Grosse, Rolf (2007). "Theodor Schieffer: Ein rheinischer Historiker und seine 'Begegnung mit der romanisch-französischen Welt'". In Ulrich Pfeil (ed.). Das Deutsche Historische Institut Paris und seine Gründungsväter: ein personengeschichtlicher Ansatz. Oldenbourg Wissenschaftsverlag. pp. 119–38. ISBN 978-3-486-58519-3.
- McBrien, Richard P.; Harold W. Attridge (1995). The HarperCollins encyclopedia of Catholicism. HarperCollins. p. 616. ISBN 978-0-06-065338-5.
- Muth, Karl (1916). "Ideal Humanity Interpreted in German Thought and Art". In George Pfeilschifter (ed.). German culture catholicism and the world war: a defense against the book, La guerre allemande et le catholicisme. Wanderer. pp. 379–95.
- Schmitt, Carl (1988). Ellen Kennedy (ed.). The crisis of parliamentary democracy. MIT Press. ISBN 978-0-262-69126-0.
- Zankel, Sönke (2008). Mit Flugblättern gegen Hitler: der Widerstandskreis um Hans Scholl und Alexander Schmorell. Böhlau Verlag. ISBN 978-3-412-20038-1.
- Ziolkowski, Theodore (2007). Modes of faith: secular surrogates for lost religious belief. U of Chicago P. ISBN 978-0-226-98363-9.
