= Veit Arnpeck =

Bavarian historian (c. 1440–1496)

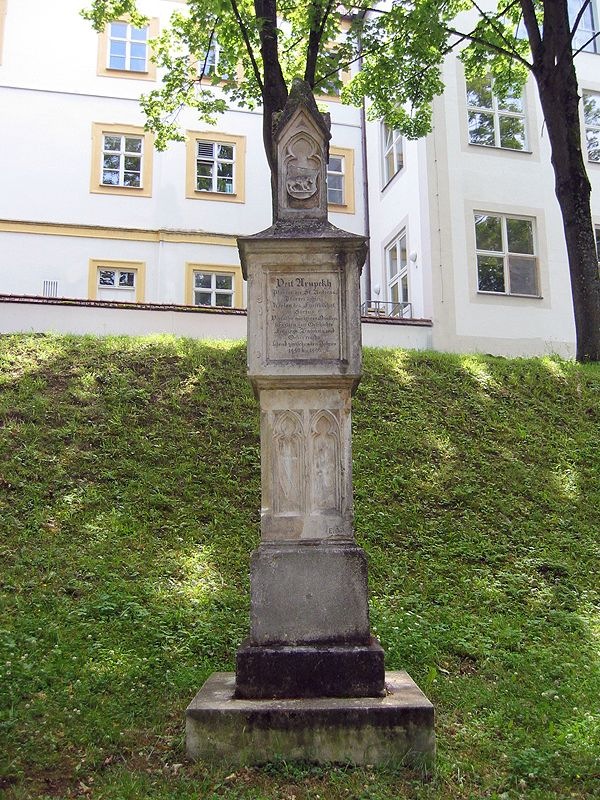
Momorial of Veit Arnpeck among others, in front of Domburg

Veit Arnpeck (c. 1440 in Freising – 1496 in Landshut) was a Bavarian historian. He was educated at Amberg and Vienna and later became parish priest of St. Martin's Church, Landshut and chaplain to Bishop Sixtus. He is considered a significant figure in the development of Bavarian historiography and was praised by Johannes Aventinus (Aventin) as one of his most important predecessors. His works include Chronicon Austriacum down to 1488 (Pez, Script. rer. Austr., I, 1165), Liber de gestis episcoporum Frisingensium (Deutinger, Beitr. z. Gesch. d. Erzbisth. Munch.-Fries., III), and the Chronicon Baioariorum (Pez, Thesaurus, III, ii, 19 sq.).

Arnpeck died early 1496 in Landshut, and with reasonable certainty the cause of death was the plague.
