= Peter Moraw =

German historian

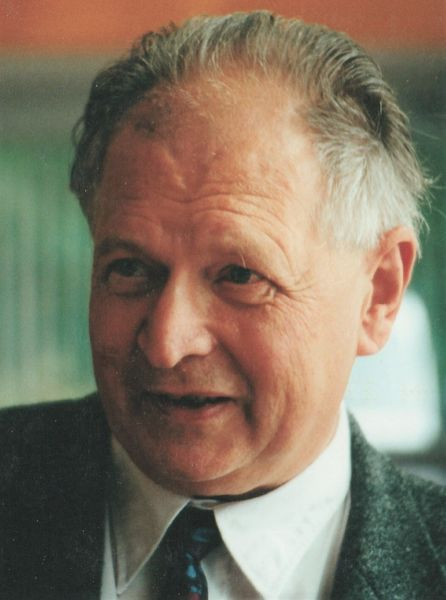
Moraw in 2003

Peter Moraw (31 August 1935 – 8 April 2013) was a German historian. He served as a professor of Medieval History, German Regional History, and Economic and Social History at the University of Giessen until his retirement in 2003. Moraw's work in the latter half of the 20th century had a significant impact on research related to the Late Middle Ages in Germany. He is recognized for integrating social sciences and prosopography into medieval studies, as well as for his focus on structural history and social history in the context of university history. His volume on the late medieval period, From an Open Constitution to a Designed Consolidation of the Propylaea, History of Germany, became a key reference in the field.

== Life ==
Peter Moraw was born on 31 August 1935 in Moravská Ostrava, Czechoslovakia. After World War II, he fled to Heidelberg with his parents and graduated from high school there in 1955. He studied history, German, and Latin at Heidelberg University from 1955 to 1960, intending to become a teacher. He passed the state examination for teaching at grammar schools in 1960. From 1961 to 1971, he worked as a research assistant at the Institute for Franconian-Palatinate History and Regional Studies at Heidelberg University. His experiences in Moravia and Heidelberg significantly shaped his research interests in the Late Middle Ages. Influenced by historians such as Reinhart Koselleck, Moraw adopted interdisciplinary methods. Moraw named Werner Conze, Erich Maschke, Ahasver von Brandt, and Hermann Heimpel as the historians who influenced him. He completed his doctorate under Fritz Ernst in 1961 with a thesis on the St. Philipp Abbey in Zell, chosen for its accessible documents in the university archives. By the standards of the time, the dissertation had a "classical-land-historical approach". Initially taking a classical historical approach, Moraw later expanded his methodology to include individual history and prosopography, informed by his study of works by Helmut Berve and the Tellenbach school. These works served as a catalyst for his development of a more nuanced understanding of pre-modern conditions, based on a prosopographical approach.

In the ten years following his dissertation, Peter Moraw was a habilitation fellow of the German Research Foundation (DFG). During this time, he explored university history, translated key sources on the life and canonization of Hedwig of Silesia, and created a detailed map of monasteries and convents for the Palatinate Atlas. He completed his habilitation in medieval and modern history at Heidelberg University in 1971, with a thesis titled König, Reich und Territorium im späten Mittelalter (King, Empire and Territory in the Late Middle Ages), which, while unpublished, contributed to several studies on topics such as King Rupert of the Palatinate and Charles IV. He delivered his habilitation lecture on 17 July 1971, at the University of Heidelberg on the subject of Hessian collegiate churches in the Middle Ages. In 1971, Moraw became a deputy professor of medieval history at the Technical University of Darmstadt.

In 1972, he was appointed Professor of General History with a focus on auxiliary historical sciences at Bielefeld University. From the summer semester of 1973, he took on the role of Professor of Medieval History and German Regional History at the University of Giessen, where he worked closely with early modern scholar Volker Press. At the beginning of the 1980s, Moraw, Press, and the sociologist Helge Pross offered courses at the University of Giessen.

Moraw declined offers from universities in Düsseldorf, Trier, and Tübingen. He served as Dean of the Department of History and Vice Dean at various times and co-founded the DFG Research Training Group on Medieval and Modern Statehood in Giessen in 1992. He also helped establish the DFG's Collaborative Research Center on Cultures of Memory in 1997. He became emeritus in the summer semester of 2003 and delivered his farewell address on the empire in medieval Europe on 23 July 2003.

Moraw was married in 1964 and had two daughters, including classical archaeologist Susanne Moraw. His wife died in 1997, and due to a long illness, he was unable to participate in academic activities in the years leading up to his death on 8 April 2013.

== Main research areas ==
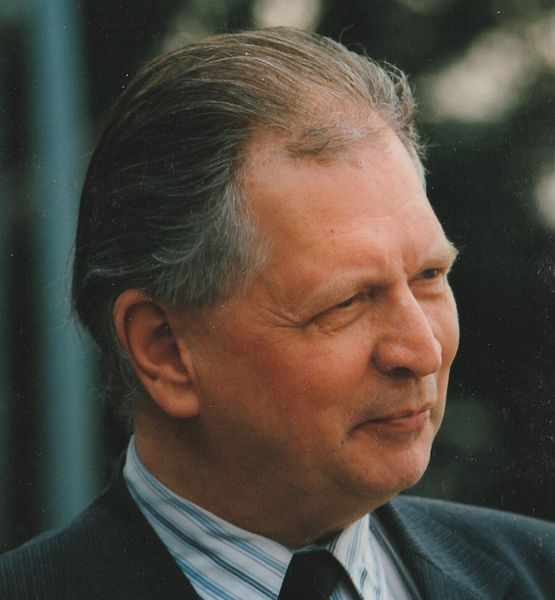
Peter Moraw 1998, photographed by Werner Maleczek

Peter Moraw's research focused on the constitutional history of the German Late Middle Ages, social history, German regional history from the Middle Ages to modern times, and the history of universities and education in those periods. He published nine standalone works and over 200 essays, articles, and contributions to handbooks and encyclopedias. His work significantly enhanced the understanding of the Late Middle Ages, a period that had been relatively understudied. From 1987, he served as a co-editor and advisor for the Lexikon des Mittelalters, writing numerous articles on topics such as Germany in the Late Middle Ages, Charles IV, and the Imperial Diet.

=== Development of new approaches since the 1970s ===
Since the 1970s, historians Peter Moraw and Volker Press have identified a gap in historical scholarship related to the integration of imperial and regional history. In 1977, Moraw introduced a method aimed at addressing this issue by proposing a constitutional-historical territorial grammar. This approach aimed to identify and analyze recurring situations and processes that shape the evolution of political territories, focusing on personal relationships, the dynasty, and the interactions between the king and the territories. Concerning the "personal relationships", the dynasty, the relationship between the king and the realm on the one hand and the territories on the other, as well as the territorial constitution, there were four aspects under which a "territorial grammar" could be written in the sense of "historical rule or reference systems." Moraw and Press argued that separating royal actions from territorial developments hindered the understanding of political complexities. They sought to expand constitutional and political history to include social history, moving beyond the traditional institutional model of the Old Kingdom to develop a more nuanced view of the late medieval and early modern period. They initiated a program for the structural analysis of the imperial body, placing the king and emperor as central figures in the empire's legitimacy. Their goal was to create a political-structural map of the empire that combined social and constitutional history by examining institutions like the Imperial Diet and the Imperial Judiciary, as well as their political supporters. This project aimed for a synthesis of constitutional and socio-historical perspectives, with the long-term goal of achieving a unified understanding of the Holy Roman Empire.

Moraw shifted away from classical constitutional and administrative history, believing that institutions were shaped by individuals. He rejected the term "civil servants," preferring to describe those who wielded money and power in their roles as "co-entrepreneurs." He argued that understanding personal relationships and associations was crucial for making meaningful statements about institutions.

==== From "open constitution" to "designed densification" ====
In 1989, Peter Moraw published a comprehensive overview of German history from the 13th to 15th centuries as part of the Propylaea History of Germany series. This was the first extensive treatment of the period since Hermann Heimpel's work, Germany in the Later Middle Ages, which was published in 1938 and revised in 1957. Moraw characterized the evolution of the empire as a shift from an "open constitution" to a "designed consolidation." He defined the "open constitution" as a legacy of the defeat of the Hohenstaufen dynasty, where institutional participation was minimal, and only a select few engaged in the empire's power dynamics. In contrast, Moraw argued that the "designed consolidation" arose from new challenges at the end of the Middle Ages, such as the rise of the Habsburg dynasty and the establishment of an institutional dualism among the imperial estates, culminating in the Imperial Diet. This marked a period where the great dynasty and the estates became mutually dependent.

==== Relationship between central and local powers ====
Peter Moraw conducted numerous studies on the spatial and power structure of the empire, particularly during the time of Charles IV. In 1982, he emphasized the need for research into the mechanisms of political rule in the late medieval empire for a better understanding of its governance. In a 1987 essay, he questioned how a large empire could function with limited resources and personnel, suggesting that administrative history should incorporate methods of personal historical research. Moraw argued that at the end of the Middle Ages, the empire was not an abstract state but rather a polycentric structure of regions with varying levels of development and proximity to the king. He identified three main zones within the empire: the hereditary lands, regions close to the king, and those further away with minimal contribution to the royal court. He further divided the empire into six areas based on the territories of the reigning king, rival dynasties, and electors, along with landscapes categorized by their closeness to the king. Unlike other scholars, Moraw placed less emphasis on rulers' itineraries. was of secondary importance for Moraw. With regard to Franconia, Moraw defined "proximity to the king" in terms of persons such as "royal servants" and "royal partners". He defined "proximity to the king" through roles such as "royal servants" and "royal partners." He also observed that the northern Alpine empire, particularly in the late 14th century, could be divided into fourteen largely self-sufficient regions.

Peter Moraw approached the history of territories and regions from the perspective of kingship. In several essays, he argued that late medieval kingship did not equally encompass all landscapes of the empire. He categorized the empire into zones, distinguishing between areas "close to the king" and those "distant from the king". "Close to the king" included regions such as Franconia with Nuremberg, the Middle Rhine-Upper Main region with Frankfurt, parts of Swabia centered in Augsburg, and to a lesser extent, the Middle Elbe-Saale region. He viewed the Upper Rhine and, to a lesser extent, the Lower Rhine as "open to the king," while he considered the territories of rival dynasties and non-royal electors as "politically distant from the king." The northern part of the empire and the Romanesque west and southwest were also geographically remote from the king.

In his 1987 essay, "On Developmental Differences and Developmental Equalization in the German and European Middle Ages", Moraw proposed a developmental model highlighting a cultural divide between west-east and south-north. He suggested that this divide ran through the medieval empire, with regions like Germania Slavica, located mainly along the Baltic Sea, being particularly disadvantaged. He argued that a balance was only achieved by the end of the Middle Ages. Moraw also introduced a model for understanding the varying stages of development in Europe, based on the influence of Roman antiquity, which significantly affected southern and western Europe ("older Europe") but had limited impact in central, northern, and eastern Europe ("younger Europe"). This model has been applied to explain differences between European universities as well.

Peter Moraw advocated for greater incorporation of dynastic considerations in the study of late medieval constitutional and social history. He viewed dynastic actions as central to political dynamics, stating that kings often prioritized dynastic interests before considering their territories and the empire. He classified dynasties into categories such as "great dynasties," "secondary powers," "middle powers," and principalities with limited political influence. This classification faced criticism from Karl-Heinz Spiess, who noted the challenges in measuring the "capacity to act". Moraw expressed a preference for great dynasties and centralizing tendencies, considering them crucial to German history. He described the period from the interregnum to the early 14th century as one of relative stagnation in constitutional development. He characterized the late medieval rulers during this time, from Rudolf of Habsburg to Henry VII, as "small kings" by European standards, noting their modest power and underdeveloped means of governance. He characterized Sigismund's reign as one of "exertion and excessive demands. For Moraw, the princes were mostly underpowered and had little or no room for maneuver within the late medieval imperial structure.

He regarded Charles IV highly, considering him the "greatest ruler of the German late Middle Ages" and his reign as a peak of royal power. Moraw also viewed Charles IV's chancellery as a significant achievement in the administrative history of the late medieval empire.

==== Court and Imperial Diet research ====
Peter Moraw utilized prosopography in his research to explore social dynamics such as clientelism, patronage, kinship, and friendship within late medieval chancelleries and courts. He argued that kingship should be understood through the relationships among individuals rather than through institutions. In his analysis of the court of the Roman-German kings from Rudolf of Habsburg to Frederick III, he identified 230 learned jurists.

Moraw engaged in a scholarly discourse with Friedrich Battenberg, whose dissertation in 1974 examined the institutionalization of the court and its relationship to the king. Battenberg proposed that the court had become largely independent from the king by 1430 due to professionalization, a view Moraw considered too modern and anachronistic.

In the 1980s, Moraw shifted his focus to research on the Imperial Diet. In his 1980 essay on its origins, he historicized the imperial assemblies, noting that they took on an institutional form only in the late 15th century. He argued that the term "Imperial Diet" did not appear in sources until after 1495. Moraw advocated for a critical examination of source materials related to 15th-century imperial dietary records, suggesting that earlier compilations had significantly shaped the understanding of the Imperial Diet.

Moraw made notable contributions to the study of the German royal court in the late Middle Ages. He argued that medieval imperial assemblies should not be viewed as modern representative bodies and noted that the Imperial Diet at the end of the 15th century functioned as a court day—a meeting between the king and his supporters—distinct from the ruler's daily court. In 1992/93, he organized a conference on the German royal court and the Imperial Diet, focusing primarily on constitutional and social history. The discussions addressed the modernization of rule, legal legitimacy, and the cultural-political significance of the court and the Imperial Diet. Moraw's work suggested that the court had evolved from being the central political authority to an important aspect of the ruler's public life and influence.

=== University history ===
Peter Moraw was recognized as an expert in university history, a field he engaged with for over five decades. His dissertation addressed aspects of university history, specifically highlighting the financial support of Heidelberg University by the Palatine monastery of St. Philipp zu Zell after the Reformation. His first publication on this topic appeared in 1961, and his final work was published in 2007. As an academic teacher, he supervised nine doctoral dissertations and two postdoctoral theses on university history.

Unlike earlier research that focused on legal sources to describe university operations. In contrast to earlier scholarship, Moraw focused on individuals rather than institutions. Moraw emphasized individual and socio-historical aspects, offering new insights into late medieval and early modern universities. He co-authored an article for the 575th anniversary of Heidelberg University, revealing connections between the university and the town of Neustadt an der Haardt through a list of students.

In a 1975 essay, he advocated for incorporating social history into university history research, using personal and social data to analyze groups within their political, social, and cultural contexts. He drew on social science approaches earlier explored by scholars like Lawrence Stone and Jacques Le Goff. Moraw viewed universities as important centers of personal relationships.

The 375th anniversary of the University of Giessen in 1982 spurred Peter Moraw to engage in a more in-depth study of the university's history. His work, Kleine Geschichte der Universität Gießen (1607-1982), first published in 1982 and updated in 1990, remains the only comprehensive account of the university's history. In this monograph, he emphasized social history, earning the Justus Liebig University Prize in 1983 for his contributions. Moraw approached the history of universities from a cross-epochal perspective, distinguishing three dimensions of university history research: institutional, scientific, and environmental. He advocated for placing universities within their broader contexts and proposed developing a social history of the university. He illustrated this by examining the relationship between the University of Heidelberg and the court of the Count Palatine.

He was also a notable expert on the history of Charles University in Prague, publishing a significant account of its history from its founding in 1347/48 to 1417/19, focusing on constitutional and social history. He studied the Prague Faculty of Law from the perspective of constitutional and social history. Moraw studied various German and Central European universities and, along with Rainer Christoph Schwinges, initiated the Repertorium Academicum Germanicum. This research project, running from 2001 to 2019, aims to document 64,000 scholars of the Old Kingdom between 1250 and 1550, integrating institutional, social, and cultural history to create a comprehensive understanding of scholars in pre-modern society.

=== Collegiate churches ===
Peter Moraw's early research on collegiate churches began with his dissertation on St. Philipp Abbey in Zell, which examined its foundation, internal and external conditions, ownership, and eventual decline. This work received positive feedback from scholars. In 1964 and 1965, he published two essays in the Archive for Middle Rhine Church History that stemmed from his dissertation, one focusing on the challenges faced by the small collegiate monastery of St. Fabian in Hornbach, and the other addressing issues of patronage related to St. Philipp in Zell. Moraw continued his research on collegiate churches through comparative studies and critical reviews rather than additional monographs.

In 1977 and 1980, he published essays discussing Hessian and German collegiate churches, outlining typological, chronological, and geographical frameworks. He identified monasticism, episcopacy, and secular governance as key influences on collegiate church institutions and classified them into three types: monastic, episcopal, and lay foundations. Moraw emphasized the importance of studying collegiate churches as sites of interaction between church and society from the 9th to the 16th centuries, suggesting that traditional church-historical approaches could be minimized. He distinguished three foundational periods: the Carolingian-pre-Germanic period (816-900), the early German-archaic period (mid-10th to 11th century), and the Old European-territorial phase (13th century until the Reformation). He also posited that the study of collegiate churches and their endowments could reflect broader socio-economic developments in Germany and Europe.

=== Hessian state history ===
Peter Moraw's research on Hessian regional history aimed to address broader questions within the context of kingship. He approached regional history by examining the dynamics of the Holy Roman Empire, shifting his focus from the territory to the monarchy. This perspective emphasized political and social structures rather than demographic or environmental factors.

Moraw found the Landgraviate of Hesse particularly relevant for developing his theoretical concepts, integrating regional findings into a larger framework. In his essay on Hesse and German kingship, he noted the distance of the landgraviate from the kings. However, his models relied more on existing research than on extensive primary source analysis, leading some scholars, like Christine Reinle, to point out the limited source density in his works. While he did not initiate any editions of regional history, Moraw supervised many projects in Hessian regional history. He also played a key role in organizing the Hessian State Exhibition on Hesse and Thuringia in 1992 and delivered lectures on various topics related to Hessian history for organizations such as the Hessian Broadcasting Corporation and the Upper Hessian Historical Society.

== Scientific organization ==
=== Journal for Historical Research ===
From 1974, Peter Moraw served as a co-editor of the newly founded Journal of Historical Research. The editorial board introduced a new model of periodization, distinguishing the late Middle Ages from traditional medieval studies and merging it with the early modern period into an "Old European Era" (approximately the 12th to 18th or early 19th centuries). Moraw was responsible for the Late Middle Ages and held this position for over two decades. His review of selected essays by Alfons Lhotsky in the journal's first volume established a commitment to this period. He also emphasized personal history, notably in the second volume, where he addressed personal research and German kingship. Together with Volker Press, he introduced a research program focused on the social and constitutional history of the Holy Roman Empire during the late Middle Ages and early modern period. Moraw played a significant role in developing the journal's review section, with his last reviews appearing in 1993.

=== Residences Commission ===
Initiated by Hans Patze in the early 1980s, the residences project at the Göttingen Academy of Sciences included a critical review by Moraw in 1991, which questioned the commission's focus on topography and material culture. He advocated for a more in-depth investigation into dynasties and courts rather than solely residences. In response to his critiques, the Residences Commission began to prioritize court research alongside residence studies in 1991. Due to his insights and involvement in related conferences, Moraw was invited to join the commission and was elected as a member in October 1992. He later summarized key symposia and contributed to the Handbook with an article on King Ruprecht of the Palatinate.

=== Constance working group ===
Peter Moraw joined the Constance Working Group on Medieval History in 1983 after attending conferences and delivering lectures. He participated regularly in the group's activities, with few exceptions. In 1992 and 1993, he organized a double conference on the German Royal Court and Imperial Diet in the Late Middle Ages. In 1994, he succeeded Harald Zimmermann as chair. Under his leadership, the group became more inclusive of young scholars, and he encouraged topic suggestions from outside the group. Moraw also organized a conference on spatial recording and perception in the Late Middle Ages, helping to introduce the spatial turn as a research focus. He facilitated a change of venue for the conferences after the lease on their long-time location ended, securing a new site at the Archdiocese of Freiburg's family resort on Lake Constance, where the first conference was held in 1997.

In 2001, together with Rudolf Schieffer, a conference marking the 50th anniversary of the Constance Working Group, presenting on the developments in German-language medieval studies from 1945 to 1970. Moraw's participation in conferences continued until 2003, after which health issues limited his attendance.

=== Regesta Imperii ===
Peter Moraw's involvement with the Regesta Imperii was driven by his interest in personal historical questions and a desire to move beyond a strictly kingship-focused approach. He believed that the "completion, revision, and continuation of the Regesta Imperii" was essential. Paul-Joachim Heinig notes Moraw's contributions to the establishment of registers for Friedrich III, which included initiating a cooperation project with Evamaria Engel at the Central Institute for History of the German Academy of Sciences in Berlin in 1988. He played a key role in ensuring the project's continuation after the end of the GDR, integrating it into the newly founded Berlin-Brandenburg Academy of Sciences and Humanities (BBAW). As a full member of the BBAW, Moraw oversaw this area and was elected to the German Registers Commission in 1996. He supported efforts for a coordinated new edition of the Regesta Imperii of Charles IV and advocated for the integration of all Regesta Imperii files over the medium term.

== Awards and memberships ==
Peter Moraw received numerous awards and held memberships in various prestigious scholarly organizations throughout his career. He became a corresponding member of the Palatinate Society for the Promotion of Science in 1972 and joined the Hessian Historical Commission in 1973. He was a corresponding member of the Commission for Historical Regional Studies in Baden-Württemberg (1979), a member of the Association for Constitutional History (1981), and served as its vice-chairman from 1989 to 1997. Other memberships included the Collegium Carolinum Munich (1984), the Medieval Study Group of the Herzog August Library, and full membership in the Historical Commission of the Bavarian Academy of Sciences (1987). He also became a full member of the Berlin-Brandenburg Academy of Sciences (1996) and a member of the Commission for Research into the Culture of the Late Middle Ages of the Göttingen Academy of Sciences.

Since 1995 he has been a member of the Commission for the Editing of the Regesta Moraw was involved with the Constance Working Group for Medieval History from 1983 and served as its chairman from 1994 to 1998. He was a reviewer for the German Research Foundation (DFG) from 1986 to 1994 and was elected a full member of the Sudeten German Academy of Sciences and Arts in 1980. In 1993, he became a member of the Academia Europaea, and in 1998, he received the Medal of Honor from the University of Prague on its 650th anniversary. That same year, he joined the Central Directorate of the Monumenta Germaniae Historica and remained a member until 2006. In 1999, Moraw was awarded an honorary doctorate from the Catholic University of Eichstätt-Ingolstadt, and he was made an honorary member of the Upper Hessian Historical Society in 2007.

== Scientific repercussions ==
In medieval studies, the Late Middle Ages in Germany was previously viewed as a period marked by the decline of statehood at the imperial level. However, research by Peter Moraw and Ernst Schubert shifted this perspective, leading to a reassessment of the era. Moraw's students conducted significant studies on topics such as Sigmund's political system, the court of Frederick III, and university visitors in the late medieval empire, further advancing research into this period. This new interest reframed the Late Middle Ages as a time of progress and "modernizing condensation," moving away from the traditional narrative of decline. Moraw had characterized this "densification" primarily in institutional contexts, such as the Royal Court, Court Diet, and Imperial Diet, and more recent studies have extended this concept to other areas, including princely festivities, warfare, and courtly dress practices.

In personal history, Moraw's contributions have notably influenced collegiate church research, particularly in the work of Gerhard Fouquet on the Speyer cathedral chapter and the collegiate monastery of St. Michael in Pforzheim. Fouquet's two-volume study, published in 1987, aimed to explore the social and political networks in Speyer, examining the influences on the election of bishops and prelates. Oliver Auge continued Moraw's methodology in his dissertation, demonstrating Moraw's impact beyond collegiate studies. While Moraw viewed collegiate churches as intersections of church and society, scholars like Guy P. Marchal and Michael Borgolte have emphasized the internal development of the abbeys. Borgolte argued for a historical approach that highlights the self-image and religious roles of the canons, while Marchal depicted collegiate chapters as entrepreneurial institutions in their own right.

The model of "close to the king," "distant from the king," and "open to the king" has become a key framework for understanding the political structure of the late medieval empire and has been extended to the early modern period. Paul-Joachim Heinig has adjusted the thesis regarding the distance of the landgraves of Hesse from the king during the time of Landgrave Ludwig I. However, further studies indicate that Moraw's model may not fully capture political practices around 1470, as an individual's proximity to the king could change based on circumstances. Moraw's idea of a cultural divide in the empire and Europe is widely accepted, though Oliver Auge has revised this perspective for the Baltic region based on early urban centers, the monastic system, and Hanseatic trade.

Moraw's observations about the "smallness" of late medieval German kings, particularly Rupert of the Palatinate, continue to impact research. Heinz Thomas has questioned the characterization of Rudolph of Habsburg as a "small king", while Auge has investigated "minor" princes, highlighting their significance in the history of the Holy Roman Empire.

Moraw's work From Open Constitutions to Designed Compacts: The Empire in the Late Middle Ages 1250-1490 is regarded as a significant account of the period. Oliver Auge's study of the southern Baltic region confirmed Moraw's thesis about the consolidation of the late medieval German empire. Early modern historian Georg Schmidt suggested that Moraw's concept of "condensation" reflects a delayed yet distinct development in Germany compared to the West, concluding that this process culminated with the Peace of Augsburg in 1555, establishing a structure of multi-level statehood.

Moraw's socio-historical approach has gained acceptance in historical scholarship, significantly influencing recent research on the court. His view of the imperial court as a social structure rather than just an institution has been further explored in recent studies. This work on the Imperial Diet has shifted focus away from comparing it to modern parliamentary systems, leading to a better understanding of its actions and communications. Researchers like Gabriele Annas and Thomas Michael Martin have examined the imperial assemblies, emphasizing their role within the late medieval constitutional structure. Martin, in particular, highlighted the variety of assembly types and introduced the concept of "council days," which occurred without the king present.

In university history, socio-historical research has also seen growth, with scholars like Rainer Christoph Schwinges, Sylvia Paletschek, and Marian Füssel demonstrating the university's role as a site of social relations. The cultural-historical dimension—how universities and scholars are represented through symbols and rituals—has emerged as an important aspect of contemporary university historiography. Matthias Asche noted that Moraw had laid the groundwork for this dimension in earlier decades. In 2008, a collection of 18 of his works on university history was published.

In January 2014, a conference titled State and Perspectives of the Social and Constitutional History of the Roman and German Empire: Peter Moraw's Impact on German Medieval Studies was held in Gießen to honor Moraw. Bernd Schneidmüller noted that the focus on social and constitutional history in the Journal of Historical Research limited methodological innovation. He highlighted that developments in "cultural-historical Renaissance research" occurred outside the journal. Schneidmüller recognized Johannes Kunisch and Barbara Stollberg-Rilinger for their contributions to broadening the journal's topics, while not crediting Moraw. The new periodization proposed by the first editorial board of the Journal of Historical Research did not gain acceptance in the broader historical community. The concept of Ancient Europe, introduced in 1974, remains contentious, with only two of the 229 articles published between 1974 and 2011 using the term in their titles.

== Publications (selection) ==
Essay collections

- Collected contributions to German and European university history. Structures – Persons – Developments (= Education and society in the Middle Ages and Renaissance. Vol. 31). Brill, Leiden et al. 2008, ISBN 978-90-04-16280-8.
- Rainer Christoph Schwinges (Ed.): On King and Empire. Essays on the German constitutional history of the late Middle Ages. Essays on the occasion of Peter Moraw's 60th birthday on August 31, 1995. Thorbecke, Sigmaringen 1995, ISBN 3-7995-7076-4.

Monographies

- A brief history of the University of Giessen from its beginnings to the present day. 2nd edition. Ferber, Giessen 1990, ISBN 3-927835-00-5.
- From an Open Constitution to a Structured Consolidation. The Empire in the late Middle Ages 1250 to 1490 (= Propylaea History of Germany. Volume 3). Propyläen Publisher, Frankfurt am Main 1989, ISBN 3-548-04792-0.
- With Theodor Karst: The University of Heidelberg and Neustadt an der Haardt (= Publications on the history of the town and district of Neustadt an der Weinstraße. Volume 3). Published by the Historical Society of the Palatinate, Speyer 1963.
- The monastery of St. Philipp in Zell in der Pfalz. A contribution to medieval Church History (= Heidelberg Publications on Regional History and Regional Studies. Publication series of the Institute for Franconian-Palatinate History and Regional Studies. Volume 9). Winter, Heidelberg 1964 (also: Heidelberg, university, dissertation, 1961).

Editorships of anthologies

- with Rudolf Schieffer: German-language Medieval Studies in the 20th Century (= Lectures and Research. Vol. 62). Thorbecke, Ostfildern 2005, ISBN 3-7995-6862-X (digitized version).
- Space Survey and Spatial Awareness in the Later Middle Ages (= Lectures and Research. Vol. 49). Thorbecke, Stuttgart 2002, ISBN 3-7995-6649-X (digitized version)
- German Royal Court, Court Day and Imperial Diet in the Later Middle Ages (= Lectures and Research. Vol. 48). Thorbecke, Stuttgart 2002, ISBN 3-7995-6648-1 (digitized version)
- Acculturation and Self-assertion: Studies on the History of the Development of the Lands between the Elbe/Saale and Oder rivers in the Late Middle Ages (= Reports and Papers. Berlin-Brandenburg Academy of Sciences and Humanities. Special Volume 6). Academy Publishing House, Berlin 2001, ISBN 3-05-003557-9.
- Regional Identity and Social Groups in the German Middle Ages (= Journal for Historical Research. Supplement. Volume 14). Duncker & Humblot, Berlin 1992, ISBN 3-428-07472-6.
- The Geographical World View around 1300. Politics in the Field of tension between Knowledge, Myth and Fiction (= Journal of Historical Research. Supplement. Volume 6 = German Historians' Conference. Volume 36). Duncker & Humblot, Berlin 1989, ISBN 3-428-06613-8.
- ""Alliance systems" and "Foreign Policy" in the Later Middle Ages" (= Journal of Historical Research. Supplement. Vol. 5). Duncker & Humblot, Berlin 1988, ISBN 3-428-06456-9.
- Travelling in the Late Middle Ages (= Journal of Historical Research. Supplement. Vol. 1). Duncker & Humblot, Berlin 1985, ISBN 3-428-05918-2.
- with Hans Georg Gundel, Volker Press: Academia Gissensis: Contributions to the Older University History of Giessen (= Publications of the Historical Commission for Hesse. Volume 45). 2 parts. Elwert, Marburg 1982, ISBN 3-7708-0734-0.

Editorships of series and journals

- Journal for Historical Research, 1974 ff; Supplements 1985 ff.
- Contributions to the Social and Constitutional History of the Old Reich, 1977 ff.
- Propylaea History of Germany in 9 volumes, 1983 ff.
- Lexikon des Mittelalters 1987 ff., from vol. 4, Munich / Zürich 1989
- New German History in 10 volumes, Munich 1984 ff.
- Studia Giessensia, 1990 ff.
- Research on Medieval History N. F., 1998 ff.

== Bibliography ==
Representations

- Paul-Joachim Heinig et al. (Ed.): Reich, Regionen und Europa in Mittelalter und Neuzeit. Festschrift für Peter Moraw (= Historische Forschungen. Band 67). Duncker & Humblot, Berlin 2000, ISBN 3-428-10028-X.
- Oliver Jungen: Königsnaher Staatsfeind. Der Gießener Mittelalterhistoriker Peter Moraw wird siebzig. In: Frankfurter Allgemeine Zeitung, 30 August 2005, No. 201, p. 36.
- Peter Moraw. In: Jürgen Petersohn (Ed.): Der Konstanzer Arbeitskreis für mittelalterliche Geschichte. Die Mitglieder und ihr Werk. Eine bio-bibliographische Dokumentation (= Veröffentlichungen des Konstanzer Arbeitskreises für Mittelalterliche Geschichte aus Anlass seines fünfzigjährigen Bestehens 1951–2001. Volume 2). Thorbecke, Stuttgart 2001, ISBN 3-7995-6906-5, p. 283–294 (digital copy).
- Christine Reinle (Ed.): Stand und Perspektiven der Sozial- und Verfassungsgeschichte zum römisch-deutschen Reich. Der Forschungseinfluss Peter Moraws auf die deutsche Mediävistik (= Studien und Texte zur Geistes- und Sozialgeschichte des Mittelalters. Volume 10). Didymos-Publishing House, Affalterbach 2016, ISBN 3-939020-30-3.
- Rainer Christoph Schwinges (Ed.): Über König und Reich. Aufsätze zur deutschen Verfassungsgeschichte des späten Mittelalters. Festschrift aus Anlass des 60. Geburtstags von Peter Moraw am 31. August 1995. Thorbecke, Sigmaringen 1995, ISBN 3-7995-7076-4.
- Wer ist wer? Das deutsche Who’s Who. XLVII. Issue 2008/2009, p. 875.
- Moraw, Peter. In: Friedhelm Golücke: Verfasserlexikon zur Studenten- und Hochschulgeschichte. SH-Publishing House, Köln 2004, ISBN 3-89498-130-X. p. 232–234.

Necrologies

- Michael Borgolte: Nachruf auf Peter Moraw. In: Berlin-Brandenburgische Akademie der Wissenschaften. Jahrbuch 2013. Berlin 2014, p. 78 f. (online)
- Eva-Marie Felschow: Prof. Dr. Dr. h. c. Peter Moraw. In: Mitteilungen des Oberhessischen Geschichtsvereins. Volume 98, 2013, p. 5–6.
- Johannes Kunisch: Nachruf auf Peter Moraw. In: Zeitschrift für Historische Forschung. Volume 40, 2013, p. 181–182.
- Werner Paravicini: Peter Moraw 1935–2013. In: Mitteilungen der Residenzen-Kommission der Akademie der Wissenschaften zu Göttingen. N. F.: Stadt und Hof. Volume 2, 2013, p. 11–22 (online).
- Christine Reinle: Nachruf Peter Moraw (* 31. August 1935; † 8. April 2013). In: Blätter für deutsche Landesgeschichte Volume 149, 2013, p. 551–554.
- Frank Rexroth: Nekrolog Peter Moraw (1935–2013). In: Historische Zeitschrift. Volume 297, 2013, p. 877–880.
