= Hochland =

Hochland (German: highland) may refer to:

- Hochland (magazine), a German Catholic magazine (1903–1971)
- Hochland (Warhammer), a game
- Hochland Park, a suburb of the City of Windhoek
