= Death from Reval =

1939 short story collection by Werner Bergengruen

- Title page of German language original, Der Tod von Reval. Kuriose Geschichten aus einer alten Stadt (1965 edition)
- Author: Werner Bergengruen
- Original title: Der Tod von Reval
- Translator: Albrecht Classen
- Language: German
- Publisher: Hanseatische Verlagsanstalt
- Publication date: 1939
- Publication place: Germany
- English publication date: 27 May 2021
- Pages: 177

Death from Reval (German: Der Tod von Reval. Kuriose Geschichten aus einer alten Stadt, lit. 'The Death from Reval: Curious Stories from an Old City') is a 1939 short story collection by the German writer Werner Bergengruen. It consists of stories set in the Tallinn area, all relating to death in one way or another.

It is Bergengruen's most famous work. Along with several other stories by Bergengruen, the entirety of Death from Reval was translated to English by Albrecht Classen and published in the 2021 volume Short Stories by Werner Bergengruen: A Selection of His Novellas.

== Contents ==
- Prologue: "The City of the Dead"
- "Report about the Course of Life and the Course of Death of a Curious Man"
- "The Sea Devil"
- "Jakubson's Refuge"
- "The Curious Guesthouse"
- "Kaddri in the Fishing Hole"
- "Schneider and his Obelisk"
- "The Head"
- "The Yellow Funeral Vanguard"
- Epilogue: "Good-Bye"
