= Peter Wust =

German existentialist philosopher

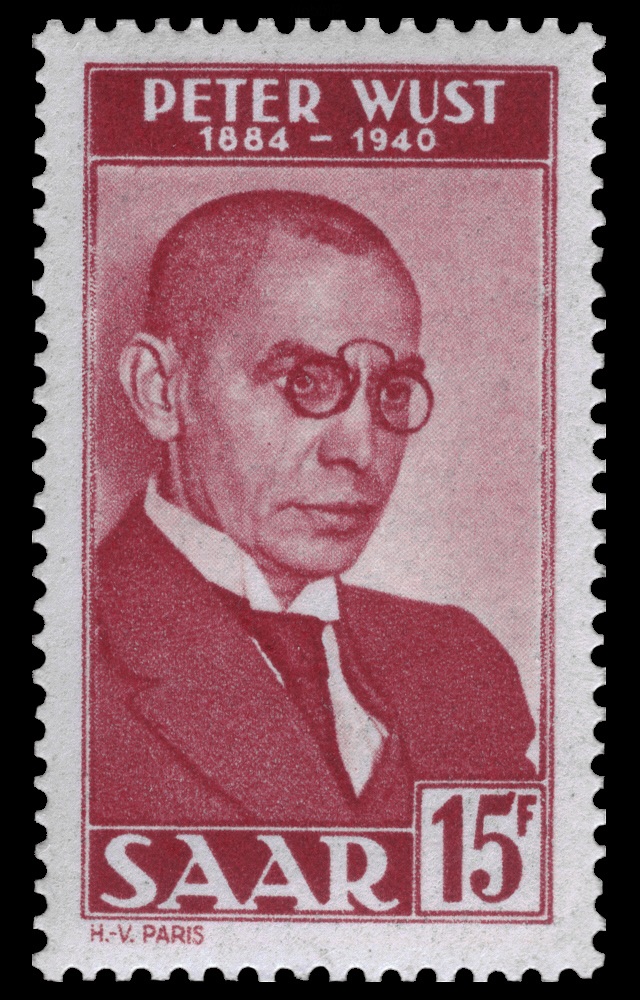
Stamp commemorating the tenth anniversary of Wust's death.

Peter Wust (28 August 1884, Rissenthal – 3 April 1940, Münster) was a German existentialist philosopher.

== Biography ==
Wust was born the oldest of eleven children in Rissenthal in Saarland. He attended the local public school, then the Friedrich-Wilhelm-Gymnasium, in Trier. Though his parents had hoped he would become a Catholic priest, he decided on studying Geisteswissenschaft. After 1907, Wust pursued German studies, English studies, and philosophy in Berlin and Strasbourg. He taught in Berlin, Neuss, Trier, and Cologne, and earned his doctorate in 1914 from the University of Bonn.

Under the influence of Max Scheler, Wust, originally a neo-Kantian, moved toward Christian existentialism, a development in which the burgeoning Renouveau catholique, the originally French effort to modernize and enlighten traditional, conservative Catholicism, played an important part. In 1928, in Paris, Wust met Georges Bernanos, Paul Claudel, and Jacques Maritain. He developed close friendships with the editors of the Munich-based Catholic monthly Hochland, Carl Muth and Otto Gruendler, maintaining an "intense" correspondence with them and publishing six essays in the magazine between 1922 and 1926.

Wust, without habilitation, was appointed professor of philosophy at the University of Münster. At the same time as Martin Heidegger, he developed an existentialist philosophy, though Wust's was essentially Christian. When Adolf Hitler came to power, Wust, one of the few early readers of Mein Kampf, became active in the church's resistance. He promoted a cultural offensive for Catholic Germany, and based much of his philosophy on what he perceived as the cultural unity of Europe.

He suffered from cancer since 1938 and died at age 56. Before his death he wrote a farewell letter to his students, which reportedly was widely read at the Eastern Front.

== Reception ==
Founded in 1982, the Peter Wust Society is dedicated to the spiritual heritage of Wust. Its 20th anniversary occasioned a monument to commemorate Ungewissheit und Wagnis. The house in Rissenthal where Wust was born is marked with a plaque. A school is dedicated to him in Münster, as are gymnasiums in Wittlich and Merzig. The Peter Wust Society annually awards a "Little Peter Wust Award" to a graduate from one of the two gymnasiums.

The Catholic Academy of Trier and the Association for Christian Adult Education award a biannual prize, the Peter Wust Prize, for the promotion of European culture and unification. The 2005 winner was the German politician Bernhard Vogel.

Werner Schüßler, philosophy professor at the University of Trier, re-edited Wust's magnum opus, Ungewissheit und Wagnis, in 2002. in einer neuen Bearbeitung herausgegeben (LIT Verlag, Münster). The influence of Wust's philosophy on Paul Klee's student Hubert Berke (1908–1979) was the subject of a 2004-2005 exposition in Merzig, "Von Peter Wust zu Paul Klee - Der Kölner Maler Hubert Berke."

== Bibliography ==
None of his works has been translated into English, however, in the book “The Persistence of Order, Vol. 1: Essays on Religion and Culture” which is composed of many commissioned essays by a variety of Catholic thinkers, one of his essays called “The Crisis of the West” is featured in it.

Works by Wust (selection)

- Auferstehung der Metaphysik (1925)
- Rückkehr aus dem Exil (1926)
- Dialektik des Geistes (1928)
- Der Mensch und die Philosophie (1934)
- Ungewissheit und Wagnis (1937)
- Gestalten und Gedanken (1940)
- Abschiedswort (1940)
- Gesammelte Werke Ed. Wilhelm Vernekohl, 10 volumes. Münster: Regensberg-Verlag, 1963–1969

=== Books on Wust ===
- Peter Keller (ed.), Begegnung mit Peter Wust. 26 Autoren im Dialog mit dem christlichen Existenzphilosophen aus dem Saarland. Saarbrücken: Verlag Die Mitte, 1984. ISBN 3-921236-48-7
- Alexander Lohner, Peter Wust. Münster: Regensberg, 1991, ISBN 3-7923-0601-8
- Alexander Lohner, Peter Wust. Gewissheit und Wagnis. Paderborn: Schöningh, 1995.
- Bernhard Scherer, Ein moderner Mystiker. Begegnung mit Peter Wust. Würzburg: Naumann, 1974.
- Wilhelm Vernekohl, Der Philosoph von Münster. Münster: Regensberg, 1950.
- Peter Wust und Wilhelm Vernekohl, Briefe und Aufsätze. Münster: Regensberg, 1958.
- Josef Pieper, Noch wußte es niemand. Autobiographische Aufzeichnungen 1904 - 1945. Munich, 1976. Pp. 152ff.
- F. Werner Veauthier, Kulturkritik als Aufgabe der Kulturphilosophie. Peter Wusts Bedeutung als Kultur- und Zivilisationskritiker. Heidelberg, 1997.
