= Werner Bergengruen =

Baltic German novelist and poet (1892–1964)

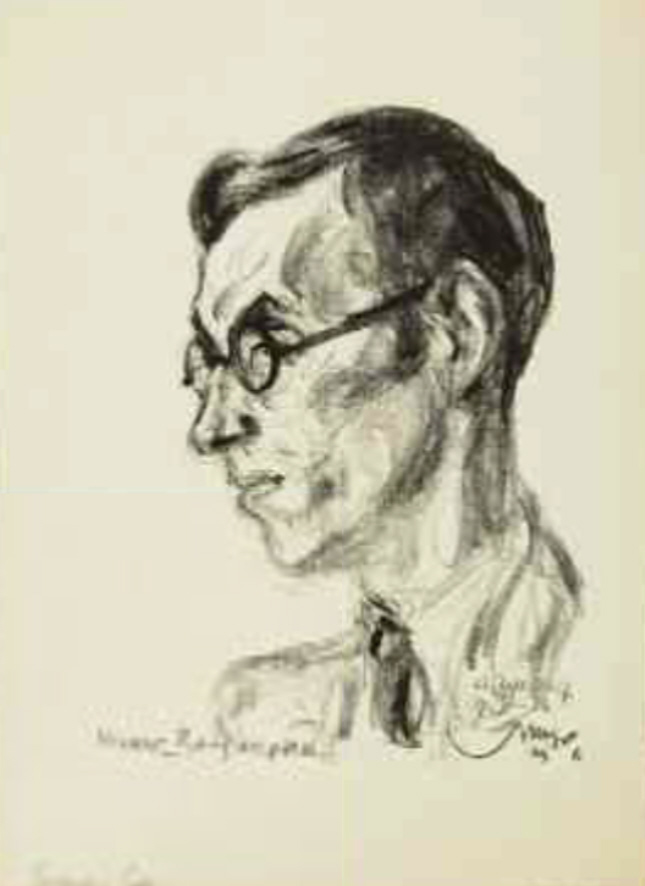
- Werner Bergengruen
- Born: 16 September 1892; Riga, Livonia, Russian Empire (now Latvia)
- Died: 4 September 1964 (aged 71); Baden-Baden, West Germany
- Occupations: poet, novelist
- Spouse: Charlotte Hensel

Werner Bergengruen (September 16, 1892 – September 4, 1964) was a Baltic German novelist and poet. His best known works include the 1935 novel A Matter of Conscience and the 1939 short story collection Death from Reval.

== Life and career ==
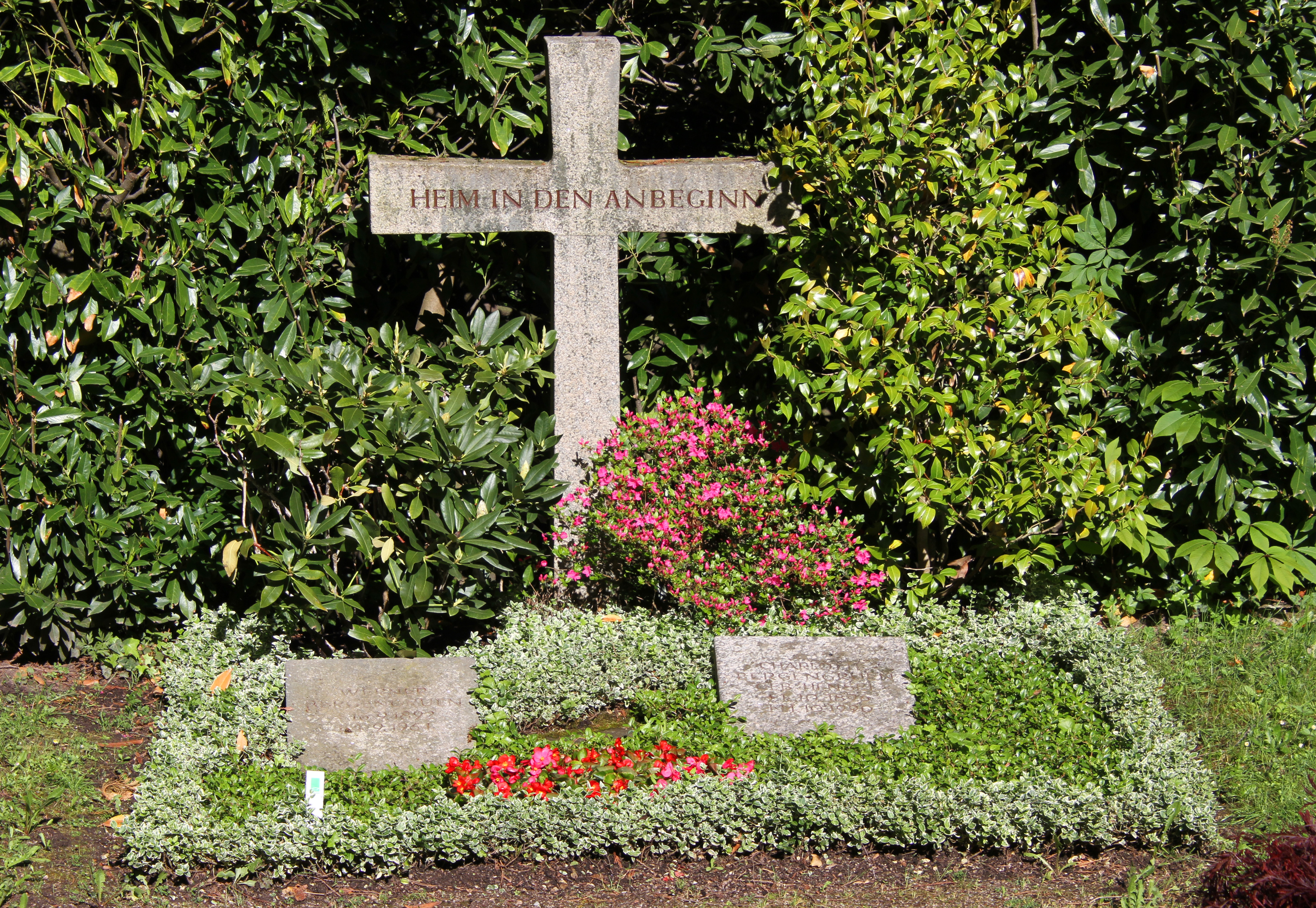
Grave in the main cemetery of Baden-Baden

Bergengruen was born in Riga, Governorate of Livonia, which at that time belonged to the Russian Empire. After growing up in Lübeck and attending the Katharineum, he started studying theology in Marburg in 1911. He later changed to studying Germanistics and art history, but failed to graduate; he then moved to Munich. He served as a lieutenant during World War I and joined the Baltische Landeswehr in 1919 to fight against the Bolsheviks.

On 4 October 1919, he married Charlotte Hensel, a great-granddaughter of the composer Fanny Hensel, and the daughter of the mathematician Kurt Hensel. From the marriage there were four children, Olaf, Luise, Maria and Alexander.

Bergengruen started writing novels and short stories in 1923 and decided to become a full-time writer in 1927. While his earlier works were of a more contemplative nature and pondered metaphysical and religious questions, the Nazis' rise to power led him to write more political works. His most successful novel, Der Großtyrann und das Gericht (The Grand Tyrant and the Judgment, English title: A Matter of Conscience), published in 1935, is set in the Renaissance era, but the story of a merciless tyrant playing with the weaknesses of his underlings was often seen as a clear allegory on Germany's political situation. This interpretation is doubtful, though, as most of the novel was written before the Nazi takeover in 1933. In 1936 Bergengruen was received into the Catholic Church. The same year he moved to Munich; his new neighbour was Carl Muth, editor of the Catholic monthly Hochland. In 1937 he was expelled from the Reich Chamber of Literature for being unfit to contribute to German culture. Although Bergengruen was politically a staunch conservative, his Catholicism—as well as the fact that his wife was of partly Jewish heritage—contributed to his alienation from the Nazi regime. According to Gudrun Kuschke, "Bergengruen constitutes the zenith of clandestine poetry during the Nazi era," and his poetry "confronts the catastrophe of the Third Reich, facing the reality of inner and external destruction without evasion or adornment."

His 1939 short story collection Death from Reval consists of stories relating to death in the Tallinn area.

In 1942, after his house in Munich was destroyed by bombs, Bergengruen moved to Achenkirch. After World War II, he lived in Switzerland, Rome, and finally Baden-Baden, where he died in 1964.

He was submitted for consideration for the Nobel Prize in Literature.

== Books ==
- A Matter of Conscience (Transl. German: Der Großtyrann und das Gericht). Translated by Norman Cameron. New York: Thames & Hudson, 1952. Review: Books: Morality Whodunit, TIME May 12, 1952 (ISBN 978-086-922740-4).
- Rome remembered (Transl. German: Römisches Erinnerungsbuch). Introduced by Clare Boothe Luce. Translated by Roland Hill. 40 color plates by Erich Lessing; 57 engravings by G. B. Piranesi. New York: Herder and Herder, 1968 (ISBN 978-022-397663-4).
- Short Stories by Werner Bergengruen: A Selection of His Novellas (Contains Der Tod von Reval and other stories). Translated by Albrecht Classen. Newcastle upon Tyne: Cambridge Scholars Publishing, 2021 (ISBN 978-1-5275-6913-3).
