= Theodor Schieffer =

German historian

- Born: 11 June 1910; Bad Godesberg, Germany
- Died: 9 April 1992 (aged 81); Germany
- Occupations: Writer, historian

Theodor Schieffer (11 June 1910 in Bad Godesberg – 9 April 1992 in Bad Godesberg) was a German historian. He was professor of medieval history at the University of Mainz, then at the University of Cologne, and since 1952 he was president of the Association for Middle Rhine Church History. He is the author of Winfrid-Bonifatius und die christliche Grundlegung Europas, the authoritative biography of Saint Boniface.

== Biography ==
Schieffer studied history, Romance studies, and classical philology in Bonn, Berlin, and Paris. A member of the Katholischer Studentenverein Arminia Bonn, one of Germany's oldest Catholic student societies, he wrote his PhD dissertation under the direction of Wilhelm Levison, Die päpstlichen Legaten in Frankreich vom Vertrage von Meersen (870) bis zum Schisma von 1130 (1934). In 1935 he began to work for the Monumenta Germaniae Historica (MGH), where he edited the Diplomata editions on Lothair I, Lothair II of Lotharingia, Zwentibold, Louis the Child, and the Burgundian kings. In 1936, he published an essay on Alexis de Tocqueville in the Munich-based Catholic periodical Hochland, founded by Carl Muth. The essay, in its discussion of liberty, justice, and law, was a veiled critique of Nazi Germany; in the "remarkable" essay he cites de Tocqueville, "I have always loved liberty; all my thoughts lead me to the conviction that without it there can be no moral or political greatness." During World War II Schieffer worked as archivist in Paris.

After the war was over, he returned to teaching and in 1946 accepted a position at the University of Mainz, where he became professor in 1951. In 1954 he left for Cologne, where he accepted an endowed chair. In that same year he published his biography of Saint Boniface; Winfrid-Bonifatius und die christliche Grundlegung Europas is still hailed by many as the single best book on Boniface. In 1956 he became a member of the central board for the Monumenta Germaniae Historica in Munich, in 1957 he joined the historical committee of the Bavarian Academy of Sciences and in 1964 likewise for the Rheinisch-Westfällischen Academy of Sciences. He died on 9 April 1992 in his birthplace. His son, Rudolf Schieffer, likewise a historian of the middle ages, was president of the MGH from 1994 to 2012.

== Bibliography ==
- Aaij, Michel (May 2007). "Boniface's Booklife: How the Ragyndrudis Codex Came to be a Vita Bonifatii". The Heroic Age (10). Archived from the original on 9 October 2012.
- Emerton, Ephraim; Thomas F.X. Noble (2000). The Letters of Saint Boniface. Columbia UP. ISBN 978-0-231-12093-7.
- Fuchs, Konrad (1999). "Schieffer, Theodor". In Bautz, Traugott (ed.). Biographisch-Bibliographisches Kirchenlexikon (BBKL) (in German). Vol. 16. Herzberg: Bautz. cols. 1420–1426. ISBN 3-88309-079-4.
- Grosse, Rolf (2007). "Theodor Schieffer: Ein rheinischer Historiker und seine 'Begegnung mit der romanisch-französischen Welt'". In Ulrich Pfeil (ed.). Das Deutsche Historische Institut Paris und seine Gründungsväter: ein personengeschichtlicher Ansatz. Oldenbourg Wissenschaftsverlag. pp. 119–38. ISBN 978-3-486-58519-3.
- Kaudelka, Steffen (2003). "La Société Féodale: Zur Rezeption eines 'vergessenes' Buches". Rezeption im Zeitalter der Konfrontation: Französische Geschichtswissenschaft und Geschichte in Deutschland 1920–1940. Vandenhoeck & Ruprecht. pp. 228–238. ISBN 978-3-525-35184-0.
- Lutterbach, Hubertus (2004). "Bonifatius—Kommunikator und Global Player". Stimmen der Zeit. 222: 409–21.
- Mostert, Marco (1995). "Bonifatius als geschiedvervalser". Madoc (in Dutch). 9 (1): 213–20.
- Noble, Thomas F.X.; Thomas Head (1995). Soldiers of Christ: saints and saints lives from late antiquity and the early Middle ages. Penn State Press. ISBN 978-0-271-01345-9.
- Pape, Matthias (2007). "Stephan Skalweit: Bonner Frankreichforschung nach 1945, Themen, Methoden, Forschungsorganisation". In Ulrich Pfeil (ed.). Das Deutsche Historische Institut Paris und seine Gründungsväter: ein personengeschichtlicher Ansatz. Oldenbourg Wissenschaftsverlag. pp. 139–76. ISBN 978-3-486-58519-3.
