= Heinrich Lützeler =

German philosopher, art historian, and literary scholar

Heinrich Lützeler (27 January 1902 in Bonn – 13 June 1988 in Bonn) was a German philosopher, art historian, and literary scholar. He presided over a number of institutes and was dean at the department of philosophy at the University of Bonn.

== Biography ==
Heinrich Lützeler was born the son of a porcelain painter in Bonn. He studied philosophy, art history, and literature at the University of Bonn with Paul Clemen and Wilhelm Worringer, and in 1924 earned his doctorate with a dissertation on art perception under the direction of the philosopher Max Scheler. He made a living writing theater reviews and giving lectures, while working on his habilitation, Grundstile der Kunst. He became a private teacher of philosophy in Bonn, but in 1940 was banned from teaching by the Nazi government. His final lecture at the University of Bonn, "On the Academic Profession" (29 February 1940) was printed and distributed by his students and became widely known in and around Bonn. In 1942 he was banned from writing and speaking throughout Germany and was under observation. Since 1942 he published with Herder publishers in Spanish, Slovak, Hungarian, Romanian, and Swedish, for export only.

Weeks after the end of the war he began assisting in the reconstruction of the University of Bonn. He joined the building committee (remaining a member until 1970), and was appointed professor in art history. In 1946 he took over as head of the department of art history. In 1954 became head of the building committee, and from 1954 to 1955 served as dean of the department of philosophy. In 1967, he used his own money to found the Institute for Oriental Art History, which he led until 1985; it became a separate department in 1974. From 1967 to 1968 he served again as dean of the department of philosophy; even after becoming emeritus, in 1970, he continued to be active in teaching and research. Throughout his life, he was interested in and published on local history and especially the local dialect, Ripuarian.

Heinrich Lützeler is buried on the Südfriedhof in Bonn.

== Importance ==
Since the 1920s, Lützeler wrote on Christian art and was a regular contributor to the Munich-based Catholic monthly magazine Hochland; he was regarded as one of its most important contributors and a representative of the Renouveau catholique movement in Germany, the originally French effort to modernize and enlighten traditional, conservative Catholicism.

== Notable works ==
- Kunsterfahrung und Kunstwissenschaft. Systematische und entwicklungsgeschichtliche Darstellung und Dokumentation des Umgangs mit der bildenden Kunst. 3 Volumes (Orbis academicus I/15,1–3). Freiburg/München: Alber, 1975. ISBN 3-495-47309-2.
- Führer zur Kunst. Freiburg im Breisgau: Herder, 1938.
- Philosophie des Kölner Humors. Hanau/Main: Peters, 1954.
- "Kölner Humor auf der Straße." Sonderheft Köln 27.5 (May 1955): I–XVI, 189–242
- Kölsches Milieu. With Mita Savelsberg. Köln: Rheinau, [1980s].

== Bibliography ==
- Grünewald, Eckhart (1997). "'Not Only in Learned Circles': The Reception of Frederick the Second in Germany before the Second World War". In Robert Louis Benson, Johannes Fried (ed.). Ernst Kantorowicz: Erträge der Doppeltagung Institute for Advanced Study, Princeton, Johann Wolfgang Goethe-Universität, Frankfurt. Franz Steiner Verlag. pp. 162–77. ISBN 978-3-515-06959-5.
- Niessen, Josef (2007). Bonner Personenlexikon. Bouvier. ISBN 978-3-416-03159-2.
- Kroll, Frank-Lothar (2008). Intellektueller Widerstand im Dritten Reich: Heinrich Lützeler und der Nationalsozialismus. Duncker & Humblot. ISBN 978-3-428-12822-8.
- Kroll, Frank-Lothar (2008). "'...Gott schütze unser liebes Deutsches Volk!' Heinrich Lützeler im Dritten Reich". In Joachim Scholtyseck and Christoph Studt (ed.). Universitäten und Studenten im Dritten Reich: Bejahung, Anpassung, Widerstand : XIX. Königswinterer Tagung vom 17.-19. Februar 2006. LIT Verlag Münster. pp. 75–104. ISBN 978-3-8258-9753-6.
- Kessler, Oliver (2018). Der Kunsthistoriker Heinrich Lützeler (1902–1988): "Denn der Buchstabe tötet, aber der Geist macht lebendig." Die Gründung der Forschungsstelle für Orientalische Kunstgeschichte und "Geisteswissenschaften heute". In: Harald Meyer, Christine Schirrmacher, Ulrich Vollmer (edts.): Die Bonner Orient- und Asienwissenschaften: Eine Geschichte in 22 Porträts.. Ostasien Verlag. pp. 253–283. ISBN 978-3-946114-46-8.
- Kessler, Oliver (2025). Heinrich Lützeler, Willi Graf und die “Weiße Rose”. Einige Neufunde zur Rolle Heinrich Lützelers innerhalb der deutschen Widerstandsbewegung im Kontext bereits bekannter Quellen. In: Harald Meyer, Ulrich Vollmer (edts.): Fachgeschichten. Historische Köpfe und Vorgängerinstitutionen des Bonner Instituts für Orient- und Asienwissenschaften. Orientierungen Themenband 2025.. Ostasien Verlag. pp. 127–174. ISBN 978-3-911262-18-7.
