= Wilhelm Levison =

German writer and medieval historian (1876–1947)

- Born: 27 May 1876; Düsseldorf, Germany
- Died: 17 January 1947 (aged 70); Durham, England
- Occupations: Writer, medievalist

Wilhelm Levison (27 May 1876 – 17 January 1947) was a German Jewish medievalist.

Levison was well known as a contributor to Monumenta Germaniae Historica, especially for the vitae from the Merovingian era. He also edited Wilhelm Wattenbach's Deutschlands Geschichtsquellen im Mittelalter.

In 1935 Levison was forced to retire from his professorship at Bonn University because of the Nuremberg Laws. He fled Nazi Germany with his wife Elsa in the spring of 1939, taking a position at Durham University. Like many Jewish refugees, he was interned as an "enemy alien" by the British government from June 21, 1940, until September 2, 1940.

Levison delivered the Ford Lectures at the University of Oxford in 1943, and they were published as England and the Continent in the Eighth Century. He died during the preparation of Aus Rheinischer und Fränkischer Frühzeit (1948).

== Reputation and influence ==
Conrad Leyser described Levison as "one of the giants of twentieth-century historical scholarship, his England and the Continent in the Eighth century one of its canonical texts"; Nicholas Howe, in 2004, called that book of "enduring" importance. Five conferences have been held in commemoration of his work, and the lectures given at the 2007 meeting at Durham University were published in 2010. Theodor Schieffer dedicated his Winfried - Bonifatius und die christliche Grundlegung Europas to Levison, who had been his doctoral advisor.
