= Laelius de Amicitia =

Philosophical dialogue by Cicero

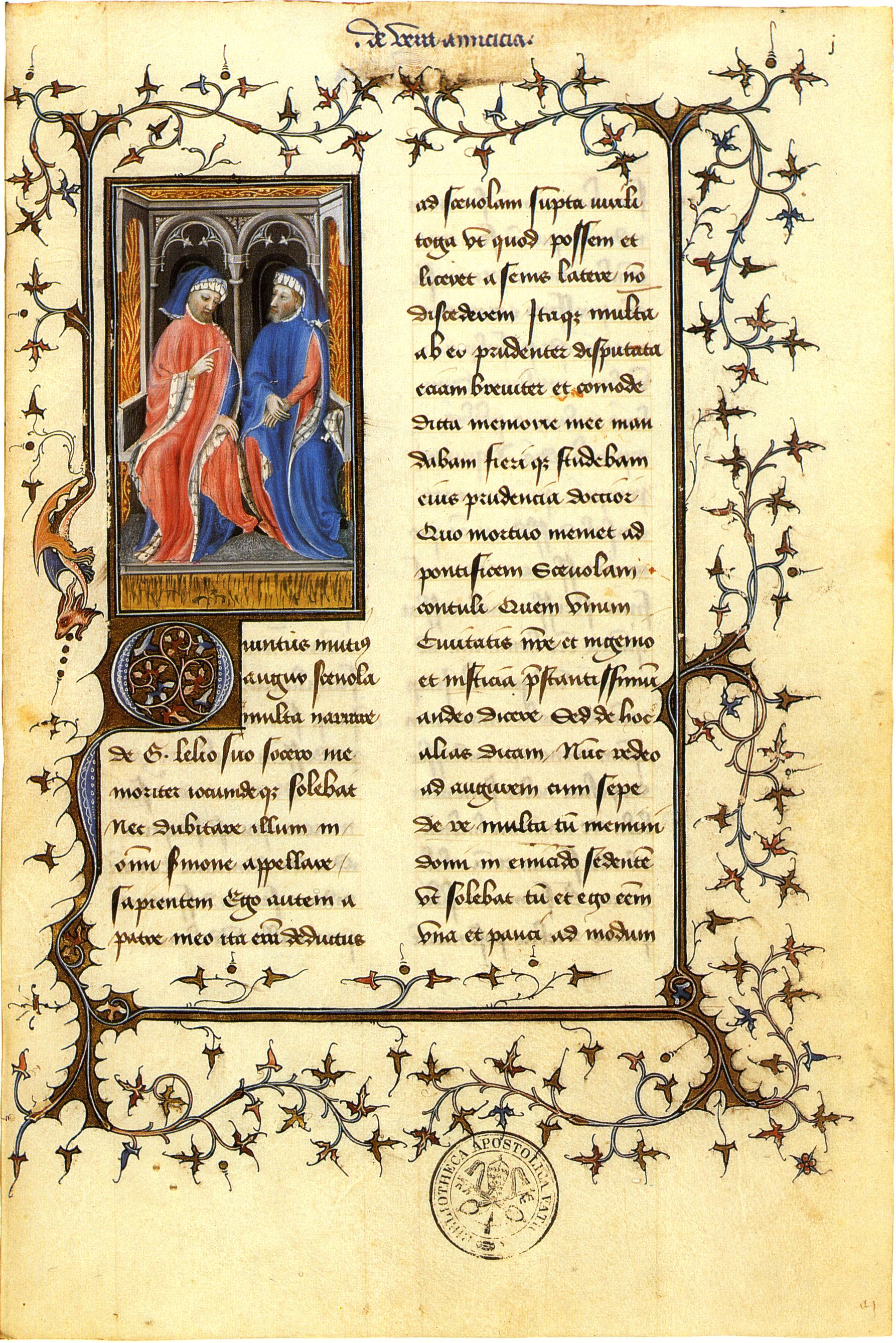
Laelius de Amicitia, 15th-century manuscript, Vatican

Laelius de Amicitia (or simply De Amicitia) is a treatise on friendship (amicitia) by the Roman statesman and author Marcus Tullius Cicero, written in 44 BC.

== Background ==
The work is written as a dialogue between prominent figures of the Middle Roman Republic and is set after the death of the younger Scipio Africanus (otherwise known as Scipio Aemilianus, Scipio Africanus Minor or Scipio the Younger) in 129 BC. The interlocutors of the dialogue chosen by Cicero are Gaius Laelius, a close friend of the late statesman, and Laelius's two sons-in-law, Gaius Fannius, and Quintus Mucius Scaevola. Cicero in his youth knew Scaevola and states that Scaevola described to him the substance of the conversation on Friendship which he and Fannius had held with Laelius a few days after the death of Scipio.

De Amicitia is addressed to Atticus, who, as Cicero tells him in his dedication, could not fail to discover his own portrait in the study of a perfect friend.

== Summary ==
In the dialogue Fannius, the historian, and Mucius Scaevola, the Augur, both sons-in-law of Laelius, pay him a visit immediately after the sudden and suspicious death of Scipio Africanus. The loss which Laelius had thus sustained leads to a eulogy on the virtues of the departed hero, and to a discussion on the nature of their friendship. Many of the sentiments which Laelius utters are declared by Scaevola to have originally flowed from Scipio, with whom the nature and laws of friendship formed a favourite topic of discourse.

But I must at the very beginning lay down this principle—friendship can only exist between good men. ... We mean then by the "good" those whose actions and lives leave no question as to their honour, purity, equity, and liberality; who are free from greed, lust, and violence; and who have the courage of their convictions.

== See also ==
- Esse quam videri
