= Rudolf Schieffer =

German historian (1947–2018)

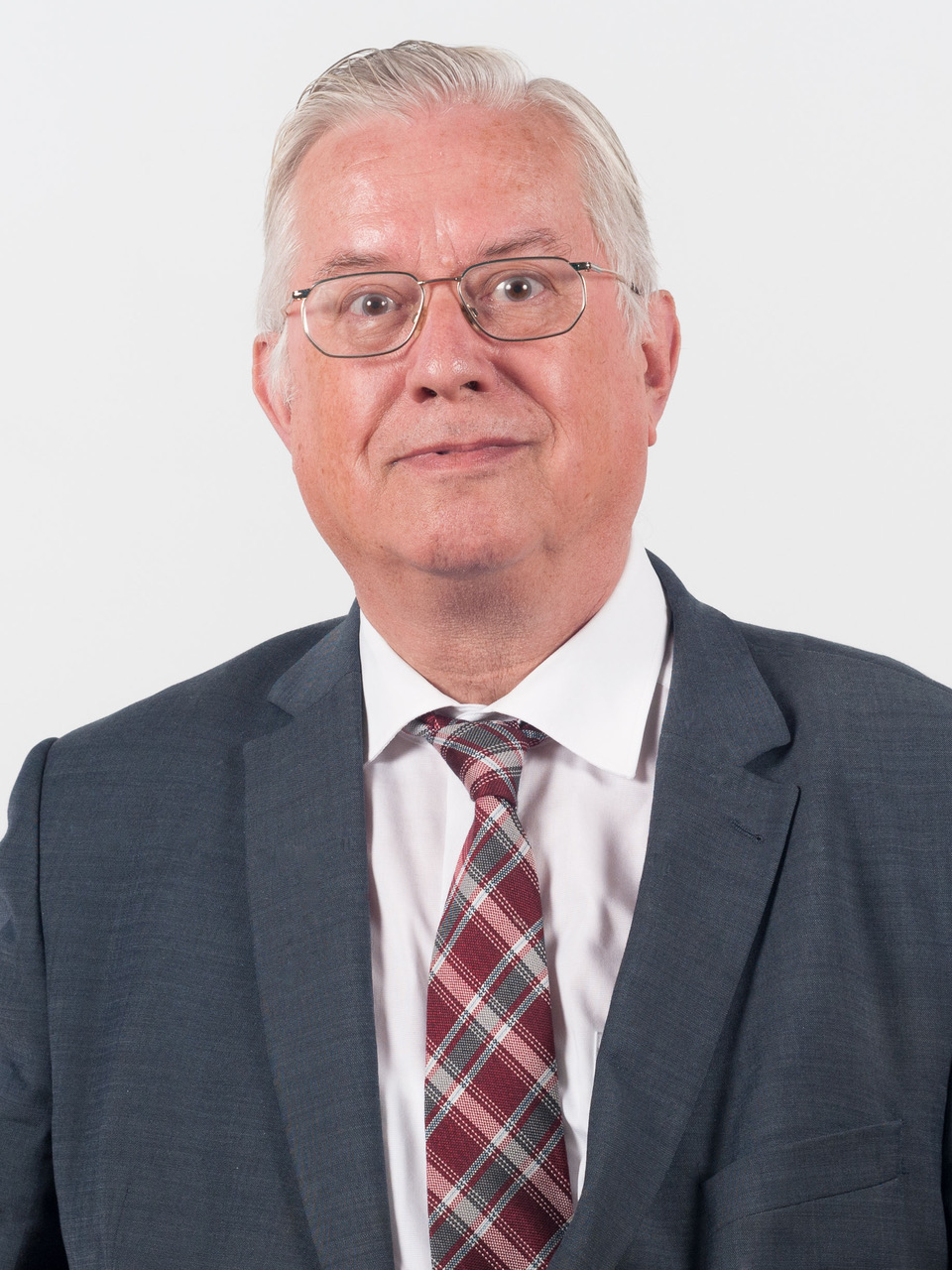
- Born: 31 January 1947
- Died: 14 September 2018 (aged 71)
- Occupation: German historian

Rudolf Schieffer (31 January 1947 – 14 September 2018) was a German historian specializing in medieval history. From 1994 to 2012 he was president of the Monumenta Germaniae Historica.

== Biography ==
Rudolf Schieffer was the son of the historian Theodor Schieffer. He graduated from high school (Abitur) in 1966, and studied history and Latin between 1966 and 1971 at the Rheinische Friedrich-Wilhelms-Universität Bonn and the Philipps-Universität Marburg. He received his doctorate in 1975 in Bonn, his dissertation, Die Entstehung von Domkapiteln in Deutschland, supervised by Eugen Ewig. From 1975 to 1980 he worked at the Monumenta Germaniae Historica (MGH). His habilitation, for Die Entstehung des päpstlichen Investiturverbots für den deutschen König, took place in 1979 at the University of Regensburg. In 1980 he was appointed professor of medieval and modern history at the Rheinische Friedrich-Wilhelms-Universität Bonn, and in 1994 went to the Ludwig-Maximilians-Universität München to take charge of the MGH.

Schieffer's specialism was the political, legal, and religious history from the late antique to the high middle ages, and particularly the era of the Carolingians. He was awarded the Eike-von-Repgow-Preis in 2008. Schieffer was a member of Nordrhein-Westfälische Akademie der Wissenschaften und der Künste, the Royal Historical Society, the Konstanzer Arbeitskreis für mittelalterliche Geschichte, the Akademie der Wissenschaften zu Göttingen, and the Österreichische Akademie der Wissenschaften. Since 2012 he was a member of the board of directors of the Roman Institute of the Görres Society.

== Publications ==
=== Source studies ===
- Hinkmar von Reims, De ordine palatii (= Monumenta Germaniae Historica Fontes iuris Germanici antiqui in usum scholarum separatim editi 3). Hannover 1980, ISBN 3-7752-5127-8. With Thomas Gross. (Digitalisat)
- Die Streitschriften Hinkmars von Reims und Hinkmars von Laon 869–871. (= Monumenta Germaniae Historica Concilia 4, supp. 2). Hannover 2003, ISBN 3-7752-5355-6. (Digitalisat)

=== Monographs ===
- Die Entstehung von Domkapiteln in Deutschland (= Bonner Historische Forschungen 43). Bonn 1976, ISBN 3-7928-0378-X.
- Die Entstehung des päpstlichen Investiturverbots für den deutschen König (= Schriften der MGH 28). Stuttgart 1981, ISBN 3-7772-8108-5.
- Die Karolinger (= Urban-Taschenbücher 411). Stuttgart 1992, fifth revised edition Stuttgart 2014, ISBN 978-3-17-023383-6.
- Papst Gregor VII. Kirchenreform und Investiturstreit (= Beck'sche Reihe 2492). C. H. Beck, München 2010, ISBN 978-3-406-58792-4.
- Christianisierung und Reichsbildungen. Europa 700–1200 (= Beck'sche Reihe 1981). C. H. Beck, München 2013, ISBN 978-3406653759.

=== Edited collections ===
- Die deutschsprachige Mediävistik im 20. Jahrhundert. (= Vorträge und Forschungen Band 62). Ostfildern 2005, ISBN 3-7995-6862-X. With Peter Moraw.
- Beiträge zur Geschichte des Regnum Francorum. Referate beim Wissenschaftlichen Colloquium zum 75. Geburtstag von Eugen Ewig am 28. Mai 1988 (= Beihefte der Francia Volume 22). Thorbecke, Sigmaringen 1990, ISBN 3-7995-7322-4. (Online auf perspectivia.net)
