= Hochland (magazine) =

20th-century German Catholic magazine

Hochland (German pronunciation: [ˈhoːxˌlant], lit. 'Highland') was a German Catholic magazine, published in Munich from 1903 to 1941 and again from 1946 to 1971. Founded by Carl Muth, it was regarded critically by the church, and published work by authors regardless of denomination on topics related to religion and culture.

Title page of Hochland, inaugural volume, 1903

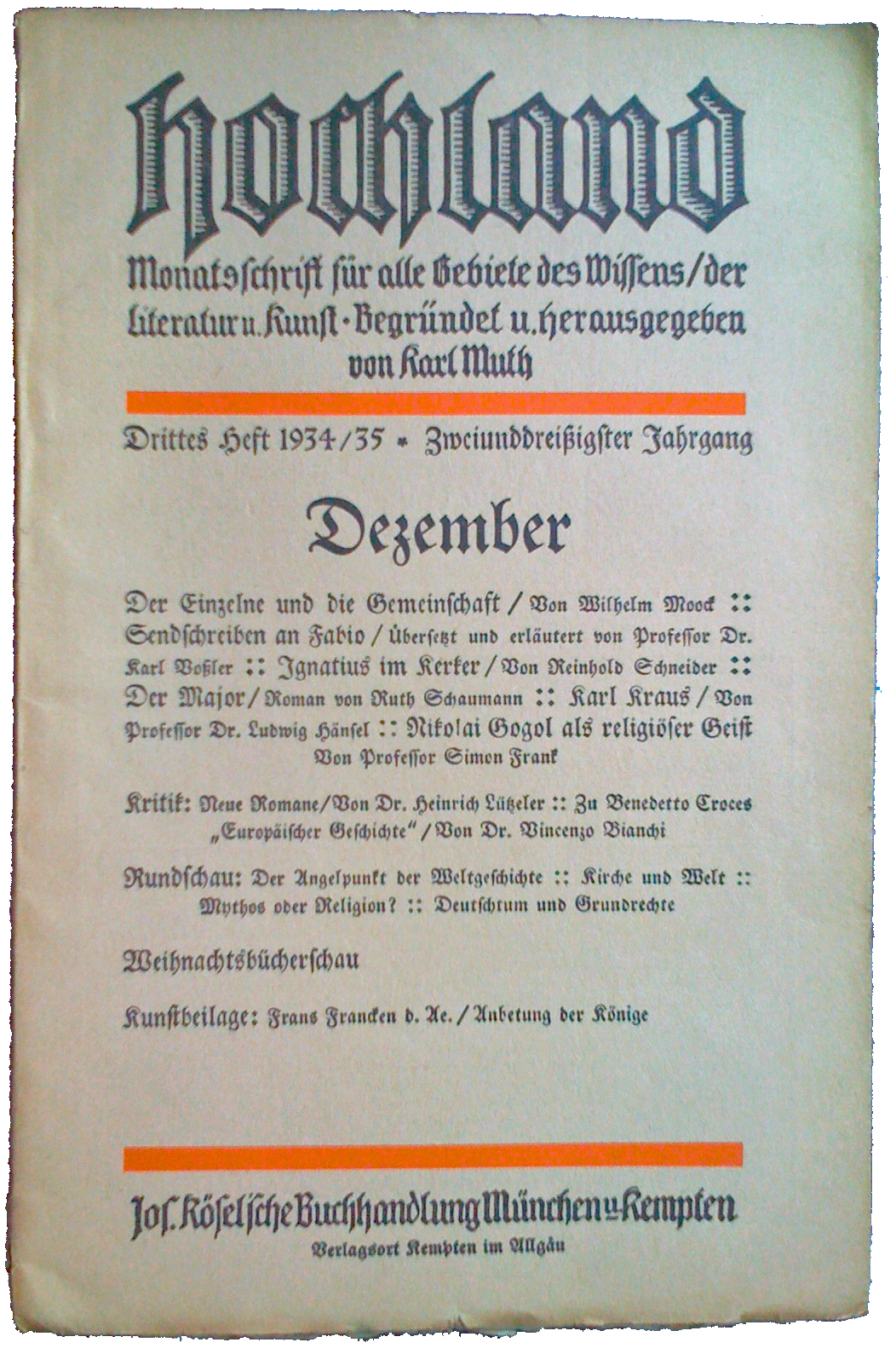
Title page of Hochland, volume December 1934

== History ==
Hochland was, according to its subtitle, a monthly magazine for all areas of knowledge, literature, and art. In the inaugural volume, Muth stated that the magazine was not to be the newsletter for any party, group, or existing movement. He envisioned a magazine focused on religion and art, and had great faith in the educational power of art and aesthetics to help alleviate cultural and political problems. Though the magazine itself was not to be specifically political, Muth developed close friendships with politically active people such as Hans and Sophie Scholl. From 1903 to 1932 it was edited by Carl Muth, then, until 1935, by Friedrich Fuchs, and from 1935 to 1939 again by Muth, and from 1939 until 1941, when it was banned by the Nazis, by Franz Joseph Schöningh. Its circulation in 1939 was 12,000.

Its regular contributors formed a "Hochland circle," which included Catholic philosophers and authors such as Carl Schmitt, Theodor Schieffer, Theodor Haecker, Gertrud von le Fort, Sigrid Undset, Werner Bergengruen, Max Scheler, Romano Guardini, Peter Wust, Alois Dempf, Philipp Funk, Otto Karrer, Joseph Wittig, Joseph Hengesbach, and Heinrich Lützeler.

During the Nazi period, Hochland published a number of controversial articles critical (though sometimes covertly so) of the government, such as an essay by Theodor Schieffer praising Alexis de Tocqueville and his love of liberty. According to Konrad Ackermann, the magazine was the most important magazine for the intellectual resistance against the government. In 1939, the publication of an essay by Joseph Bernhart ("Hodie," Latin for "Today") led to a ban on and pulping of the edition. The author, who had denounced the limitations placed on the press after Georg Elser's attempt on Adolf Hitler's life, was forbidden to publish anymore. The magazine was banned again in April 1941, after Friedrich Nietzsche was denounced as a killer of God. The attack on the Soviet Union gave the authorities a reason to ban the magazine definitively.

In November 1946 the magazine was reestablished. In 1971 it was renamed Neues Hochland, and in 1974 ceased publication.

== Position ==
The magazine's position within its culture is complex, since Muth's mission in many ways went against the confessionalism of the times: Muth promoted and even demanded a "catholic spirit" in literature that was neither confessional nor party-political. On the one hand, the magazine was placed on the Index librorum prohibitorum (the "List of Prohibited Books") in 1911; on the other hand, leading theologians published their work in it. The editors were eager to disengage from the reigning confessionalism of the period; they were critical of Nazism as well as of theological liberalism. The magazine was considered the official journal of the Renouveau catholique movement in Germany, the originally French effort to modernize and enlighten traditional, conservative Catholicism. According to Derek Hastings, Hochland was "by common acclaim the leading Catholic journal in the German-speaking world." Politically, it functioned as the opposite of the "ultraconservative" Catholic journal Gral, promoted by Martin Heidegger (who in 1909 was reported as publicly denounced Hochland as "going too deeply into the waters of modernism") and Viennese ideologue Richard von Kralik.

== Quote ==
"We have two weapons, and only those two, but they are invincible: that we know the truth and that we use our mind."

== Bibliography ==
- Ackermann, Konrad (1965). Der Widerstand der Monatsschrift Hochland gegen den Nationalsozialismus. Kösel-Verlag.
- Farías, Víctor (1991). Heidegger and Nazism. Temple UP. ISBN 978-0-87722-830-1.
- Garber, Steven (2007). The Fabric of Faithfulness: Weaving Together Belief and Behavior. InterVarsity Press. ISBN 978-0-8308-3319-1.
- Giacomin, Maria Cristina (2009). Zwischen katholischem Milieu und Nation: Literatur und Literaturkritik im 'Hochland' (1903-1918). Schöningh. ISBN 978-3-506-76729-5.
- Gottfried, Paul (1990). Carl Schmitt. Continuum. ISBN 978-1-870626-46-0.
- Grosse, Rolf (2007). "Theodor Schieffer: Ein rheinischer Historiker und seine 'Begegnung mit der romanisch-französischen Welt'". In Ulrich Pfeil (ed.). Das Deutsche Historische Institut Paris und seine Gründungsväter: ein personengeschichtlicher Ansatz. Oldenbourg Wissenschaftsverlag. pp. 119–38. ISBN 978-3-486-58519-3.
- Hastings, Derek (2003). "How 'Catholic' was the Early Nazi Movement? Religion, Race, and Culture in Munich, 1919-1924". Central European History. 36 (3): 383–433. doi:10.1163/156916103771006070. S2CID 145187701.
- Kaudelka, Steffen (2003). "La Société Féodale: Zur Rezeption eines 'vergessenes' Buches". Rezeption im Zeitalter der Konfrontation: Französische Geschichtswissenschaft und Geschichte in Deutschland 1920-1940. Vandenhoeck & Ruprecht. pp. 228–238. ISBN 978-3-525-35184-0.
- Kroll, Frank-Lothar (2008). "'...Gott schütze unser liebes Deutsches Volk!' Heinrich Lützeler im Dritten Reich". In Joachim Scholtyseck and Christoph Studt (ed.). Universitäten und Studenten im Dritten Reich: Bejahung, Anpassung, Widerstand : XIX. Königswinterer Tagung vom 17.-19. February 2006. LIT Verlag Münster. pp. 75–104. ISBN 978-3-8258-9753-6.
- McBrien, Richard P.; Harold W. Attridge (1995). The HarperCollins encyclopedia of Catholicism. HarperCollins. p. 616. ISBN 978-0-06-065338-5.
- Rappmannsberger, Franz (1952). Karl Muth und seine Zeitschrift "Hochland" als Vorkämpfer für die innere Erneuerung Deutschlands. Dissertation, U of Munich.
- Uffelen, Herbert van (1993). Moderne niederländische Literatur im deutschen Sprachraum 1830-1990. Lit Verlag Münster. ISBN 978-3-89473-741-2.
- Zankel, Sönke (2008). Mit Flugblättern gegen Hitler: der Widerstandskreis um Hans Scholl und Alexander Schmorell. Böhlau Verlag. ISBN 978-3-412-20038-1.
