= Ruth Schaumann =

German poet and artist (1899–1975)

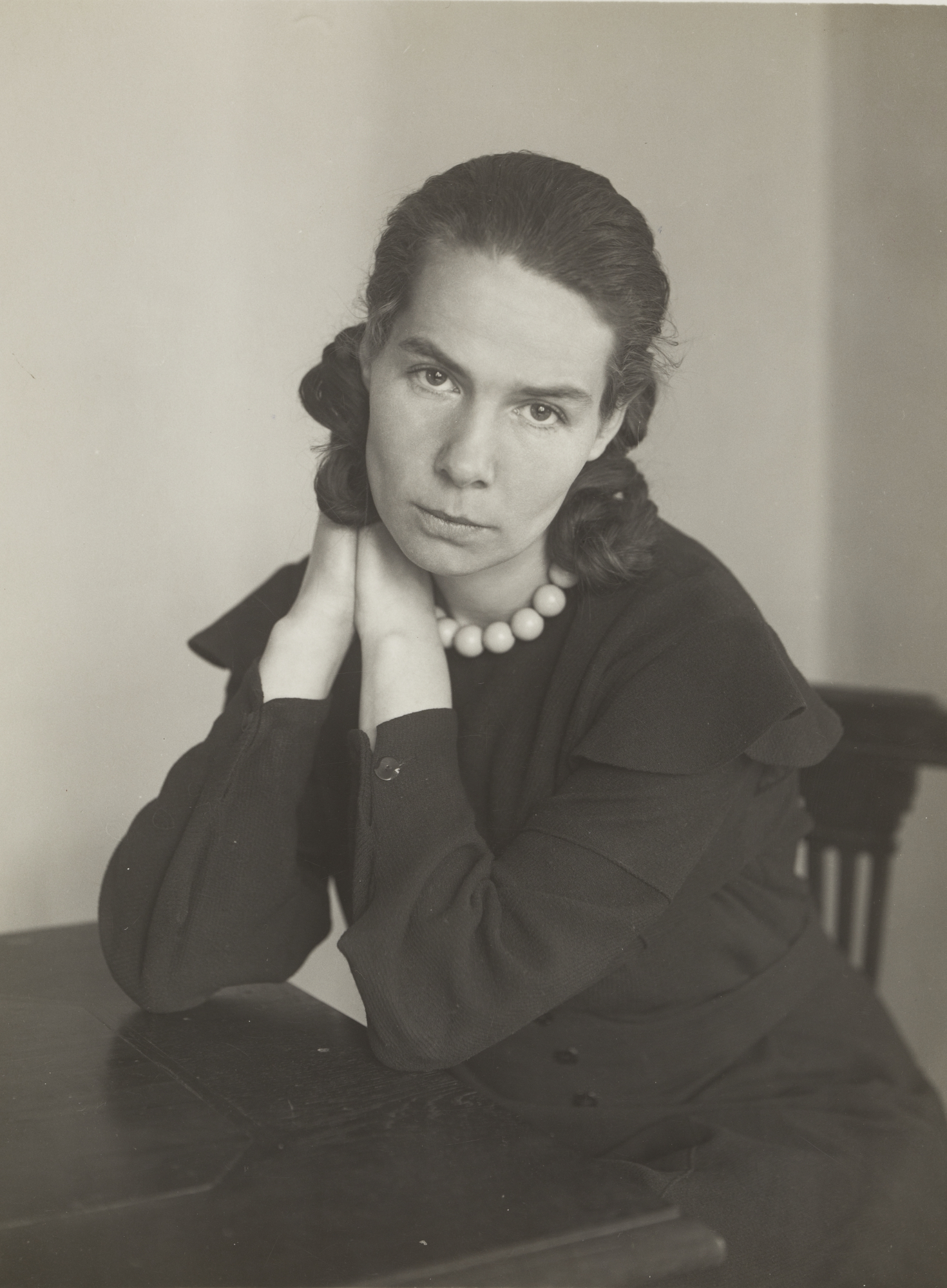
- Born: Ruth Anne Marie Schaumann; August 24, 1899; Hamburg, Germany
- Died: March 13, 1975 (aged 75); Munich, Germany

Ruth Schaumann (1899–1975) was a German poet and artist. She is known for both her writng (poetry and prose), as well as plastic arts (sculpture, stained glass, and illustration). Her work often incorporated Christian themes and images.

Schaumann was born on August 24, 1899 in Hamburg, Germany. As a child Schaumann contracted scarlet fever, which left her deaf. In 1917 she entered Staatlichen Kunstgewerbeschule (State School of Applied Arts) in Munich. There she studied sculpture under Joseph Wackerle. In 1924 she married Friedrich Fuchs, with whom she had five children.

Schaumann died on March 13, 1975 in Munich, Germany.
