= Sine ira et studio =

Latin term; "without anger and passion"

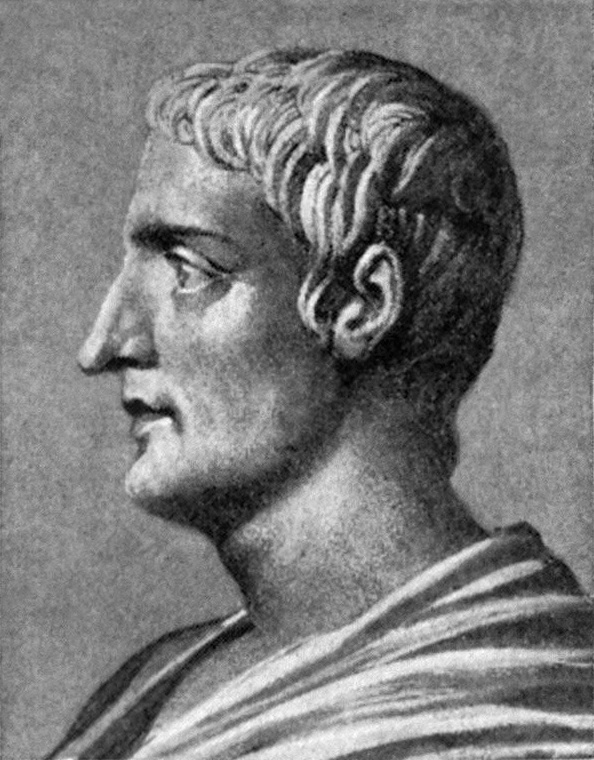
Gaius Cornelius Tacitus

Sine īrā et studiō is a Latin term meaning "without anger and zeal". It was coined by Roman historian Tacitus in the introduction to his Annals 1.1., which can be translated as follows:

The histories of Tiberius, Gaius, Claudius, and Nero, while they were in power, were falsified through terror, and after their death were written under the irritation of a recent hatred. Hence my purpose is to relate a few facts about Augustus - more particularly his last acts, then the reign of Tiberius, and all which follows, without either bitterness or partiality, from any motives to which I am far removed.

The quote is often used to remind historians, reporters, editors etc. not to get carried away by emotion when writing about war or crimes. It is also the motto of the Czech Bureau for Foreign Relations and Information, as well as of the Danish Army Military Police. A modern version is "without fear or favor".

== See also ==
- Bias
- Neutrality (philosophy)
