= Amicitia =

Amicitia is the Latin word for friendship, either between individuals, between the state and an individual or between states. It was "a technical term of Roman political life" from the 2nd century BC, when, according to Seneca, it was introduced by the Populares Gaius Gracchus and Marcus Livius Drusus, who thereby ranked their clientes. The clients and allies of the Roman state were called amici populi Romani (friends of the Roman people) and listed on the tabula amicorum (table of friends). Such amicitia did not involve treaties or reciprocal obligations. Although amicitia between individuals was ideally genuine friendship marked by mutual fondness, in practice it more often referred to mere political alliance. Forming and breaking bonds of amicitia was thus highly formal. The amici Augusti (friends of Augustus) formed the court in imperial times.

== See also ==
- Cicero, Laelius de amicitia
- Client state
