= Martin Deutinger =

German philosopher and religious writer

Martin Deutinger (24 March 1815 – 9 September 1864) was a German philosopher and religious writer, born in Langenpreising, Bavaria, and died at Pfäfers, Switzerland.

== Life ==
Deutinger first studied theology and philosophy at the Lyceum in Dillingen in 1832 before he heard the lectures of Friedrich Wilhelm Joseph Schelling in Munich in 1833 and became enthusiastic about the philosophy of art. He was ordained as a priest in 1837, and after filling several clerical positions, taught philosophy at Freising (1841), Munich (1846), and Dillingen (1847-52).

Inspired by Schelling, Deutinger worked in aesthetics and the philosophy of religion. He attempted an independent renewal of Christian thought in response to the challenges of idealism and romanticism.

== Works ==
- Das Verhältnis der Kunst zum Christentum. Schulprogramm. Freysing 1843.
- Grundlinien einer positiven Philosophie als vorläufiger Versuch einer Zurückführung aller Theile der Philosophie auf christliche Principien. (6 volumes) Manz, Regensburg 1843–1853.
- Bilder des Geistes in Kunst und Natur, 3 volumes, Augsburg 1850f.
1. Vol. 1: Aus freier Hand gezeichnet auf einer Reise nach Florenz im Jahre 1845. Kremer, Augsburg 1846.
2. Vol. 2: Gezeichnet auf einer Reise an den Rhein 1847. Schmidt, Augsburg 1849.
3. Vol. 3: Gezeichnet auf einer Reise nach Paris im Jahre 1850. Manz, Regensburg 1851.
- Das Princip der neueren Philosophie und die christliche Wissenschaft. Manz, Regensburg 1857.
- Renan und das Wunder. Ein Beitrag zur christlichen Apologetik. Cotta, München 1864.
- Der gegenwärtige Zustand der deutschen Philosophie. Lentner, München 1866.
- Bilder des Geistes in den Werken der Kunst. Ed. Lorenz Kastner. Lindauer, München 1866.
- Die christliche Ethik nach dem Apostel Johannes. Ed. Lorenz Kastner. Coppenrath, Regensburg 1867.
- Über das Verhältnis der Poesie zur Religion. Ed. Karl Muth. Kösel, Kempten/München 1915.
