= Michael Borgolte =

German historian

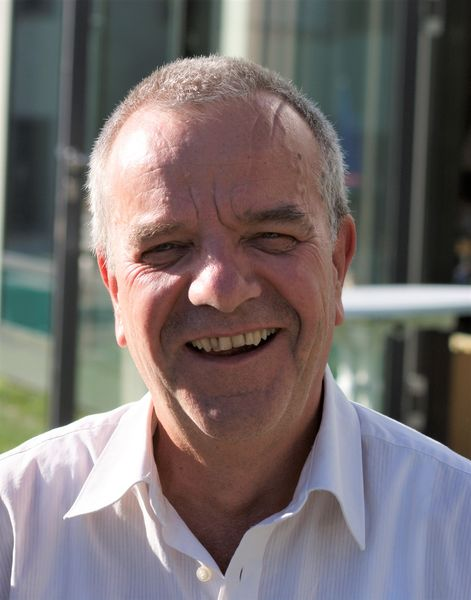
Michael Borgolte

Michael Borgolte (born 1948) is a German historian. Besides the history of medieval endowments he studies mainly the Comparative history of Europe and the Global history of the Middle Ages.

== Career ==
Borgolte was educated at the University of Münster, where he gained his doctorate in 1975. In 1981 he qualified as a professor at the University of Freiburg, where he was assistant to the palaeographer Johanne Authenrieth from 1975 onwards. in 1991 he was one of the first professors newly appointed to Humboldt-University after the Berlin Wall came down. He held the chair for Medieval History until 2018. Since 2007 Borgolte is a member of the Berlin-Brandenburgische Akademie der Wissenschaften and as such delegated to the scientific board of the Monumenta Germaniae Historica. Together with Bernd Schneidmüller he was coordinator of the research program SPP 1173 "Integration und Desintegration der Kulturen im europäischen Mittelalter", funded by the German Research Foundation. In 2011 he was awarded with an ERC Advanced Grant for his research program "Foundations in Medieval Societies — Crosscultural Comparisons". Collaborating with the Byzantinist Zachary Chitwood, the Indologist Annette Schmiedchen, the medieval historian Tillmann Lohse and others he prepared a three volume encyclopedia on this topic which promptly stimulated scholarly discussions.
