= Gerd Tellenbach =

German historian

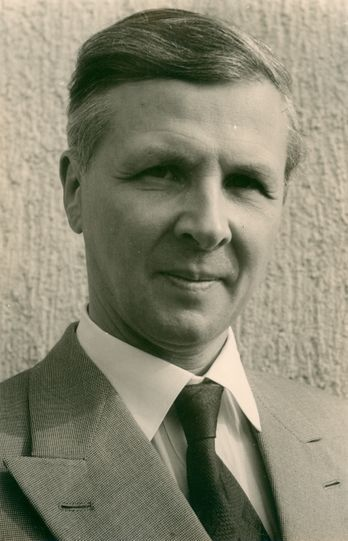
Portrait of Gerd Tellenbach

Gerd Tellenbach (17 September 1903 – 12 June 1999) was a German historian and scholar of medieval social and religious history, particularly of the Papacy and German church during the Investiture Controversy and reform movements of the eleventh and twelfth centuries. Tellenbach also made groundbreaking contributions to the study of the medieval nobility and helped establish a new field of research dedicated to mapping social networks and familial ties among medieval elites (Personenforschung). After studying history at the universities of Freiburg and Heidelberg, he taught in Gießen, Münster, and finally the Albert-Ludwigs-Universität in Freiburg, where he served as Rektor (chancellor) in 1949–1950 and again in 1957–1958. From 1962 to 1971, he was director of the German Historical Institute in Rome, a state-sponsored research center dedicated to German-Italian studies and the history of the Papacy in the Middle Ages.

== Scholarly influence ==
Given his extraordinarily long and productive career, Tellenbach ranks as one of the most influential German historians of the twentieth century. At Freiburg, as well as during his tenure as director of the German Historical Institute in Rome, he trained and served as a mentor to a large number of students of medieval history who went on to receive important academic chairs throughout Germany. His most famous student was Karl Schmid (1923–1993), who further developed Tellenbach's research on medieval noble families and pioneered important new techniques in prosopography and source criticism using monastic necrologies and memorial books. Tellenbach's intellectual formation before World War I, and his scholarly maturation following the catastrophe of the Second World War, also lent his scholarship a unique perspective. Tellenbach's research in church history, as well as in political and social history, broke with long-standing nationalistic and highly confessional and politicized accounts and instead stressed long-term structural changes as well as intellectual and cultural forces in society. His conception of the Investiture Controversy as an epochal clash of opposing ideologies about "right order in the world," (hierocratic vs. monarchic) was certainly formed as a young scholar witnessing the vicious political conflicts that engulfed the universities in the 1930s and 1940s. Throughout his career, and particularly in his publicly visible role as university Rektor, he remained a thoughtful and forceful advocate of academic and intellectual freedom as critical components of liberal democracy.

== Selected works ==
- Libertas. Kirche und Weltordnung im Zeitalter des Investiturstreits (Stuttgart, 1936); English trans.: Church, State and Christian Society at the Time of the Investiture Controversy (Oxford, 1938)
- "Vom karolingischen Reichsadel zum deutschen Reichsfürstenstand," in Adel und Bauer im deutschen Staat des Mittelalters, ed. Theodor Mayer (Leipzig, 1943)
- "Zur Erforschung des hochmittelalterlichen Adels (IX-XII Jh.), in XIIme Congres internationale des sciences historiques. Rapports I (Vienna, 1965)
- Die Westliche Kirche vom 10. bis frühen 12. Jahrhundert (Göttingen, 1988); English trans.: The church in western Europe from the tenth to the early twelfth century (Cambridge, 1993)
