= Waldo of Reichenau =

Carolingian bishop

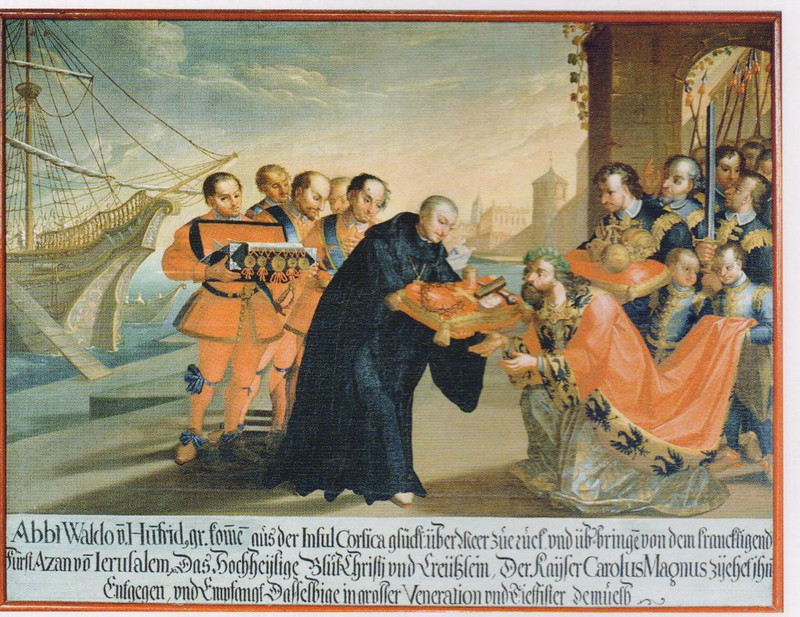
Waldo of Reichenau

Waldo of Reichenau (sometimes Walto) (c. 740 - 814, Paris) was an abbot and Carolingian official.

== Life ==
Waldo belonged to a noble Frankish family from Wetterau. His father was Richbold Count of Breisgau and his older brother was Rupert Baron von Aargau. He entered the Abbey of Reichenau in 784 under Abbot Peter, brother of Hildegard, Charlemagne's second wife.

Upon Peter's death in 786, Waldo succeeded him as abbot, a position he held until 806. Under Waldo, the library and scriptorium of Reichenau Abbey "grew to rival the finest in the Frankish kingdom". Waldo was instrumental in helping to establish a fraternal network among the various monastic schools. He sent the monk Odilleoz, brother of Haito, head of the monastic school at Reichenau, to Tours to study under Alcuin. Upon his return, Odilleoz brought manuscripts and other valuable objects from Alcuin.

Charlemagne placed him in charge of the Bishopric of Pavia and Basel in 791. According to Johannes Fried, Waldo served as one of the advisers of the young Pepin of Italy. In 806 Charlemagne made Waldo the abbot of Saint-Denis in Paris where he died in 814.

Walafrid Strabo's Liber de visionibus Wettini describes Waldo as performing penance in purgatory for inconsiderate deeds towards the monk Wetti of Reichenau, a teacher at Reichenau when he was abbot.

== Sources ==
- Lapidge, Michael (2017). Hilduin of Saint-Denis: The Passio S. Dionysii in Prose and Verse. Brill. ISBN 9789004343627.
- Fried, Johannes (2016). Charlemagne. Harvard University Press. ISBN 9780674973411.
