= Reichenau Abbey =

Coordinates: 47.6989°N 9.0624°E

UNESCO World Heritage Site
- Interactive map of Reichenau Abbey
- Part of: Monastic Island of Reichenau
- Criteria: Cultural: iii, iv, vi
- Reference: 974
- Inscription: 2000 (24th Session)

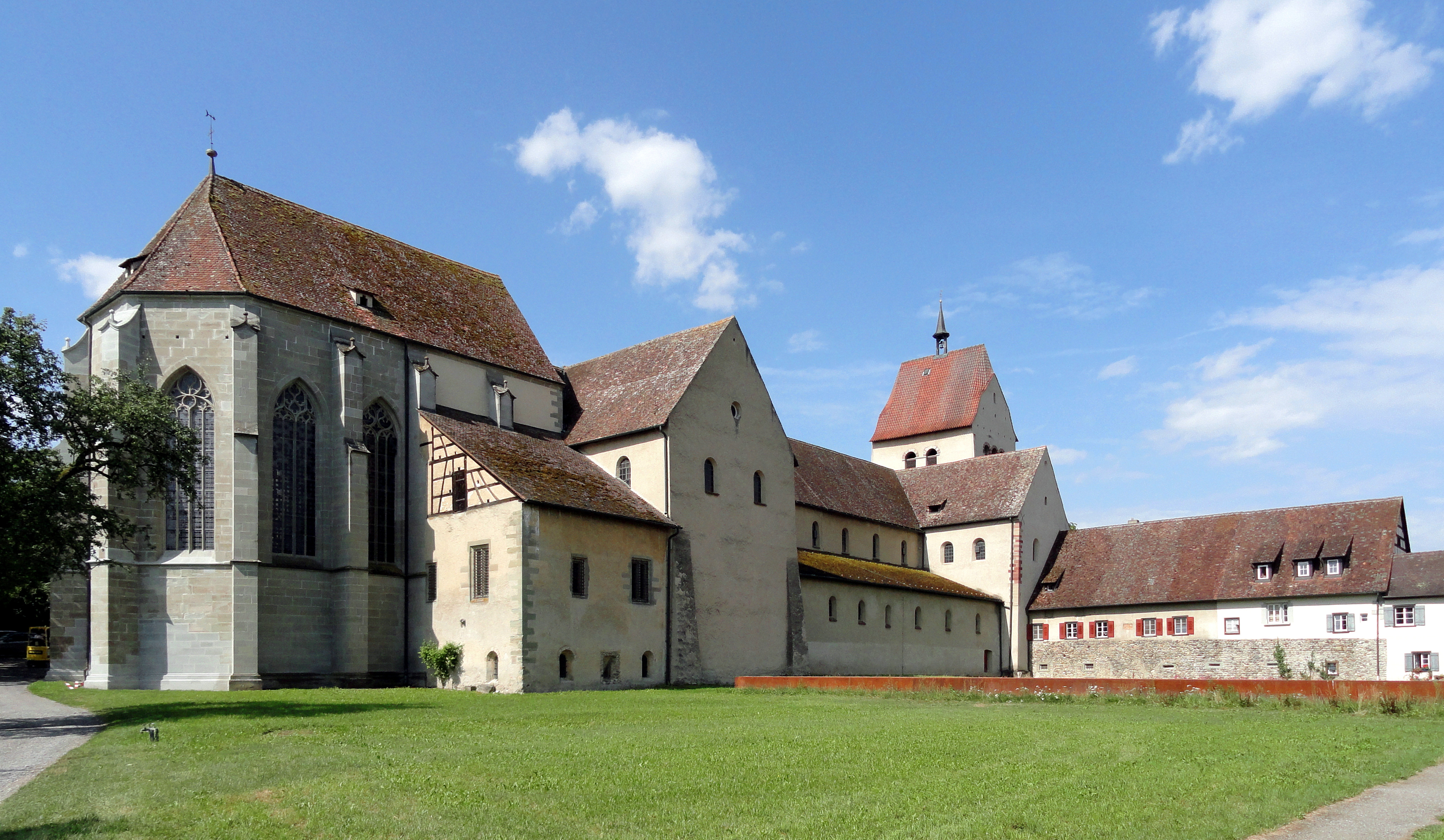
Monastery and cloisters of Reichenau, 2013

Reichenau Abbey was a Benedictine monastery on Reichenau Island (known in Latin as Augia Dives) in southern Germany. It was founded in 724 by the itinerant Saint Pirmin, who is said to have fled Visigothic Spain ahead of the Moorish invaders, with patronage that included Charles Martel, and, more locally, Count Berthold of the Ahalolfinger and the Alemannian duke Hnabi. Pirmin's conflict with Hnabi resulted in his leaving Reichenau in 727.

== History ==
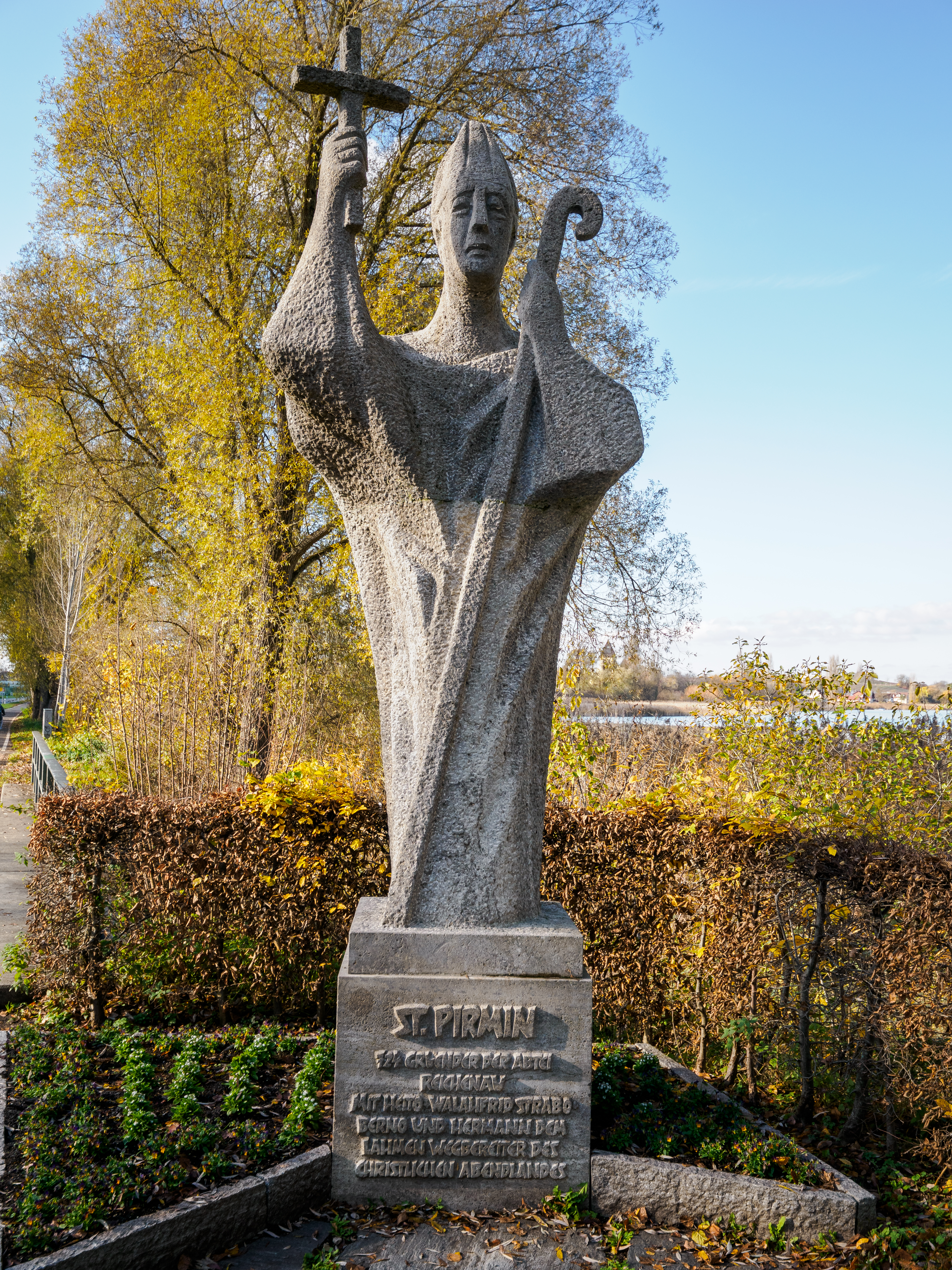
Monument of St. Pirminius, founder of Reichenau Abbey

Reichenau quickly developed into an influential religious, cultural, and intellectual center. Under Abbot Haito the monastery began to flourish. It gained influence in the Carolingian dynasty, under Abbot Waldo of Reichenau (740–814), by educating the clerks who staffed Imperial and ducal chanceries. Abbot Reginbert of Reichenau (died 846) built up the important book collection. Abbot Walahfrid Strabo (842–849), who was educated at Reichenau, was renowned as a poet and Latin scholar.

Reichenau was greatly fostered by its position on the highway to Italy, which was frequented by Greek and Italian, and even Irish and Icelandic pilgrims and wayfarers. The Abbey stood along a main north–south highway between Germany and Italy, where the lake passage eased the arduous route. The Abbey of Reichenau housed a school, and a scriptorium and artists' workshop, that has a claim to having been the largest and artistically most influential centre for producing lavishly illuminated manuscripts in Europe during the late 10th and early 11th centuries, often known as the Reichenau School. An example of the scriptorium's production is the Pericopes of Henry II, made for the Emperor, now in Munich. Walafrid Strabo was educated at Reichenau.

Bishop Egino of Verona resided in Reichenau, and built (799) the parish church of St. Peter at Niederzell, a small Roman basilica with two towers, whither he retired to lead the life of a hermit, dying in 802. The patronage of the Carolingians resulted in the rapid growth of the monastery in importance, being granted successively immunity from secular authority, jurisdictio fori the status of a principality of the empire, and complete exemption from episcopal jurisdiction. Reichenau has preserved its precious relics, which include the pitcher from the wedding at Cana.

The Abbey reached its apex under Abbot Berno of Reichenau (1008–48). During his time, important scholars, such as Hermannus Contractus, lived and worked in Reichenau. In the second half of the 11th century, the cultural importance of the Abbey started to wane owing to the restrictive reforms of Pope Gregory VII, and also to rivalry with the nearby St. Gall; in 1540, the Bishop of Constance, an old rival of the Reichenau abbots, became lord of Reichenau, and, under the control of the succeeding bishops, the abbey's significance dwindled.

When the abbey lands were secularized (initially in 1757 and permanently in 1803) and the monks disbanded under Napoleon, part of Reichenau's famed library was preserved in the state library (Landesbibliothek) at Karlsruhe. The Geographus Bavarus and several other important documents may be found in the Bavarian State Library in Munich. Since 2001 a small community of Benedictines has been re-established at Niederzell (Sts. Peter and Paul).

Because of its historical importance and exceptional art and architecture, Reichenau Abbey (along with other monuments on the island) was inscribed on the UNESCO World Heritage List in 2000.

In 2024, Deutsche Post issued stamp series and envelope commemorating 1300 years of Reichenau Monastery.

== List of abbots ==
- Pirminius (724–727)
- Heddo (727–734)
- Keba (734–736)
- Arnefrid, also bishop of Constance
- Sidonius, also bishop of Constance
- John (760–782), also bishop of Constance and abbot of Saint Gall
- Petrus (782–786)
- Waldo (786–806)
- Hatto I (806–823), also bishop of Basel
- Erlebald (823–838)
- Ruadhelm (838?–842)
- Walahfrid Strabo (838, 842–849)
- Folkwin (849–858)
- Walter (858–864)
- Hatto II (864–871)
- Ruodho (871–888)
- Hatto III (888–913), also archbishop of Mainz and abbot of Ellwangen, Lorsch and Weißenburg
- Hugh (913)
- Thieting (913–916)
- Heribrecht (916–926)
- Liuthard (926–934)
- Alawich I (934–958)
- Eggehard I (958–972)
- Ruodmann (972–985)
- Witigowo (985–997)
- Alawich II (997–1000)
- Werinher (1000–1006)
- Immo (1006–1008)
- Berno (1008–1048)
- Ulrich I (1048–1069)
- Meginwart (1069–1070)
- Ruopert (1071), also abbot of Michelsberg and Gengenbach
- Ekkehard von Nellenburg (1071–1088)
- Ulrich von Dapfen (1088–1123)
- Rudolf von Böttstein (1123–1131)
- Ludwig von Pfullendorf (1131–1135)
- Ulrich III von Zollern (1135–1136)
- Otto von Böttstein (1136–1139)
- Frideloh von Heidegg (1139–1159)
- Ulrich IV von Heidegg (1159–1169)
- Diethelm von Krenkingen (1169–1206)
- Hermann von Spaichingen (1206)
- Heinrich von Karpfen (1206–1234)
- Konrad von Zimmern (1234–1253/55)
- Burkhard von Hewen (1253/55–1259)
  - Berchtold von Falkenstein (1258–1259), coadjutor and abbot of Saint Gall
- Albrecht von Ramstein (1260–1294)
- Mangold von Veringen (1294–1295)
- Heinrich von Klingenberg (1296–1306), also bishop of Constance
- Diethelm von Castell (1306–1343), also abbot of Petershausen
- Eberhard von Brandis (1343–1379)
- Heinrich von Stöffeln (1379–1383)
- Mangold von Brandis (1383–1385)
- Werner von Rosenegg (1385–1402)
- Friedrich von Zollern (1402–1426/27)
- Heinrich von Hornberg (1426/27)
- Friedrich von Wartenberg (1427–1453)
- Johann von Hinwil (1454–1464)
- Johann Pfuser von Nordstetten (1464–1491)
- Martin von Weißenburg (1492–1508)
- Markus von Knöringen (1508–1515), first time
- Georg Fischer (1515–1519)
- Gallus Kalb (1519)
- Markus von Knöringen (1523–1540), second time

After 1540, the bishops of Constance were ex officio abbots.

== People of the abbey ==
=== Notable monks ===
- Berthold of Reichenau (died 1088)
- Hermann of Reichenau (1013–1054)
- Reginbert of Reichenau (died 846)
- Wetti of Reichenau (died 824)

=== Burials ===
- Gerold of Anglachgau
- Charles the Fat
- Burchard III, Duke of Swabia
- Herman I, Duke of Swabia

== Texts and manuscripts ==
- Chronicon Suevicum universale
- Reichenau confraternity book
- Reichenau Glossary
- Reichenau Primer
- Translatio sanguinis Domini

== See also ==
- List of Merovingian monasteries
