= Squinter =

Squinter can refer to:

- Guercino, Italian for squinter
- Strabo (disambiguation), Latin for squinter
- Gwich’in, known in French by the word for squinter (Loucheux)
