= Gesta Hammaburgensis ecclesiae pontificum =

Literary work

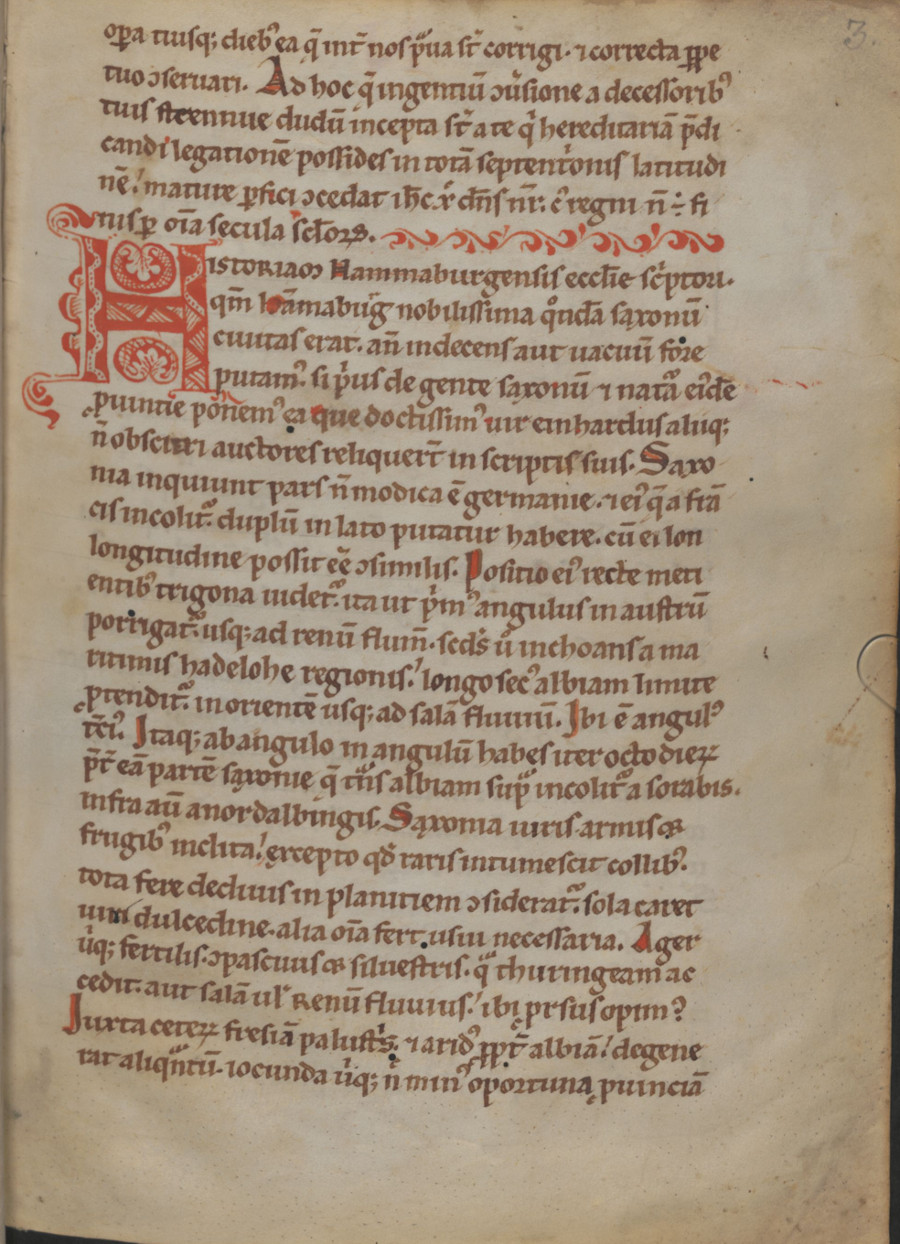
Beginning of Book 1 in the Vienna manuscript (Codex Vindobonensis 521, fol. 3r).

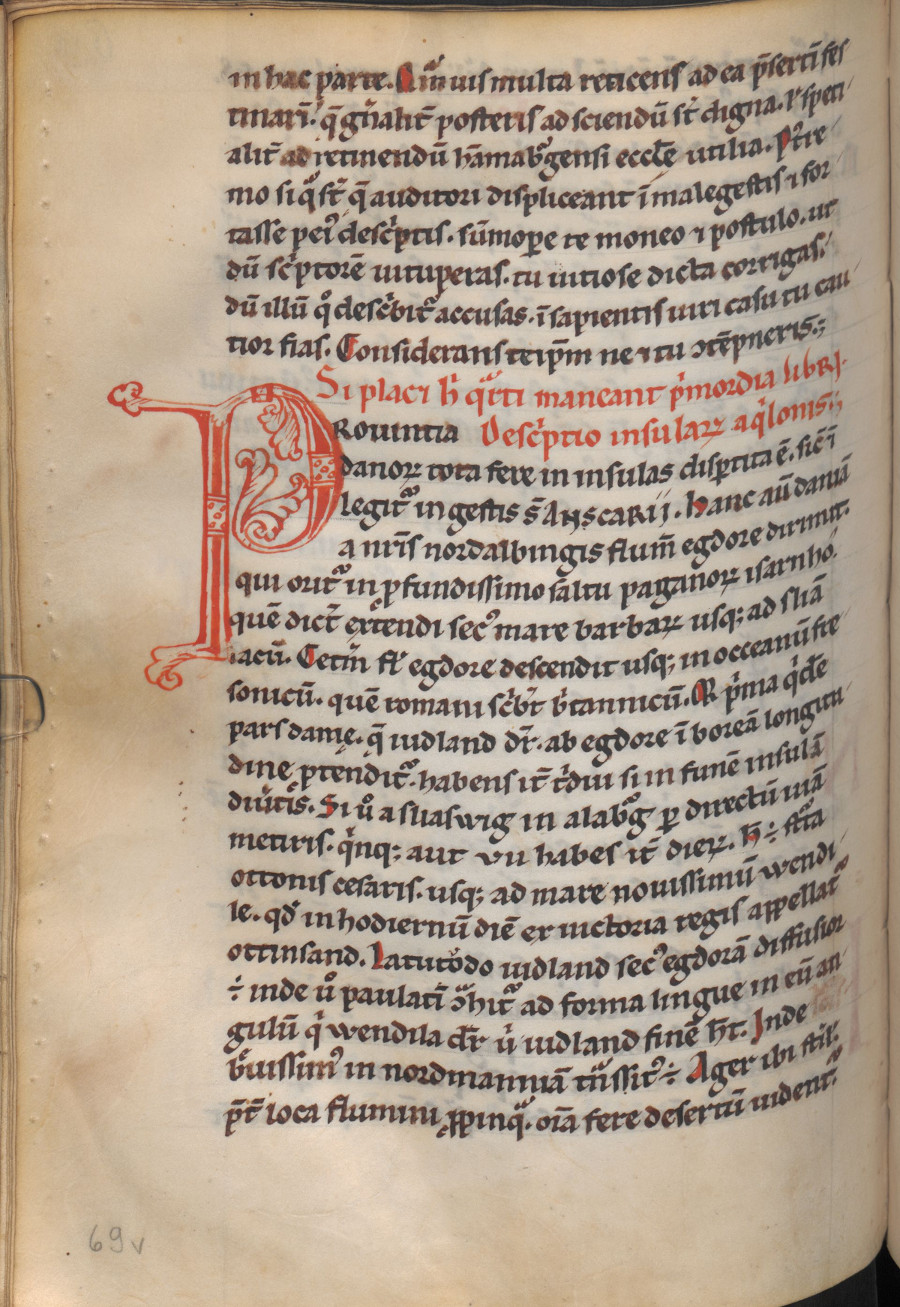
First page of the descriptio insularum aquilonis in the Vienna manuscript (Codex Vindobonensis 521, fol. 69v).

Gesta Hammaburgensis ecclesiae pontificum (Medieval Latin for "Deeds of the Bishops of Hamburg") is a historical treatise written between 1073 and 1076 by Adam of Bremen, who made additions (scholia) to the text until his death (possibly 1081; before 1085). It is one of the most important sources of the medieval history of Northern Europe, and the oldest textual source reporting the discovery of coastal North America.

It covers the entire period known as the Viking Age, from the foundation of the bishopric under Willehad in 788 until the rule of prince-bishop Adalbert in Adam's own time (1043–1072). The text focuses on the history of the Hamburg-Bremen diocese and its bishops. As the bishops had jurisdiction over the missions to Scandinavia, it also gives a report of the Norse paganism of the period.

The existence of the work was forgotten in the later medieval period, until it was re-discovered in the late 16th century in the library of Sorø Abbey, Denmark.

== Contents ==
The treatise consist of the following parts:

- An introduction, addressed to bishop Liemar
- Book 1: History of the bishopric of Bremen and (after 845) Hamburg-Bremen (788–940)
- Book 2: History of the archbishopric Hamburg-Bremen (940–1045)
- Book 3: Biography of archbishop Adalbert of Hamburg (r. 1043–1072)
- Book 4: Descriptio insularum aquilonis: Geographical description of Northern Europe
- M. Adami epilogus ad Liemarum episcopum: A dedication to bishop Liemar in hexameters

The text is one of the most important sources of Northern German and Scandinavian history and geography in the Viking Age and the beginning High Middle Ages. It covers the relations between Saxons, Wends (West Slavs) and Danes (Vikings). The third book is focused on the biography of archbishop Adalbert of Hamburg. Adam based his works in part on Einhard, Cassiodorus, and other earlier historians, consulting the library of the church of Bremen. The text as presented to bishop Liemar was completed in 1075/1076.

After the death of Bishop Leuderich (838–45), the see was given to Ansgar, it lost its independence, and from that time on was permanently united with the Archdiocese of Hamburg. The Archdiocese of Hamburg-Bremen was designated the "Mission of the North" and had jurisdiction over all missions in Scandinavia, and the entire scope of Viking expansion in the north (Russia, Iceland, Greenland), throughout the Viking Age, until the archbishop of Hamburg-Bremen had a falling-out with the pope, and separate archbishopric for the North was established in Lund in 1105.

Adam is also an important source of Viking Age Norse paganism, including the practice of human sacrifice:

"It is customary also to solemnize in Uppsala, at nine-year intervals, a general feast of all the provinces of Sweden. From attendance at this festival no one is exempted. Kings and people all and singly send their gifts to Uppsala and, what is more distressing than any kind of punishment, those who have already adopted Christianity redeem themselves through these ceremonies. The sacrifice is of this nature: of every living thing that is male, they offer nine heads, with the blood of which it is customary to placate gods of this sort. The bodies they hang in the sacred grove that adjoins the temple. Now this grove is so sacred in the eyes of the heathen that each and every tree in it is believed divine because of the death or putrefaction of the victims. Even dogs and horses hang there with men."

The description of the temple at Uppsala is one of the most famous excerpts of the Gesta:

"In this temple, entirely decked out in gold, the people worship the statues of three gods in such wise that the mightiest of them, Thor, occupies a throne in the middle of the chamber; Wodan and Frikko have places on either side. (…) Thor, they say, presides over the air, which governs the thunder and lightning, the winds and rains, fair weather [and] crops. The other, Wodan – that is, Fury [Wodan, id est furor] – carries on war and imparts to man strength against his enemies. The third is Frikko, who bestows peace and pleasure on mortals. His likeness, too, they fashion with an immense phallus."

The fourth book describes the geography of Scandinavia and the Baltic region. It mentions numerous episcopal seats and churches, including Meldorf, Schenefeld, Verden, Pahlen, Ratzeburg, Mecklenburg, Oldenburg in Holstein and Jumne. Beyond this, it gives a description of the coast of Scandinavia and of the "northern isles" including Iceland, Greenland and notably (in chapter 39) Vinland (North America), (Note: Adam mentions Vinland (Winland) in Chapter 39 of Book IV of his Gesta: Adam von Bremen (1917). Schmeidler, Bernhard (ed.). Hamburgische Kirchengeschichte [Hamburg's Church History] (in Latin and German). Hannover and Leipzig, Germany: Hahnsche. pp. 275–276. From pp. 275–276: "XXXVIIII. Praeterea unam adhuc insulam recitavit a multis in eo repertam oceano, quae dicitur Winland, eo quid ibi vites sponte nascantur, vinum optimum ferentes. Nam et fruges ibi non seminatas habundare, non fabulosa opinione, sed certa comperimus relatione Danorum. Post quam insulam, ait, terra non invenitur habitabilis in illo oceano, sed omnia, quae ultra sunt, glacie intolerabili ac caligine immensa plena sunt. Cujus rei Martianus ita meminit: Ultra Thilen, inquiens, navigatione unius diei mare concretum est. Temptavit hoc nuper experientissimus Nordmannorum princeps Haraldus. Qui latitudinem septentrionalis oceani perscrutatus navibus tandem caligantibus ante ora deficientis mundi finibus, inmane baratrum abyssi retroactis vestigiis vix salvus evasit." (39. In addition, he [i.e., Sweyn Estridsson, king of Denmark (reigned 1047–1076)] named one more island in this ocean, discovered by many, which is called "Vinland", because vines grow wild there, making the best wine. For [that] crops [that are] not sown, abound there, we learn not from fanciful opinion but from the true account of the Danes. Beyond which island, it is said, habitable land is not found in that ocean, but all [places] that are beyond, are filled with intolerable ice and boundless fog. About this subject Martianus [i.e., Martianus Capella (fl. ca. 410–420) in his De nuptiis Philologiae et Mercurii (On the Marriage of Philology and Mercury), Book VI, § 666] recalled: At one day's sailing beyond Thule, he says, the sea is frozen. Harald [i.e., Harald Hardrada (ca. 1015–1066), King of Norway], the most enterprising leader of the Normans, recently attempted [to go] to this place. [It was he] who – the extent of the northern ocean having been investigated by [his] ships – finally by withdrawing from the fogs before the edge at the world's end, barely escaped safely the vast abyss of Hell by reversing [his] tracks.)) being the oldest extant written record of the Norse discovery of North America. Adam of Bremen had been at the court of Danish king Sven Estridson and was informed about the Viking discoveries in the North Atlantic there.

== Author ==
Adam is believed to have come from Meissen (Latin Misnia) in the Margravate of Meissen. He was probably born before 1050 and died on 12 October of an unknown year (possibly 1081, at the latest 1085). From his chronicles it is apparent that he was familiar with a number of authors. The honorary name of Magister Adam shows that he had passed through all the stages of a higher education. It is probable that he was taught at the Magdeburger Domschule.

In 1066 or 1067 he was invited by archbishop Adalbert of Hamburg to join the Archdiocese of Hamburg-Bremen. Adam was accepted among the capitulars of Bremen, and by 1069 he appeared as director of the cathedral's school. Soon thereafter he began to write the history of Hamburg-Bremen and of the northern lands in his Gesta. His position and the missionary activity of the church of Hamburg-Bremen allowed him to gather information on the history and the geography of Northern Germany. A stay at the court of Svend Estridson gave him the opportunity to find information about the history and geography of Denmark and the other Scandinavian countries.

== Sources ==
Adam made use of a variety of sources. He had a preference for biographies over chronicles and annals. He had access to the biographies of the missionary saints Boniface, Ansgar, Liudger, Radbod, Rimbert, Willehad and Willibrord. He also made use of Einhard's Life of Charlemagne. His historical sources include Gregory of Tours's Historia Francorum and the Annals of Fulda, which he also calls the Historia Francorum. He had the Regensburg continuation of the latter, perhaps even a copy that had been amplified with other material. He also had an amplified version of the Annals of Corbie. He uses but does not name the Swabian World Chronicle and the Chronicle of Regino of Prüm. Three sources he cites appear to be lost: the Annales Caesarum, Gesta Francorum and Gesta Anglorum.

Among documentary sources, Adam had access to letters and charters, both papal and imperial. He also saw the confraternity book and the donation book of Bremen, begun under Ansgar. He was poor, however, at detecting forgeries. Among ecclesiastical texts, he used the False Decretals, the Decretum of Burchard of Worms and lost work by Abbot Bovo II of Corvey.

== Manuscript tradition ==
According to Schmeidler (1917), Adam created three versions of the text, in the convention of Schmeidler (1917) labelled

- (A) representing his preliminary text,
- (a) the work as given to bishop Liemar, and
- (X) which he kept for his own use and supplemented with various additions (scholia).

None of the three archetypes has been preserved. The most relevant surviving manuscripts are classified into three groups, labelled A, B and C.

The best manuscript is of group A, labelled A1 (National Library Vienna, cod. 521), dated to the first half of the 13th century. Parts of book 2, book 4 and some scholia are also preserved in a ms. dated c. 1100 (Leiden University Library, Codex Vossianus Latinus, VLQ 123).

Manuscripts in the B and C groups are derived from version X. They contain independent additions of scholia. The best ms. in group B was the so-called Codex z, written 1161/2, which was however lost in the Copenhagen Fire of 1728. Some copies of this ms. are extant. The best ms. in group C, labelled C1, is at the Copenhagen Royal Library, Old Royal Collection, No. 2296 quarto (dated c. 1230).

== Editions ==
The editio princeps was printed in 1595 after the now-lost ms. C2 by Erpold Lindenberg. It was reprinted as Scriptores rerum septentrionalium in 1609 and 1630. The fourth book was edited by Johannes Messinus in Stockholm in 1615, and by Stephanus Johannes Stephanius in Leiden in 1629. A revised edition by Joachim Johannes Mader appeared in Helmstedt in 1670, reprinted 1706 by J. A. Fabricius in Hamburg.

The first critical edition, based on ms. A1, is due to Johann Martin Lappenberg, published 1846. It was included in the Monumenta Germaniae Historica series, appearing in a revised edition by Georg Waitz in 1876, and edited by Migne in 1884 (PL 146). The edition by Bernhard Schmeidler (1917, reprinted 1977, 1993) remains current.

== See also ==
- Gesta Danorum
- Chronicon Slavorum
- Duchy of Saxony
- Vinland
- Birca

== Sources ==
- Trillmich, Werner, ed. (1961). "Magistri Adam Bremensis, Gesta Hammaburgensis ecclesiae Pontificum: Adam von Bremen, Bischofsgeschichte der Hamburger Kirche". Quellen des 9. und 11. Jahrhunderts zur Geschichte der hamburgischen Kirche und des Reiches. Darmstadt: Wissenschaftliche Buchgesellschaft. pp. 135–503.
- Tschan, Francis J., ed. (1959). Adam of Bremen: History of the Archbishops of Hamburg-Bremen. New York: Columbia University Press.
  - Tschan, Francis J., ed. (2002) [1959]. Adam of Bremen: History of the Archbishops of Hamburg-Bremen (2nd ed.). New York: Columbia University Press. (also archived)
- Schmeidler, Bernhard, ed. (1917). Adam von Bremen: Hamburgische Kirchengeschichte. Hannover & Leipzig: Hahnsche Buchhandlung. (also archived)
- ed. Waitz (1876) Gesta Hammaburgensis Pontificum Liber I (Wikisource) (phys.msu.ru) Archived 2007-12-23 at the Wayback Machine Georg Heinrich Pertz et al. (ed.): Scriptores (in Folio) 7: Chronica et gesta aevi Salici. Hanover, 1846, pp. 267–389 (Monumenta Germaniae Historica, 267 digitalised)
- Erpold Lindenbrog, Johann Albert Fabricius, Scriptores rerum Germanicarum septeatrionalium sumptu C. Liebezeit, 1706 (google books).
- J. C. M. Laurent,Hamburgische Kirchengeschichte|Adams von Bremen Hamburgische Kirchengeschichte (1893) (wikisource)
- Linda Kalhjundi: Waiting for the Barbarians: the imagery, dynamics and functions of the Other in Northern German missionary chronicles, 11th-early 13th centuries: the Gestae hammaburgensis ecclesiae pontificum of Adam of Bremen, Chronica Slavorum of Helmold of Bosau, Chronica Slavorum of Arnold of Lübeck, and Chronicon Livoniae of Henry of Livonia, dissertation, Tartu, 2005 (utlib.ee)
- Adami Bremensis Gesta Hammaburgensis Ecclesiae Pontificum. Codex Havniensis. Published in photolithography with preface by C. A. Christensen. Copenhagen: Rosenkilde and Bagger, 1948 (Ms. Copenhagen, Old Royal Collection 2296 quarto, c. 1230, Schmeidler's C1); Ludwig Bieler, review, Speculum 24.2, April 1949, 256f.
- Edition of the Gesta by Bernhard Schmeidler, Digitale Bibliothek der Monumenta Germaniae Historica 1917, including current edition of the Latin text
- Adam of Bremen, Allgemeine Deutsche Biographie, online text. German.
- Adam of Bremen, Gesta Hammaburgensis ecclesiae pontificum, online text. Latin.
