= Saint Gall =

Irish disciple and saint

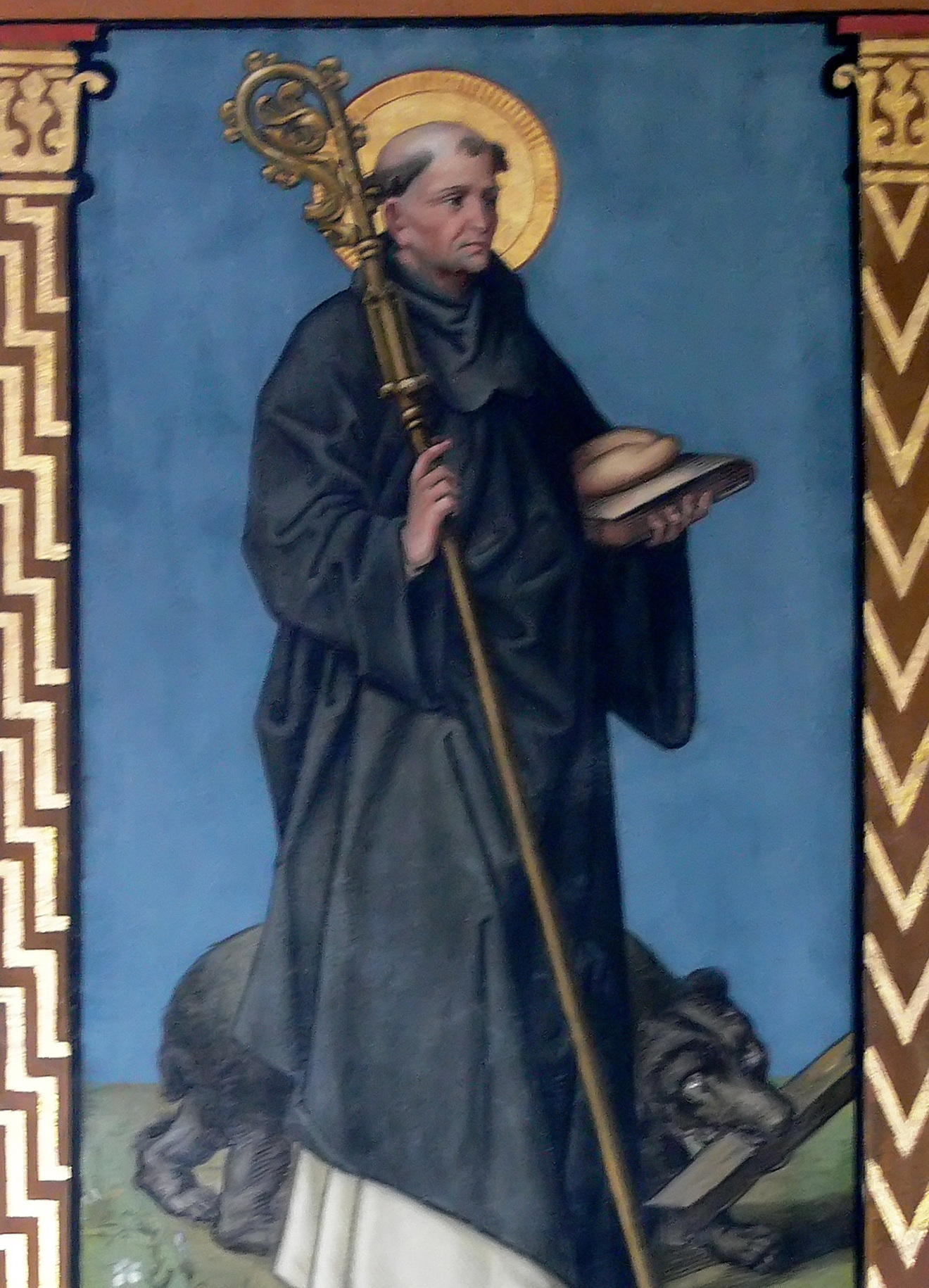
- Saint Gall

Patron of Saint Gall Apostle of North-east Switzerland and Alemannia
- Born: c. 550; Ireland (traditional attribution; see text)
- Died: c. 645; Arbon
- Venerated in: Catholic Church; Eastern Orthodox Church; Church of Ireland
- Major shrine: Abbey of Saint Gall
- Feast: 16 October
- Attributes: Portrayed as an abbot blessing a bear that brings him a log of wood; may be shown holding a hermit's tau staff with the bear or carrying a loaf and a pilgrim's staff.
- Patronage: birds, geese, poultry, Switzerland, St. Gallen

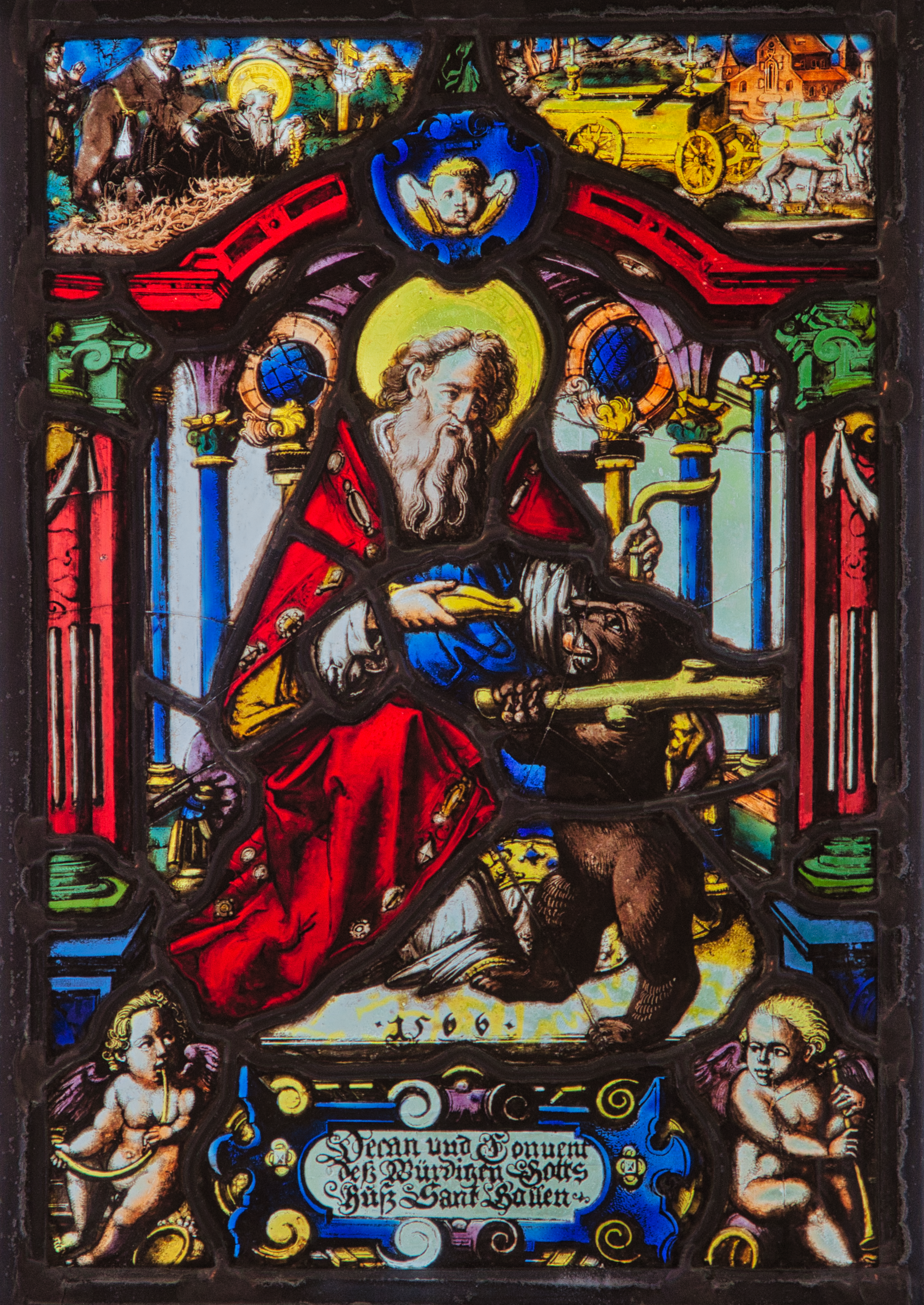
Stained-glass disc showing Saint Gall as dean, dated 1566

Gall (Latin: Gallus; c. 550 – c. 645) according to hagiographic tradition was a disciple and one of the traditional twelve companions of Columbanus on his mission from Ireland to the continent. However, he may have originally come from the border region between Lorraine and Alemannia and only met Columbanus at the monastery of Luxeuil in the Vosges. Gall is known as a representative of the Irish monastic tradition. The Abbey of Saint Gall in the city of Saint Gallen, Switzerland was built upon his original hermitage. Deicolus was the elder brother of Gall.

== Biography ==
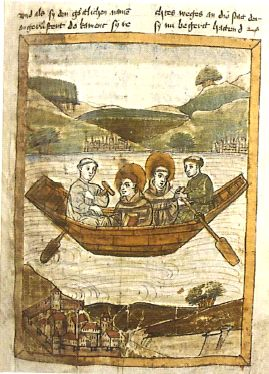
Columbanus and Saint Gall on Lake Constance (Bodensee), from a 15th-century manuscript

The fragmentary oldest Life was recast in the 9th century by two monks of Reichenau, enlarged in 816–824 by Wettinus, and about 833–884 by Walafrid Strabo, who also revised a book of the miracles of the saint. Other works ascribed to Walafrid tell of Saint Gall in prose and verse.

Gall's origin is a matter of dispute. According to his 9th-century biographers in Reichenau, he was from Ireland and entered Europe as a companion of Columbanus. The Irish origin of the historical Gallus was called into question by Hilty (2001), who proposed it as more likely that he was from the Vosges or Alsace region. Schär (2010) proposed that Gall may have been of Irish descent but born and raised in the Alsace.

According to the 9th-century hagiographies, Gall as a young man went to study under Comgall of Bangor Abbey. The monastery at Bangor had become renowned throughout Europe as a great centre of Christian learning. Studying in Bangor at the same time as Gall was Columbanus, who with twelve companions, set out about the year 589.

Gall and his companions established themselves with Columbanus at first at Luxeuil in Gaul. In 610, Columbanus was exiled by leaders opposed to Christianity and fled with Gall to Alemannia. He accompanied Columbanus on his voyage up the Rhine River to Bregenz but when in 612 Columbanus travelled on to Italy from Bregenz, Gall had to remain behind due to illness and was nursed at Arbon. He remained in Alemannia, where, with several companions, he led the life of a hermit in the forests southwest of Lake Constance, near the source of the river Steinach. Cells were soon added for twelve monks whom Gall carefully instructed. Gall was soon known in Switzerland as a powerful preacher.

When the See of Constance became vacant, the clergy who assembled to elect a new bishop were unanimously in favour of Gall. He, however, refused, pleading that the election of a stranger would be contrary to church law. Some time later, in the year 625, on the death of Eustasius, abbott of Luxeuil, a monastery founded by Columbanus, members of that community were sent by the monks to request Gall to undertake the government of the monastery. He refused to quit his life of solitude, and undertake any office of rank which might involve him in the cares of the world. He was then an old man.

He died at the age of ninety-five around 645–650 in Arbon.

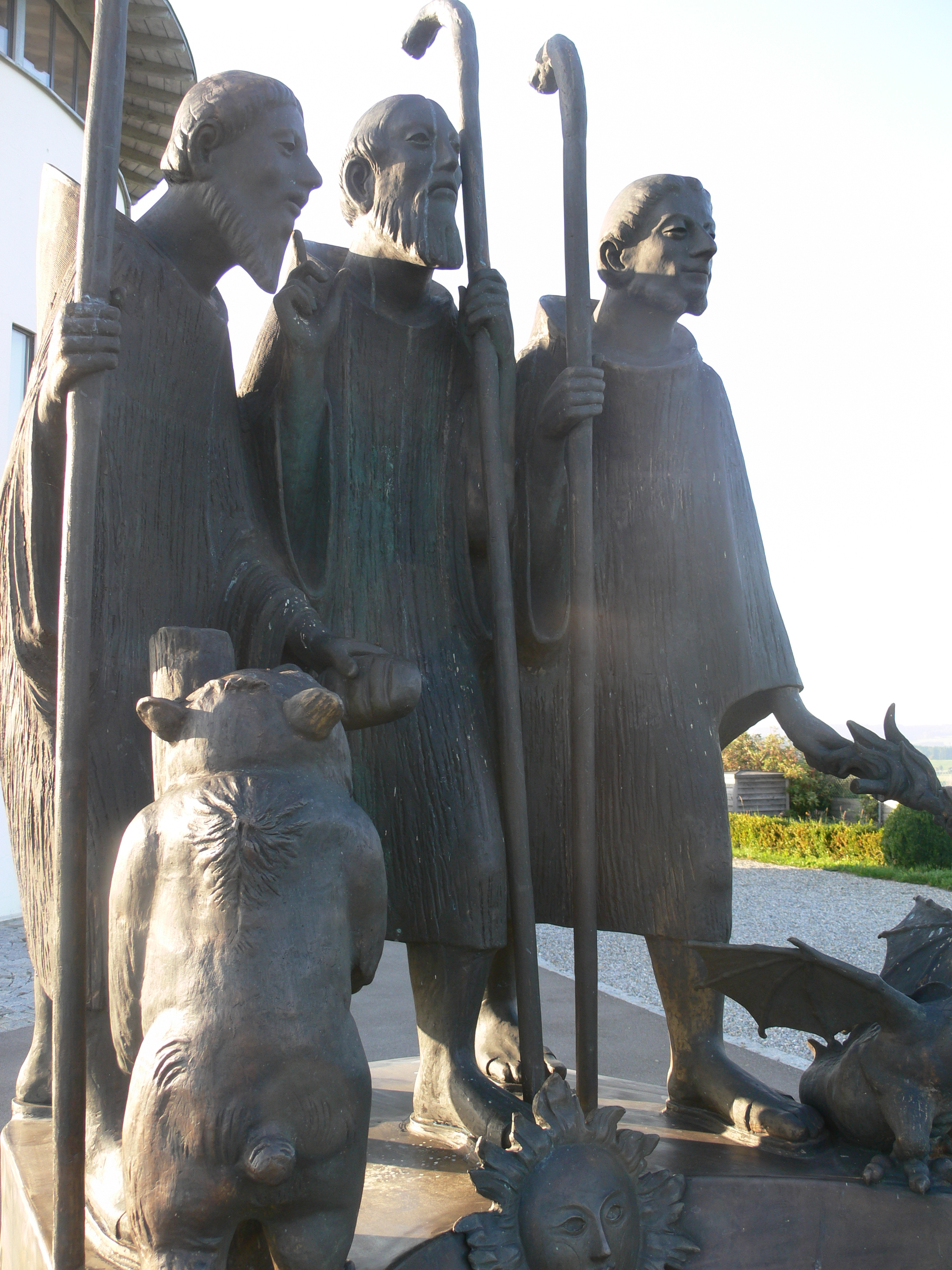
Gall, Columbanus, and Magnus: Autobahnkapelle

== Hagiography ==
From as early as the 9th century a series of Lives of Saint Gall were circulated. Prominent was the story in which Gall delivered Fridiburga from the demon by which she was possessed. Fridiburga was the betrothed of Sigebert II, King of the Franks, who had granted an estate at Arbon (which belonged to the royal treasury) to Gall so that he might found a monastery there.

Another popular story has it that as Gall was travelling in the woods of what is now Switzerland he was sitting one evening warming his hands at a fire. A bear emerged from the woods and charged. The holy man rebuked the bear, so awed by his presence it stopped its attack and slunk off to the trees. There it gathered firewood before returning to share the heat of the fire with Gall. The legend says that for the rest of his days Gall was followed around by his companion the bear.

== Veneration ==
His feast is celebrated on 16 October.

== Iconography ==
Images of Saint Gall typically represent him standing with a bear.

== Legacy ==
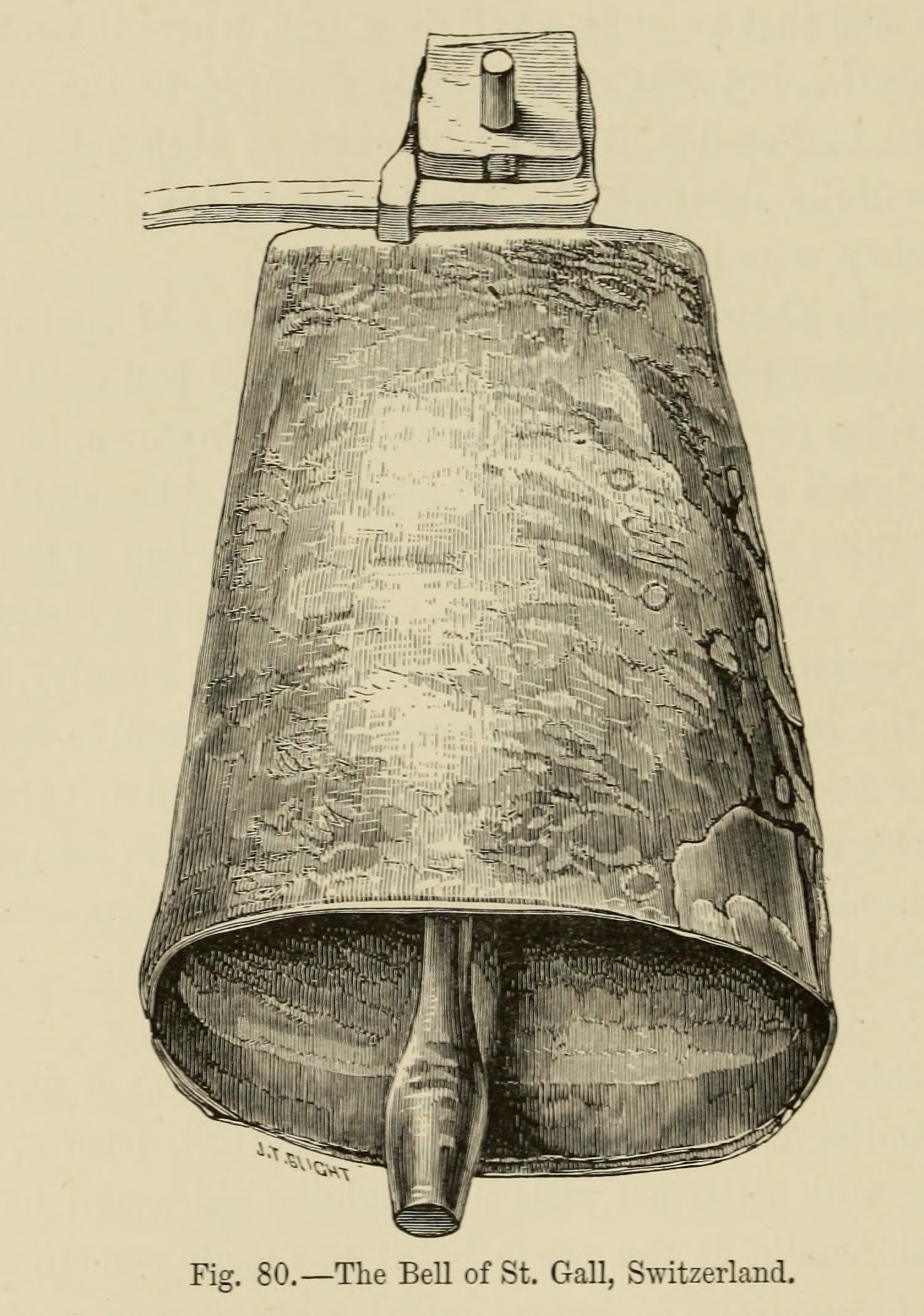
Bell of Saint Gall. Brought with him when he helped bring Christianity from Ireland to Switzerland, founding an abbey.

When Columbanus, Gall and their companions left Ireland for mainland Europe, they took with them learning and the written word. Their effect on the historical record was significant as the books were painstakingly reproduced on vellum by monks across Europe. Many of the Irish texts destroyed in Ireland during Viking raids were preserved in Abbeys across the channel.

=== Abbey of St. Gall ===
For several decades after his death, Gall's hermit cell remained; his disciples remained together in the cell he had built and followed the rule of St. Columban, combining prayer with work of the hands and reading with teaching. In 719, St. Otmar, the brotherhood's first abbot, extended Gall's cell into the Abbey of St. Gall, which became the nucleus of the Canton of St. Gallen in eastern Switzerland. The abbey followed the rule of St. Benedict of Nursia beginning in 747. As many as 53 monks joined the order under St. Otmar and the community grew to acquire land in Thurgau, the region of Zurich and Alemannia, up to the River Neckar. In the second half of the 8th century, the community continued to grow but became legally dependent on the Bishop of Constance. After an extended conflict with the see of Constance, the Abbey of St. Gallen regained its independence in the 9th century when Emperor Louis the Pious made it a royal monastery. The Abbey's monastery and especially its celebrated scriptorium (evidenced from 760 onwards) played an illustrious part in Catholic and intellectual history until it was secularised in 1798. It is very likely that Gall kept a small library of books for himself and his disciples for their liturgical worship. Following his death and the establishment of his tomb, the brotherhood of priests gathered there likely added to this small collection of books. These books would become the basis for the Abbey Library of Saint Gall.

=== Church of St. Havel ===
In Bohemian lands (modern day Czech Republic), Gall was known as St. Havel. Wenceslas I built a church in his honor in Prague shortly after his coronation in 1230, as well as the area of "Havel Town" around it.

== In popular culture ==
St Gall is the name of a wheel shaped hard cheese made from the milk of Friesian cows, which won a Gold Medal at the World Cheese Awards held in Dublin 2008.

Robertson Davies, in his book, The Manticore, interprets the legend in Jungian psychological terms. In the final scene of the novel where David Staunton is celebrating Christmas with Lizelloti Fitziputli, Magnus Eisengrim, and Dunstan Ramsay he is given a gingerbread bear. Ramsay explains that Gall made a pact of peace with a bear who was terrorizing the citizens of the nearby village. They would feed him gingerbread and he would refrain from eating them. The parable is presented as a Jungian exhortation to make peace with one's dark side.

== See also ==
- List of Orthodox saints
- List of Catholic saints

== Bibliography ==
- Joynt, Maud, tr. and ed., The Life of St Gall, Llanerch Press, Burnham-on-Sea, 1927. ISBN 0-947992-91-X
- Schär, Max, Gallus. Der Heikiger in seiner Zeit, Schwabe Verlag, Basle, 2011. ISBN 978-3-7965-2749-4
- Schmid, Christian, Gallusland. Auf den Spuren des heiligen Gallus, Paulus Verlag, Fribourg, 2011. ISBN 978-3-7228-0794-2
- Music and musicians in medieval Irish society, Ann Buckley, pp. 165–190, Early Music xxviii, no.2, May 2000
- Music in Prehistoric and Medieval Ireland, Ann Buckley, pp. 744–813, in A New History of Ireland, volume one, Oxford, 2005
