= Haito =

Swabian monk and bishop

Haito (or Hatto or Heito) (764 – 17 March 836) was the bishop of Basel from 802 and simultaneously abbot of Reichenau Abbey from 806.

== Life ==
Haito was born in 764. At the age of five, along with his brother Wadilcoz, he entered the Abbey of Reichenau, on an island in Lake Constance. Abbot Waldo (786-806) made him head of the monastic school, and in this capacity he did much for the instruction and classical training of the monks, as well as for the growth of the library. The Abbey gained influence in the Carolingian dynasty by educating the clerks who staffed Imperial and ducal chanceries.

As a substitute for Abbot Waldo, who was often absent in the service of Charlemagne and who, as Bishop of Pavia, also administered the bishopric of Basel, Haito grew into the position of abbot on the Reichenau at an early age. In 802 he became Bishop of Basel.

When Waldo was transferred to the Abbey of Saint Denis, near Paris, in 806, Haito was made Abbot of Reichenau, and about the same time bishop of Basel. The so-called Murbach statutes, long attributed to Murbach Abbey because of their tradition, are actually Haito's, implementing regulations for the Aachen reform plans of 816 for the monastery of Reichenau.

He enjoyed the confidence of the emperor Charlemagne and in 811 was both witness to the emperor's last will and was sent with others to Constantinople on a diplomatic mission, which he fulfilled to the satisfaction of his master. The interests of his diocese and abbey were not neglected. He rebuilt the cathedral of Basel and the abbey church of Reichenau, and issued appropriate instructions for the guidance of clergy and people in the ways of religion.

In 816 the abbey was rebuilt in a cruciform basilica style; he consecrated the Marienmünster and the Church of St. Mark in Mittelzell. That same year, he took part in the Aachen Reform Synod, called to establish regulations for the monastic life in the Frankish realm.

In 823 he resigned both positions, owing to serious infirmities, and spent the remainder of his life as a simple monk in the monastery of Reichenau where he died on 17 March 836.

== Writings ==
Haito was the author of several works. He wrote an account of his journey to Constantinople, the Hodoeporicon, of which, however, no trace has been found so far.

In 824 he wrote the Visio Wettini, in which he relates the spiritual experiences of Wettin, president of the monastic school of Reicheneau. The day before his death (4 November 824) Wettin saw in a vision bad and good spirits; an angel took him through hell, purgatory, and heaven, and showed him the torments of the sinners and the joys of the saints. The book, which bears some resemblance to Dante's Divina Commedia, was soon afterwards put into verse by Walafrid Strabo (Mon. Germ. Hist., loc. cit.).

While Bishop of Basel, he issued a number of regulations in twenty-five chapters, known as the Capitulare Haitonis, in which he legislated on matters of diocesan discipline. Priests should lead exemplary lives and be able to preach in both Latin and the vernacular. They were forbidden to live with women and stay in taverns. The statutes were probably published at a synod.

The copy of the so-called St. Gall monastery plan can be traced back to his initiative. Haito is an outstanding example of the close connection between ecclesiastical, political and scholarly activity in the Carolingian Empire.
