= Berchtold von Falkenstein =

Former Abbot of the Benedictine Abbey of Saint Gall in St. Gallen, Switzerland (d.1272)

Berchtold von Falkenstein (died 10 June 1272) was abbot of the Benedictine Abbey of Saint Gall from 1244 until 1272.

Berchtold von Falkenstein, son of Eigelwart I from the noble family of Falkenstein was initially a monk and porter in the Benedictine Abbey of Saint Gall and succeeded Abbot Walter von Trauchburg (1239–1244) after his abdication (1244–1272). The tenure of abbot Berchtold was marked by economic struggles and feudal wars around the area of the monastic community of Saint Gall. Even before his tenure, the city of Wil had been occupied by the counts of Toggenburg, who had to surrender to Berchtold after five weeks of siege in early 1245. This would not be the last struggle with the Toggenburgs.

In a dispute between the Staufian emperor and the papacy, Berchtold sided with the pope, for which he received a number of benefits at the council of Lyon. For example, on 15 May 1247 he received the right to use the pontifical vestments. On 7 September 1248, Pope Innocent IV (1243–1254) entrusted him with the role of administrator of Rheinau Abbey. Berchtold was also interested in Reichenau Abbey and got Pope Alexander IV (1254–1261) to give Reichenau Abbey into his administrative control in a document from 6 February 1258. In 1258, Berchtold was involved in disputes with the bishop of Constance, Eberhard II (1248–1274). They reached conciliation in a meeting in Viterbo by electing a new abbot for Reichenau, Albrecht von Ramstein (1260-1294, a relative of Berchtold's). Berchtold was away on imperial business from June to November 1257; he travelled to Castile to offer the German crown to the local king Alfonso X, the Wise (1252–1284). Before his departure, Berchtold established an anniversary foundation for his parents. In the following years, the interregnum (1257–1273) was characterised by the double kingship of Alfonso of Castile (1257–1282) and Richard of Cornwall (1257–1272).

Berchtold's politics around the security of the monastery, monastic property, and monastic rights was characterised by feuds in the 1260s. The abbot had to defend against claims of the Habsburgs (settlement of 16 July 1271), strengthened Saint Gall's position in Thurgau and in the Rhine Valley and acquired the city of Lichtensteig in 1271 as a forfeit from the Toggenburgs. The outward facing changes were accompanied by an inner tightening of administration. The financial situation of the abbey remained stable despite Berchtold’s feuds. This was achieved by exploiting the abbey’s inhabitants with unreasonably high tax increases.

The abbot could and would not do much against the way of life of nobility in the Abbey, though he did discipline some of the canons. Berchtold saw himself as a "church ruler" (Kirchenfürst) and a leader of a "church state" (Kirchenstaat). He was followed – as for example at the meeting in Viterbo of 1258 or at Christmas 1271 – by a large entourage of knights and feudatories. Despite his noble and martial way of life, Berchtold was preoccupied with sorrow for his abbey and other churches and was filled with piety. He died after a long time of sickness on 10 June 1272.

== Reading list ==
- Berchtold von Falkenstein, in: Helvetia Sacra III/1/2 (1986), pp. 1301–1303.
- H. Harter: Adel und Burgen im oberen Kinziggebiet. Studien zur Besiedlung und hochmittelalterlichen Herrschaftsbildung im mittelalterlichen Schwarzwald. (= FOLG 37), Freiburg i.Br.-München 1992.
- H. Harter: Adel auf Falkenstein und Schilteck. in: Schramberg. Herrschaft – Markflecken – Industriestadt. Schramberg 2004, pp. 55–82.
- M. Buhlmann: Das Kloster St. Georgen im Schwarzwald und die Herren von Falkenstein. in: Vertex Alemanniae. H. 26, St. Georgen 2007.
- "Falkenstein, Berchtold von" in German, French and Italian in the online Historical Dictionary of Switzerland.
- Paul Kläui (1955). "Berthold von Falkenstein". Neue Deutsche Biographie (in German). Vol. 2. Berlin: Duncker & Humblot. pp. 154–155. (full text online).
- Gerold Meyer von Knonau (1875). "Berthold (Abt von St. Gallen)" . Allgemeine Deutsche Biographie (in German). Vol. 2. Leipzig: Duncker & Humblot. p. 521.
