= Translatio sanguinis Domini =

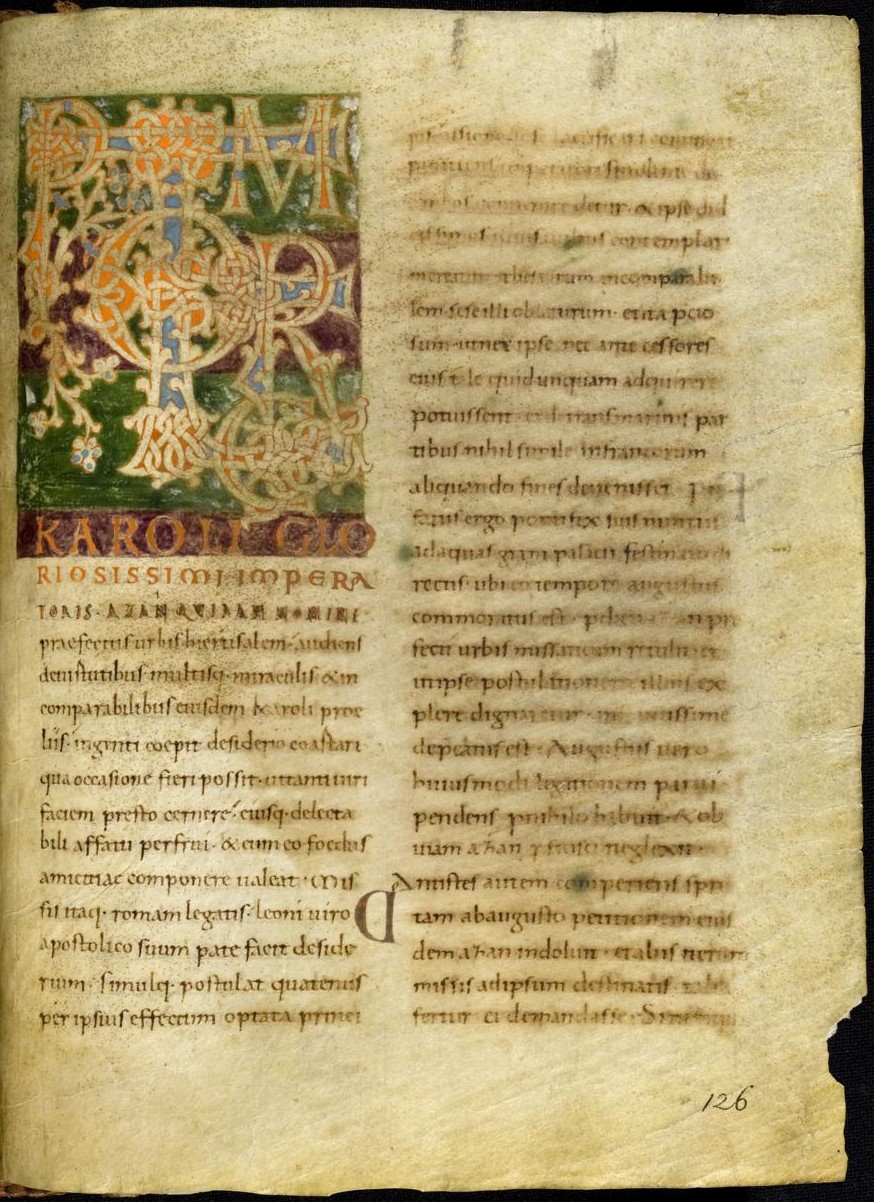
Start of the Translatio in the tenth-century manuscript

The Translatio sanguinis Domini (or De pretioso sanguine Domini nostri, BHL 4152) is a short Latin text that was composed at the Abbey of Reichenau around 925. It records how several relics associated with Jesus, including drops of his blood, wound up at Reichenau. It is a largely fictional account. There exists one tenth-century manuscript and three later manuscript copies. In the eleventh century, it was incorporated into the chronicles of Marianus Scotus and Sigebert of Gembloux.

According to the Translatio, Azan, the prefect of Jerusalem, having heard about Charlemagnes virtues, miracles and victories in battle, wishes to see the emperor in person and sign a treaty of friendship. He approaches Pope Leo III to arrange a meeting, offering Charlemagne "gifts greater than anything ever before brought to the West", but the emperor rejects the overture. The pope, who understands that it is relics of Jesus that are in view, sends messengers to the emperor, saying, "if ... you are proclaimed as the most famous in the whole universe, you ought to give your life over to danger, if the situation demands it, and walk on foot after him to procure so magnificent a treasure." Charlemagne relents, but Azan falls ill in Corsica. The emperor sends envoys to meet him because of his own fear of sea travel. In the guise of a pilgrim, Charlemagne walks barefoot from Ravenna to Sicily, where he finally meets Azan and receives the relics in an onyx reliquary. They include the drops of blood, a piece of the True Cross, a thorn from the crown of thorns, one of the holy nails and a piece of the Holy Sepulcher. He sends most of them to the palace chapel in Aachen, but the blood he sends to Reichenau.

The story in the Translatio takes as its basis the real Abbasid–Carolingian diplomacy that took place under Charlemagne. The character of Azan is based on Hassan, the real Muslim prefect of Huesca, who sent Charlemagne tribute in 799, according to the Royal Frankish Annals. This passage in the Annals follows an account of how Patriarch George of Jerusalem sent Charlemagne gifts on behalf of the Caliph Harun al-Rashid. In a later entry for 804, Charlemagne verifies the discovery of a blood relic in the Mantua.

Morally, the Translatio extols the pope, whose intervention was necessary to bring about the transfer of the relics, at the expense of Charlemagne. Politically, it presents Charlemagne as the true emperor recognized in Jerusalem and admired by the whole world, implicitly denigrating the Byzantine Emperor.
