= Strabo (disambiguation) =

Strabo ('squinter') was a term given by the Romans to anyone whose eyes were distorted or crooked or affected by strabismus.

== People ==
- Strabo, Greek historian and geographer (c. 64 BC–24 AD), the most famous figure bearing this name
- Gnaeus Pompeius Strabo (d. 87 BC), Roman consul and general, father of Pompey the Great
- Gaius Julius Caesar Strabo Vopiscus (c. 130 BC–87 BC), Roman politician and playwright
- Lucius Seius Strabo (46 BC–16 AD), Praetorian prefect and father of Sejanus
- Walahfrid Strabo (c. 808–849), Frankish theologian
- Theodoric Strabo (d. 481), Ostrogoth chieftain

== In fiction ==
- Landover (Magic Kingdom)#Strabo, a dragon in the Magic Kingdom of Landover series of fantasy novels

== Places ==
- Strabo (crater), a lunar crater
