= Chronicon Suevicum universale =

The Chronicon Suevicum universale (German: Schwäbische Weltchronik, "Swabian World Chronicle"), written around 1045 in Latin, is a chronicle of universal history in the form of annals for the years from Creation down to 1043. It was once commonly associated with the monastery of Saint Gall, but is now thought to have been composed by a monk of Reichenau. On the first hypothesis, it has been called the Epitome Sangallense Herimanni Augiensis, a Saint Gall version of Hermann of Reichenau's chronicle. On the second, it has been called the Reichenauer Weltchronik.

== Sources ==
- Bresslau, Harry (1881). "Chronicon Suevicum universale". Monumenta Germaniae Historica. Vol. Scriptores 13. Hanover. pp. 61–72.
- Tomaszek, Michal (2013). "Chronicon Suevicum universale". Encyclopedia of the Medieval Chronicle. Brill Online.
