= Wetti of Reichenau =

Benedictine monk, scholar, and educator

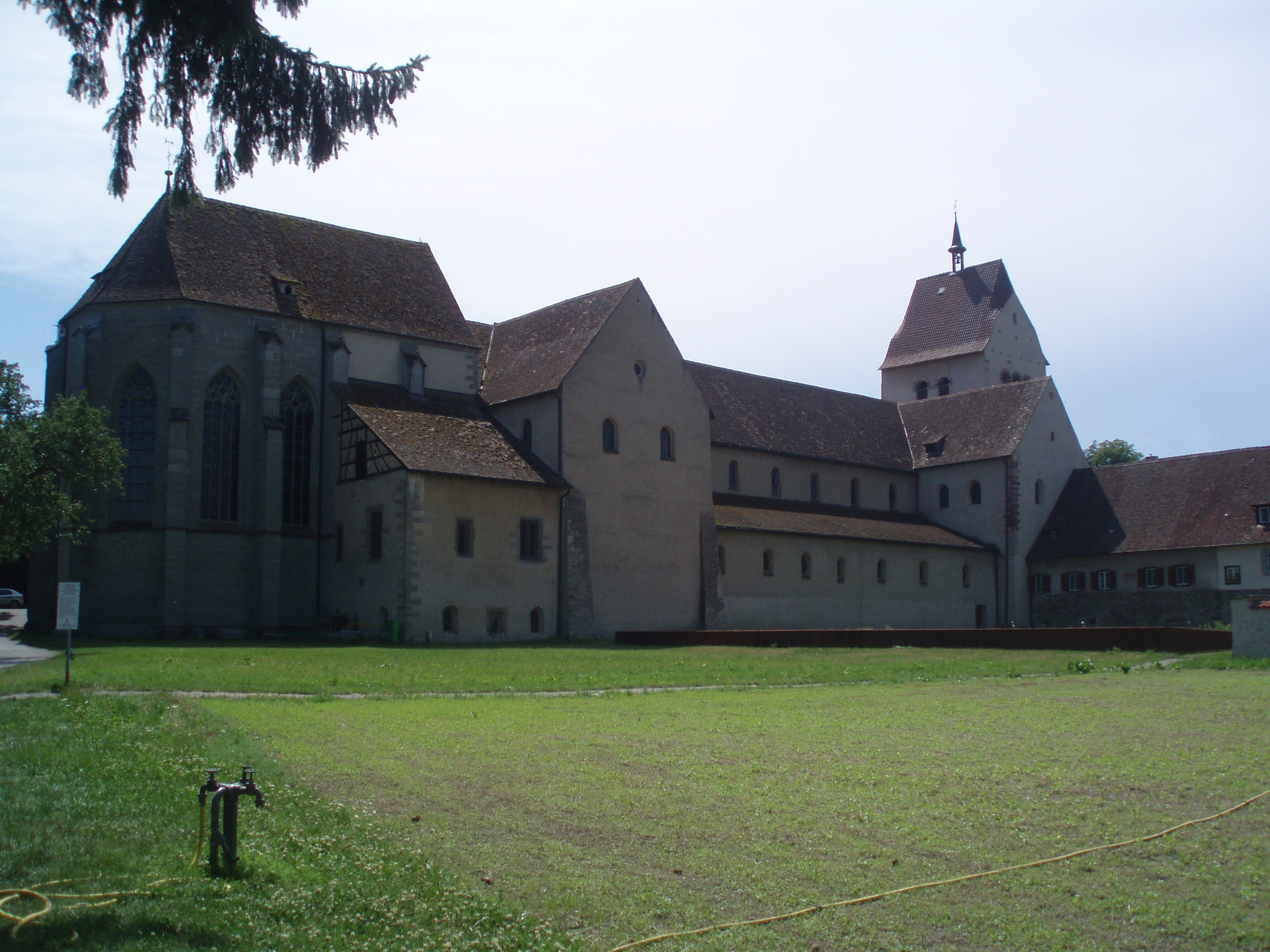
Reichenau monastery

Wetti of Reichenau (Latin: Wettinus Augiensis; c 775–824) was a Benedictine monk, scholar and educator at the monastery at Reichenau in modern-day Germany. He was one of the leading educators of his time, and an influential scholar among monks and laity throughout not only the Carolingian Empire but also the Western European monastic community. His best known surviving work is his biography of Saint Gallus, the founder of Reichenau's sister monastery, St Gall.

Wetti is best known for the visions of heaven and hell he had shortly before his death in about November 4, 824, which were recorded in Latin (Visio Wettini) by Heito, former abbot of Reichenau, in 824 and by Wetti's disciple Walahfrid Strabo in 827. Walahfrid's version, in verse, reveals far more about Wetti's visions than Heito's does, leveling more detailed accusations of greed and sexual misconduct against monks, government and church officials – cautiously edited or omitted by Heito – even acrostically naming Charlemagne when he appears in purgatory. An example of dream literature, the Vision of Wetti reflects Carolingian afterlife conceptions of punishment and salvation; it was widely read throughout contemporary monastic communities and is generally considered one of the influences on Dante's Divine Comedy.

== Early life and monastic career ==
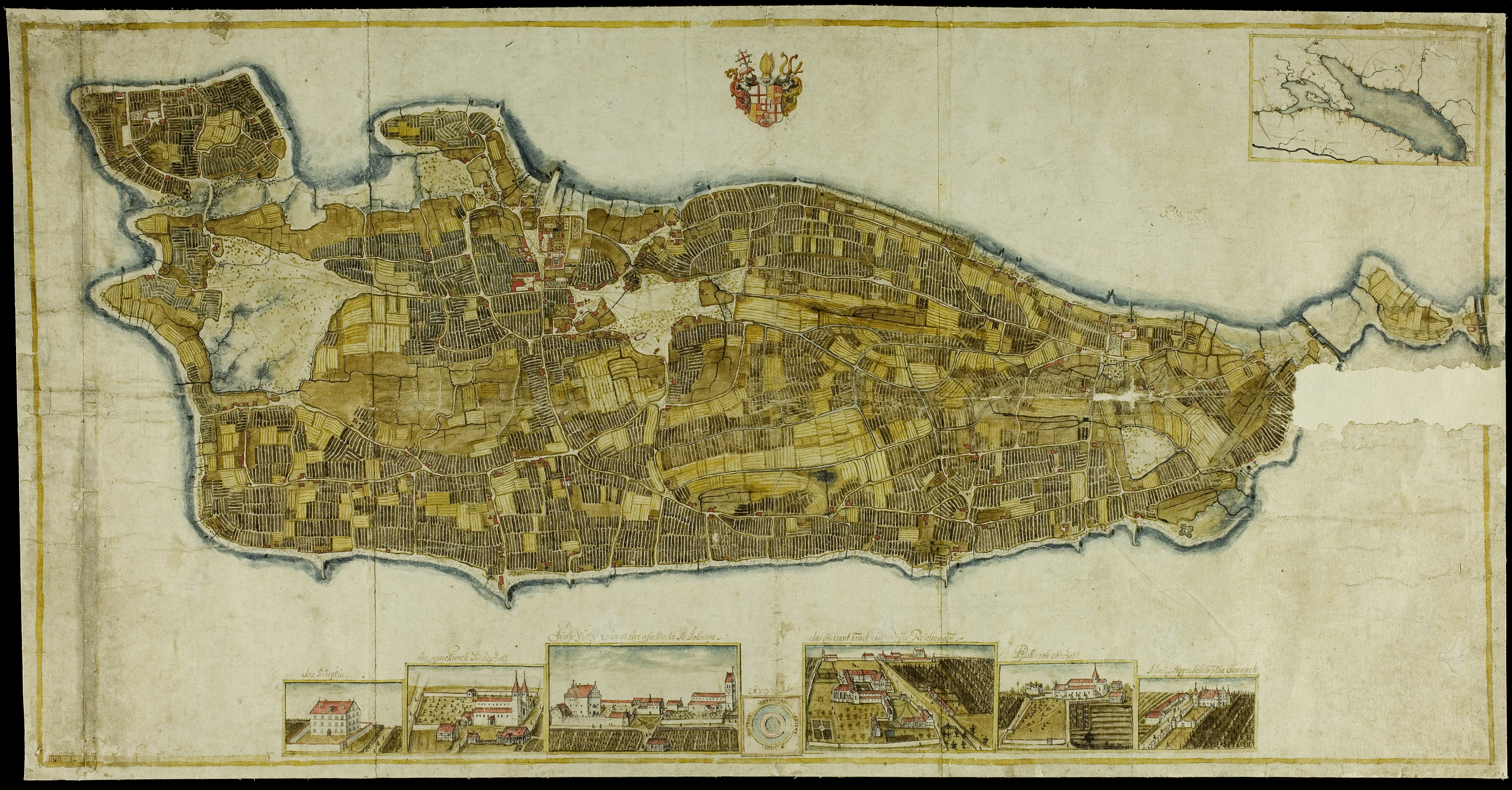
A 1707 map of the Island of Reichenau

Wetti was born in the 780s to a noble family. He was educated in both the classical tradition of the seven liberal arts and Irish monasticism at the Benedictine abbey of Reichenau, founded in 724 by the Irish monk Pirmin. He was apparently an "innocent boy" and a rebellious teenager before he settled down to teach at Reichenau's convent school.

Wetti officiated as master of the Reichenau monastery school for at least twenty years, training generations of monastic students; by all accounts, his students saw him as the ideal of monastic piety. Wetti's peers, furthermore, recognized him as Reichenau's "outstanding intellectual", which is "all the more impressive because [the eighth and ninth centuries were] Reichenau's golden age as a center of learning", a time in which Wetti, his reputation, authority, and opinions would have "had the power to lead (or mislead) not only his students but all of the monks."

Wetti also produced several written works, the best known of those that survive being his biography of Saint Gall, the founder of Reichenau's sister monastery, St Gall. Life of Saint Gall is divided into two books. The first book, dated to the early ninth century, briefly describes him as a studious, pious child, who in all likelihood "had been 'commended' to Columbanus at his parents' instigation" – commended in this sense denotes that Gall would have been entrusted to Columbanus, and does not suggest that he underwent the oblation rituals which became more common in the early ninth century. The second book is dated to the early 820s and was later redrafted by Walahfrid Strabo. It provides a more detailed account of the saint's work in establishing the monastery of St Gall, his later life, death, and the miracles around his grave until the end of the eighth century. While these biographies are the best known of Wetti's surviving work, he might have produced a larger body of work, although evidence to substantiate this is lacking.

== The Vision of Wetti ==
In late October 824 Wetti drank a potion – supposedly medicinal – and became violently ill, suffering "terrible pains, vomiting up undigested food, and balking at being fed ..." On the third day, still unwell, Wetti had his bed moved to a private chamber. Under vigil of some of his brothers, he soon drifted off and his first vision began. He dreamed that a demon dressed as a cleric entered the chamber, bringing torture instruments to punish him for his sins. Before it began to torment him a swarm of demons pushed their way into the room, but they were turned away by the monks and an angel peculiarly dressed in purple robes.

On awaking Wetti told his dream to the other monks and asked them to read aloud passages from Gregory's Dialogues regarding the afterlife, something which may have influenced the next vision. Shortly afterwards Wetti was again asleep. The same angel, this time in white, entered the room and led him through to purgatory, where Wetti was made to witness sinners suffering contrapasso punishments. He was first shown the fate of those guilty of sexual misconduct. He saw priests and their concubines bound to stakes, standing hip-deep in a river of fire, their genitals being flogged every third day.

Next he was made to observe the punishments for lay and ecclesiastical officials who lusted for wealth and prestige, officials who did not heed others' prayers, who neglected those in need, those who were indulgent, guilty of concealing wealth, adultery, concubinage and sodomy. Wetti was most terrified to see emperor Charlemagne, bound and completely unharmed, except for an animal tearing at his genitals. His shock came from the idea that Charlemagne was a pious, good-natured Christian king, but the angel revealed that all Charlemagne's good deeds had been negated by the lust and debauchery which dominated his later life. Yet he would eventually be forgiven because of his actions on behalf of Christianity.

Wetti is then led to heaven, where the angel asks a group of priests to petition Christ for Wetti's salvation. It is revealed that Wetti will die the following day and that he will ultimately be doomed to punishment because he had apparently become "smothered with laziness ... [and] shunned his duty" as a responsible educator, and had also perhaps corrupted his students in lurid ways. Christ tells Wetti that by doing so he had not only implicated himself but also misled and corrupted others – thus being responsible for their punishment.

Through a group of priests and virgins God informs Wetti that he could still be forgiven providing he corrects those he had led astray. Wetti is also enjoined to expose those guilty of adultery, sodomy, greed or neglect, to reform his own actions and to deliver a message of reform and austerity, such as drinking only water, wearing only functional clothing, pursuing humble study, holy poverty, and saintly self-sacrifice.

Although Wetti initially refuses this task, pleading his humility and unworthiness, on waking he immediately relays his dream to the monks. He also demands that his superiors Heito, Tatto, Theganmar and Erlebald be summoned, so that his vision could be recorded and remembered as a warning. After dictating his visions, which were recorded on wax tablets and later rewritten by Heito, Wetti spent his last day in prayer and study with Walahfrid Strabo. On November 4, 824 Wetti died, in much the same way as he described St Gall's death only a few years earlier – in prayer, surrounded by monks, friends and students.

=== Themes ===
Wetti's visions are inscribed in the genre of dream literature, which was largely practised during the 9th century. These accounts of alleged visions or dreams follow a typical structure in which visionaries, after falling asleep, are led by angelic guides through other worlds, where they are made to witness sinners' punishments. The similarity among these visions probably arises from common cultural experiences, such as Gregory the Great's teaching that afterlife visions were for the benefit of the living, who should work to redeem their sins and eradicate the social structures in which sin was able to proliferate. The Visio Wettini gained wide acclaim and served as a foundation of Dante's Divine Comedy.

Wetti's visions provide detailed descriptions of Frankish perceptions of the afterlife, its appearance, and the punishments reserved for sinners. Furthermore, what explicitly appears in Wetti's visions not only reveals a great deal about his perspectives on wealth, lust, gender relations and monastic responsibility, but also the degree to which these issues (excluding monasticism) pervaded all levels of lay and religious officialdom in 9th-century Carolingian France. Clearly, he saw these as something debasing and degrading Frankish society, however, it is also clear that because of his monastic training in humility, he felt all but unable to speak out against them.

There are differences between Heito's Visio Wettini and Walahfrid Strabo's 827 revision and transcription into verse. Whereas Heito deliberately dropped the names of the counts, priests and monks that the angel named as sinners, Walahfrid includes them, most importantly identifying Charlemagne as he suffers purgation. In so doing, Walahfrid obviously intended to answer Wetti's call which may otherwise have fallen on deaf ears, of identifying and condemning materialistic and sexual excesses in the Frankish political and religious hierarchies, something Heito, through omission and editing, was apparently unprepared to do. Beyond popularity, Walahfrid's poem helped to greatly advance his career, helping secure his place as tutor to Charles the Bald. Carol Zaleski explains that Walahfrid insisted that, "far from seeking advancement, he was 'forced to break [the silence] and impelled, as if by a goad, to keep on writing.'"

=== Manuscripts ===
Sixty copies of Heito's Visio Wettini survive today; the number suggests that the work was well received and comparatively more popular than Walahfrid's version, of which only seven copies survive. In the commentary to his 1974 English translation of Walahfrid's poem David Traill writes that the seven extant manuscripts are well preserved, with very few places in which reading becomes unclear. The relationship between these manuscripts, however, is uncertain, and has not yet been conclusively determined. In any case, none of them appear to be derived from any others, and generally fall into two main families: GD and ROM.

Ernst Dümmler's 1884 editions of Heito and Walahfrid's Visio Wettini have been digitally recorded, and are publicly accessible on the Monumenta Germaniae Historica website.

== Sources ==
=== Primary sources ===
- Dümmler, Ernest (ed). "Heitonis Visio Wettini". In Poetae Latini; Aevi Carolini, book 2. Frankfurt: Monumenta Germaniae Historica, 1884.
- Dümmler, Ernest (ed). "Visio Wettini Walahfridi". In Poetae Latini; Aevi Carolini, book 2. Frankfurt: Monumenta Germaniae Historica, 1884.
- Pollard, Richard (trans). Walahfrid Strabo. Visio Wettini.
- Pollard, Richard (trans). Heito. Visio Wettini.
- Traill, David. Walahfrid Strabo's Visio Wettini: Text, Translation and Commentary. Bern: Herbert Lang, 1974.

=== Bibliography ===
- Borst, Arno. Medieval Worlds: Barbarians, Heretics and Artists in the Middle Ages. Chicago: University of Chicago Press, 1996.
- De Jong, Mayke. "Commendatio and Oblatio" in In Samuel's Image: Child Oblation in the Early Medieval West. The Netherlands: EJ Brill, 1996.
- Diem, Albrecht. "Teaching Sodomy in a Carolingian Monastery" in German History, Volume 34, 2016. 385-401.
- Dutton, Paul. The Politics of Dreaming in the Carolingian Empire. Nebraska: University of Nebraska Press, 1994.
- Ganz, D.M. "Charlemagne in Hell". Florilegium, Volume 17, 2000. 175–194.
- Kay, Richard. "Charlemagne in Hell" in Kenneth Pennington and Melodie Harris Eichbauer (eds). Law as Profession and Practice in Medieval Europe: Essays in Honor of James A Brundage. Farnham: Ashgate Publishing Limited, 2011.
- Pollard, Richard. "Digital Devotion from Carolingian Reichenau and St. Gall". Digital Philology, Volume 1, No. 2, 2012. 292–302.
- Pollard, Richard. "Nonatola and Reichenau: A New Manuscript of Heito's Visio Wettini and the Foundations for a New Critical Addition". Revue Bénédictine, Vol. 120, No. 2, 2010. 243-294.
- Roper, Michelle L. "Uniting the Community of the Living with the Dead: The Use of Other-World Visions in the Early Middle Ages" in Mowbray, Donald; Purdie, Rhiannon and Wei, Ian (eds). Authority and Community in the Middle Ages. Stroud: Sutton Publishing Limited, 1999.
- Williams, Lorraine O'Donnel. "The Monastery Island of Reichenau". Catholic Insight, Vol. 21, No. 3. 14–16.
- Zaleski, Carol. Otherworld Journeys: Accounts of Near-Death Experience in Medieval and Modern Times. Oxford: Oxford University Press, 1987.
