= Johannes Fried =

German historian and medievalist (1942–2026)

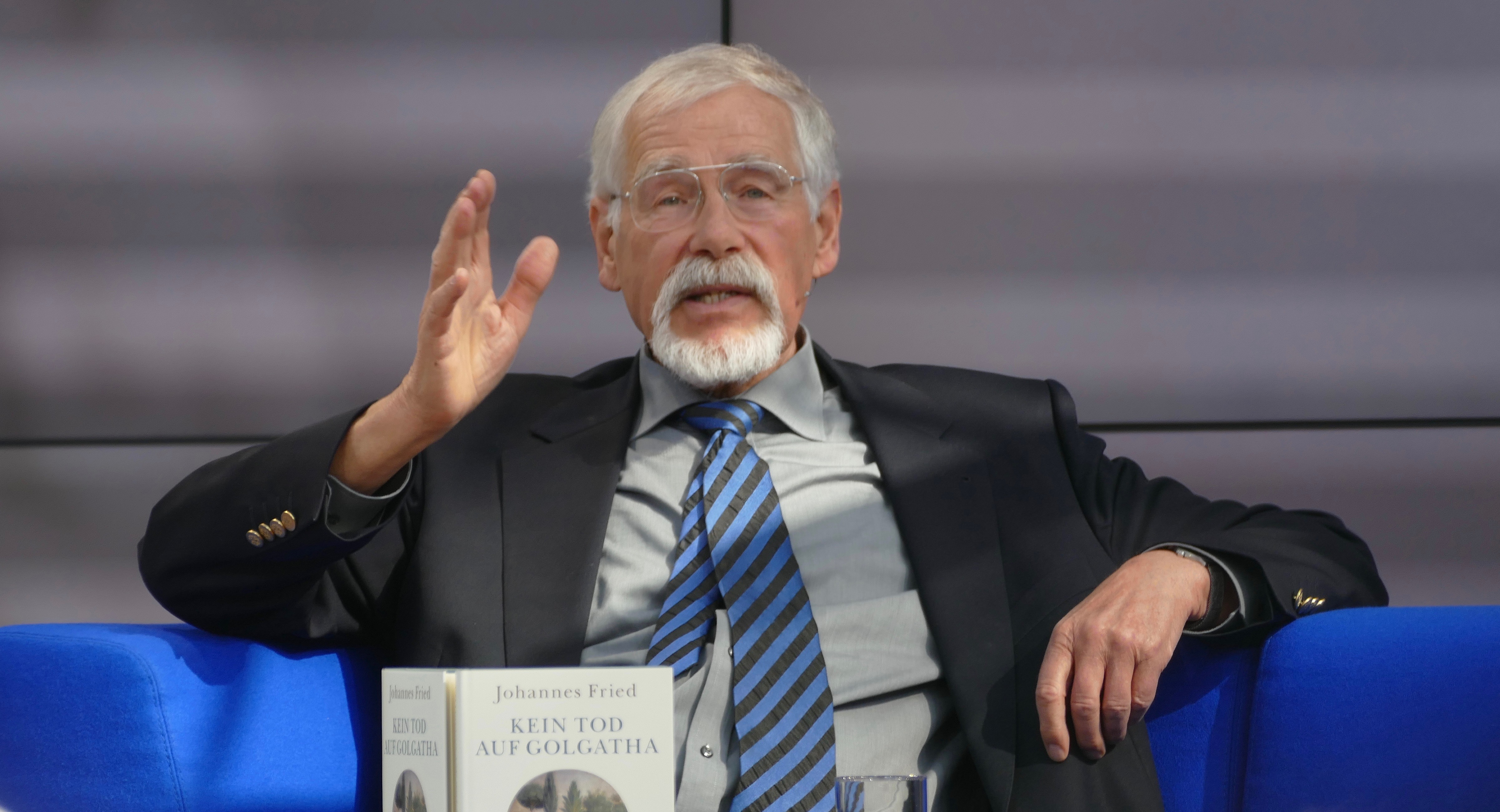
- Fried in 2019
- Born: 23 May 1942; Hamburg, Germany
- Died: 17 January 2026 (aged 83); Heidelberg, Baden-Württemberg, Germany
- Education: University of Heidelberg (PhD)
- Occupations: German historian and medievalist

Johannes Fried (23 May 1942 – 17 January 2026) was a German historian, academic and medievalist.

== Life and career ==
Fried was born on 23 May 1942. He studied at the University of Heidelberg, where he obtained his doctorate in 1970 and his habilitation in 1977. He was professor at the University of Cologne 1980–1983 and held the Chair of Medieval History at the University of Frankfurt am Main from 1983. He was a visiting Fellow at the Institute for Advanced Study in Princeton from 1995 to 1996.

He was a member of several learned societies and president of the Verband der Historiker und Historikerinnen Deutschlands (German Society of Historians) from 1996 to 2000.

Fried died in Heidelberg on 17 January 2026, at the age of 83.

== Theses ==
Johannes Fried considered Notger von Lüttich, not Johannes Canaparius, to be the author of Vita sancti Adalberti episcopi Pragensis on Adalbert of Prague (c. 956 – 997), written around 1000, which for the first time mentions Gdańsk (Danzig) as "urbs Gyddanyzc".

== Publications ==
(Only monographs are listed below)

- Die Entstehung des Juristenstandes im 12. Jahrhundert. Zur sozialen und politischen Bedeutung gelehrter Juristen in Bologna und Modena, Diss. phil. Heidelberg 1970 (research into newer private law history 21), Cologne, Vienna 1974.
- Der päpstliche Schutz für Laienfürsten. Die politische Geschichte des päpstlichen Schutzprivilegs für Laien (11.-13. Jahrhundert) (Heidelberg Academy's treatises on the sciences, Phil.-hist. Kl., Jg. 1980, Nr. 1), Heidelberg 1980.
- Otto III. und Boleslaw Chrobry. Das Widmungsbild des Aachener Evangeliars, der "Akt von Gnesen" und das frühe polnische und ungarische Königtum. Eine Bildanalyse und ihre historischen Folgen (Frankfurt Historical Treatises 30), Stuttgart 1989. (2nd revised edition published in Stuttgart 2001.)
- Die Formierung Europas 840–1046 (Oldenbourg Outline of History 6), Munich 1991, ²1993.
- Der Weg in die Geschichte. Die Ursprünge Deutschlands bis 1024 (Propylaea History of Germany 1), Berlin 1994.
- Kaiser Friedrich II. als Jäger oder ein zweites Falkenbuch Kaiser Friedrichs II. (News of the Academy, phil.-hist. Kl. 4), Göttingen 1996. Also appeared in: Esculum e Federico II. L'imperatore e la città: per una rilettura dei percorsi della memoria. Atti del Convegno di studio svoltosi in occasione della nona edizione del "Premio internazionale Ascoli Piceno", Ascoli Piceno, 14–16 December 1995, published by Enrico Menestò, Spoleto 1998, S. 33–86
- Aufstieg aus dem Untergang. Apokalyptisches Denken und die Entstehung der modernen Naturwissenschaft im Mittelalter, Munich 2001.
- Les fruits de l'Apocalypse. Origines de la pensée scientifique moderne au Moyen Âge. With a foreword by Jean-Claude Schmitt, translated by Denise Modigliani, Paris 2004.
- Die Aktualität des Mittelalters. Gegen die Überheblichkeit unserer Wissensgesellschaft, Sigmaringen 2003.
- Der Schleier der Erinnerung. Grundzüge einer historischen Memorik, Munich 2004.

Fried also published a large number of book chapters and articles in journals.
